= The Knights of the Fish =

Spanish fairy tale

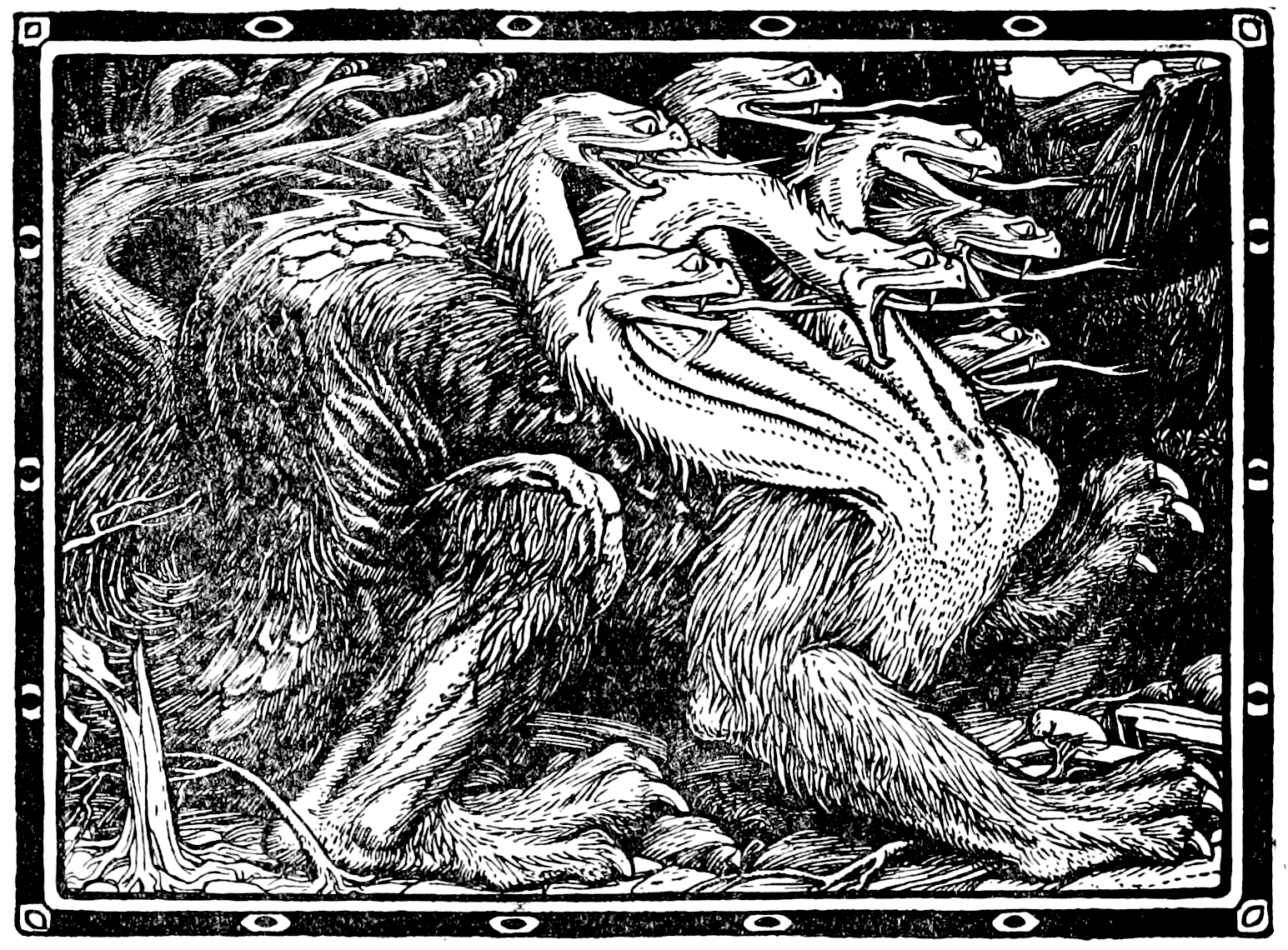
- The seven-headed dragon. Illustration from Europa's Fairy Book (1916).

Folk tale
- Name: The Knights of the Fish
- Also known as: Los Caballeros del Pez; The King of the Fishes (Joseph Jacobs)
- Aarne–Thompson grouping: ATU 303 (The Twins or Blood Brothers); ATU 300 (The Dragonslayer)
- Region: Spain, Eurasia, Worldwide
- Published in: Cuentos. Oraciones y Adivinanzas (1878), by Fernán Caballero; The Brown Fairy Book, by Andrew Lang; Europa's Fairy Book (1916), by Joseph Jacobs
- Related: The Twins (Albanian tale); Perseus and Andromeda; Princess and dragon

The Knights of the Fish (Spanish: "Los Caballeros del Pez") is a Spanish fairy tale collected by Fernán Caballero in Cuentos. Oraciones y Adivinas. Andrew Lang included it in The Brown Fairy Book. A translation was published in Golden Rod Fairy Book. Another version of the tale appears in A Book of Enchantments and Curses by Ruth Manning-Sanders.

It is classified in the Aarne–Thompson–Uther Index as type 303 ("The Twins or Blood Brothers"). Most tales of the sort begin with the father catching a talking fish thrice and, in the third time, the animal asks to be sacrificed and fed to the fisherman's wife and horses, and for his remains to be buried underneath a tree. By doing so, twins are born to him and his wife, as well as two foals and two trees. It is also classified as ATU 300 ("The Dragon-Slayer"), a widespread tale.

== Synopsis ==
An industrious but poor cobbler tried to fish until he was so hungry that he thought he would hang himself if he caught nothing. He caught a beautiful fish. It told him to cook it and then give two pieces to his wife, and bury two more in the garden. He did this. His wife gave birth to twin boys, and two plants sprang up, bearing shields, in the garden.

When the boys were grown, they decided to travel. At a crossroad, they parted ways. One found a city grieving, because every year a maiden had to be offered up to a dragon, and this year the lot had fallen on the princess. He went to see where the princess was, and then left her to fetch a mirror. He told her to cover it with her veil and hide behind it; when the dragon approached, she was to tear the veil off. She did, and the dragon stared at his rival, identical to him. He threatened it until he finally smashed it to pieces, but as every fragment reflected him, he thought he too had been smashed. While the dragon was still baffled, the knight killed it. The king married him to his daughter.

The princess then showed him all over the country. He saw a castle of black marble, and was warned that whoever went to it never returned. He set out the next day. When he blew his horn and struck the gate, a woman finally opened the door. Echoes warned him off. He lifted his helmet, and the woman, who was an evil witch, let him in because he was so handsome. She told him that she would marry him, but he refused. The witch showed him over the castle and suddenly killed him by dropping him through a trapdoor.

His brother came to the city, and was taken for him. He kept quiet, so he could help his brother, and told the princess that he had to go back to the castle. He demanded to know what happened to his brother, and the echoes told him the truth. With this knowledge, as soon as he met the witch, he stabbed her with his sword. The dying witch then beg him to save her life with magical plants from the garden. He found the bodies of his brother and the witch's previous victims, and restored them to life using the magic plants. He also found a cave full of maidens who had been killed by the dragon, reviving them too. After they all left, the witch died and her castle collapsed.

== Motifs ==
The motif of the demand for sacrifice of youngsters of either sex happens in the Greek myth of Theseus and the Minotaur. However, a specific variant, where the dragon or serpent demands the sacrifice of young maidens or princesses is shared by many tales or legends all over the world: Japanese tale of Susanoo-no-Mikoto and the eight-headed serpent Orochi; Chinese folktale of Li Ji Slays the Great Serpent, attested in Soushen Ji, a 4th-century compilation of stories by Gan Bao.

The myth of Perseus and Andromeda is an archaic reflex of the princess and dragon theme: for disrespecting the Nereids, sea god Poseidon demands in sacrifice the life of the Ethiopian princess Andromeda to the sea monster Cetus. She is thus chained to a rock afloat in the sea, but is rescued by semi-divine hero Perseus. A similar event happens in the story of Trojan princess Hesione.

The many-headed serpent enemy shares similarities with Greek mythic creature Hydra, defeated by Heracles as part of his Twelve Labors. An episode of a battle with the dragon also occurs in several fairy tales: The Three Dogs, The Two Brothers, The Merchant (fairy tale), The Bold Knight, the Apples of Youth, and the Water of Life, The Three Princes and their Beasts, The Thirteenth Son of the King of Erin, Georgic and Merlin, the epic feats of Dobrynya Nikitich, the Polish legend of the Wawel Dragon.

The motif of the birth of twin boys by eating a magical fish shares similarities with a practice involving flower petals, as seen in the ATU 711, "The Beautiful and the Ugly Twin" (Tatterhood).

== Variants ==
=== Origins ===
Greek folklorist Georgios A. Megas listed several conflicting theories that different scholars have proposed for the origins of the tale type (ATU 303): some see a possible connection with the Ancient Egyptian story Tale of Two Brothers; Waldemar Liungman suggested a origin in the Byzantine period (300-1500 CE); Wolfgang Hierse indicated the Eastern Mediterranean, during the Hellenistic period.

According to scholar Christine Goldberg, studies on both tale types ATU 300 and ATU 303 using the historic-geographic method concluded that type 300 has "old elements", but the "modern form" originated in medieval times, while type 303 is more recent because it included type 300 within its narrative. Kurt Ranke, for example, supposed that type 303 originated in Western Europe, in France, during medieval times.

In Kurt Ranke's 1934 analysis, he noted that type 300 is "often" inserted into the narrative of type 303, "The Twin Brothers". In addition, he noticed that, despite the variability in the structure of tale type 300, its "essential components" were the three magic attacking dogs, the fight with the monster and the false hero that claims the credit for the deed and is punished.

=== Distribution ===
German scholar Kurt Ranke, who authored one of the definitive studies on the tale type ATU 303, analysed some 770 variants. As researcher Richard M. Dorson put it, the tale type "is well distributed throughout Europe and densely reported from Finland, Ireland, Germany, France, and Hungary.".

Variants are also found in Africa, such as The Twin Brothers from French Congo; Rombao, from Quelimane; The Twins, from the Yoruba people; The Queen of the Fish, from Réunion, in the Indic Ocean, Los hermanos gemelos, la serpiente y el antílope maldito, from the Djerma-Songay, and Grand-Kibaraka et Petit-Kibaraka (Malagasy: Kibarakabe noho Kibarakakely), from the Vezo people. Similar tales are also reported among indigenous peoples of the Americas, such as The Eight-Headed Windigo, from a Chippewan teller.

On a more global scale, Daniel J. Crowley, comparing tale indexes of Indonesia, Africa, Madagascar, British Islands, France, Spain and the Muslim Near East, concluded that the tale type appears "among the most popular and widespread tales on earth".

=== The birth of the twins (triplets) ===
According to Kurt Ranke, in Enzyklopädie des Märchens, the "constitutive" element of tale type ATU 303 is the twins' birth either by their mother drinking magic water or eating a wonderful fish or apple.

==== Ingestion of fish or aquatic animal ====
The usual tale involves the birth of twins from the ingestion of the flesh of the fish - a motif that opens the tale type and, according to scholar Patrice Lajoye, with considerable antiquity. French historian François Delpech (fr) noted that the twins or triplets born of the fish show celestial birthmarks on the head - a similar appearance shared by the foals and hounds that are also born through the fish. From the remains of the fish a pair of swords and a bush sprout (which serve as their token of life). The opening appears in French, Hispanic and Portuguese texts.

Very rarely, there are born triplets, such as in a variant from Brittany, France, collected by folklorist Adolphe Orain: in Les chevaliers de la belle étoile, instead of the usual twins, three sons are born when their mother is given the flesh of the enchanted eel (which replaces the fish). Each of the brothers is born with a star on the forehead. Similar variants include Le rei des peiches, from Bélesta, Ariège, wherein triplets are born from the magical fish; and Polish "О рыбаке и трех его сыновьях" (English: "About the Fisherman and his Three Sons"), where the fisherman catches, as third try, a fish with diamond scales and gills that engenders the human triplets.

In Czech fairy tale The Twin Brothers, the enchanted fish is described as a princess cursed into piscian form. When a woman catches her (as fish) to eat, the princess says she will be delivered from her curse "as soon as [her] body has rotted".

The fish is also replaced by three eels in Serbian fairy tale "Три јегуље" ("The Three Eels"), by Vuk Karadzic.

In a Valencian tale collected by Enric Valor i Vives, La Mare dels Peixos ("The Mother of Fishes"), when the fisherman is sailing in the sea, he captures an eel-like, aquatic being with three heads that introduces itself at the "Mother of the Fishes". She tells the fisherman to kill it, and to give one of its heads to his wife, his dogs and his horses.

In an Asturian tale collected by Aurelio de Llano Roza de Ampudia, El pescador y la serena ("The Fisherman and the Mermaid"), the titular fisherman captures a mermaid who tells him to cut her apart in eight parts and give two to his wife. Thus, she will bear twins.

==== Ingestion of fruit ====
The aquatic animal is replaced altogether for a fruit in other variants, such as an apple in Europe (for example, in the Slavonic tale The Brothers); a pomegranate or apple (in Iran); or a mango, which appears in the Indic form of the tale type (according to researcher Mary Brockington).

According to Armenian scholarship, the motif of the apple also appears in Armenian variants: a passing dervish gives the apple to the king's wife so that she may bear twins, but the dervish asks for one of the twins in payment. One of the boys is given to the dervish. After some time, he dips his hair in a magic golden pool, escapes from him with a horse and wears a disguise to work as a king's gardener (tale type ATU 314, "The Goldener", wherein a youth gains golden hair by magic and later works in a menial position). After the boy is petrified by a witch, his twin comes to his rescue (type ATU 303).

In a tale from Dagestan translated into Hungarian with the title Aranyhajú Arszlan ("Golden-Haired Arszlan"), a childless man is given a pair of beans as remedy for his plight by an old hermit, who asks for one of the twins in return. The beans work, and a pair of twins is born, named Arszlan and Batir. Arszlan is given to the hermit, who is in reality an evil creature. The youth escapes with a horse, dips his body in a river of a golden colour and works as gardener in another kingdom (tale type ATU 314).

In an Iranian tale collected by Emily Lorimer and David Lockhart Robertson Lorimer from Bakhtiari with the title The Gazelle Maiden and the Golden Brothers, a childless king with seven wives, named Malik Ahmad, receives a pomegranate from a dervish to give to his wife. She bears twins, and the elder twin, called Malik Mahmad, opts to accompany the dervish as part of his father's deal. On the way to a golden fountain, an old greybeard warns the youth that the dervish will kill him, so he should escape from him with his horse. He follows the man's instructions, bathes in the golden fountain and kills the dervish. He finds work in another kingdom, marries a girl and follows a gazelle to a cave. He enters the cave and sees a beautiful maiden, who reveals she is the gazelle. She challenges the golden twin to a physical battle. He loses and is put away with other prisoners. Far away, his younger twin, Sultan Mahmad, sees the brother's ring turn black and senses his twin is in danger. Sultan Mahmad meets his sister-in-law and puts a sword between them in bed. Later, Sultan Mahmad defeats the strong lady, marries her and releases his twin brother and the prisoners.

==== Imbibing of water ====
In an Afro-American variant from Antigua, Black Jack and White Jack, a White lady and a Black lady move to a strange land and walk about with a bottle of water. During three walks, as soon as their bottles are empty, they return home. On the fourth time, they see two ponds, one white and the other black. The White lady drinks from the white pond and gives birth to a White boy, and the Black lady from the black pond, and gives birth to a Black boy.

==== Birth of lookalike individuals ====
The ATU 303 type usually involves the birth of twins (or triplets), but in variants there are born two similar-looking individuals from a rich mother (queen, lady) and a poor one (maid, servant), who both ate the magical item that, according to some in-story superstition, is said to have pregnancy-inducing properties, such as a fruit or herb. Despite their different origins, both youths hold great affection and loyalty towards each other. One example is the Swedish folktale Silfver-hvit och Lill-vacker (English: "Silverwhite and Lillwacker").

In a Romanian fairy tale, Der Morgenstern und der Abendstern ("The Morning-Star and the Evening-Star"), a king and a queen have tried to conceive a child, but no such luck. One night, the empress dreams that God told her the method: the king must catch a fish, cook it and give it to the queen, who gives birth to a boy. A maid also tastes the queen's plate and gives birth to another boy. The prince is named Busujok and the maid's son Siminok.

In the Moravian tale Zkamenělí lidé ("The Petrified People"), a princess and her friend, a burgermeister's daughter, drink seawater and become pregnant at the same time. Seven years later, the king suspects foul play and plans execution of the maidens and their incredibly similar children, Petr and Karl. The king prepares a trial by ordeal: both boys should walk on water. Both pass the trial, since they did not sink in the sea.

In a Russian fairy tale, when the fisherman gives the fish for his wife to eat, she shares the food with the mare and the cow. Later, three individuals are born: three half-brothers, one of the human woman, the second of the mare and the third, Cow's Son, of the cow. The cow's son is the strongest and the hero of the tale.

In an Irish tale published by poet W. B. Yeats from an "old man" in Galway, Jack and Bill, the king's wife and a female cook eat a fish and give birth to identical individuals. They become very close friends, but depart to have their own adventures. Jack kills dragons and rescues a princess. He is later killed by a witch in the woods, but Bill saves him soon after. This tale was also published in Yeats's The Celtic Twilight with the name Dreams that have no Moral and in Lady Gregory's The Kiltartan Wonder Book, wherein the heroes are named Seamus and Shawneen.

In a Swiss tale collected by author Dietrich Jecklin from Schlans with the title Von den zwei Freunden ("About the two friends"), intent on never marrying his daughters, a king isolates them in a palace he built for them on a remote island. However, a mysterious male figure emerges from the sea and spends the night at the castle. Nine months later, a boy is born to each princess, each boy looking exactly like the other.

=== The names of the heroes ===
If the characters are named in the tale, both brothers may have water-related names, a motif that appears in Sweden, Germany (western and northwestern), Bohemia, Hungary, Denmark, Finland, Baltic Countries and Russia. According to Swedish scholar Waldemar Liungman, the heroes' water-related names are a "reminiscence" of their origin either through the fish or by water.

For instance, in Swedish variant Wattuman und Wattusin (Wassermann und Wasserjunge), in the Brothers Grimm tale Johann Wassersprung und Kaspar Wassersprung ("Johannes Waterspring and Casper Waterspring"), in another German variant Wasserpaul and Wasserpeter, or in a Hungarian variant Vízi Péter és Vízi Pál (vízi means "water" in Hungarian).

In another German variant, The Two Foundlings of the Spring, or, The Story of Brunnenhold and Brunnenstark, an exiled princess finds two babies near a spring and decided that "they shall both take their names from the water": Brunnenhold, with "blue eyes and hair", and Brunnenstark, because he is stronger than his brother. The tale of brothers Brunnenhold and Brunnenstark was also given a somewhat abridged format by 19th century theologian Johann Andreas Christian Löhr, with the name Die Söhne der Quelle.

In a Russian-language Siberian variant titled "Федор Водович и Иван Водович" ("Fyodor Vodovich and Ivan Vodovich", or "Fyodor, Son of the Water, and Ivan, Son of the Water"), a queen gives birth to a daughter, much to her husband's chagrin. The king decides to lock his daughter up in a dungeon with a companion, to protect her from the world. One day, when she is finally allowed to leave the dungeon as a young woman, she drinks a bit of water from a well. Nine months later, she gives birth to two boys, later baptized as Ivan Vodovich and Fyodor Vodovich (vodo/a means water in Russian).

In an Irish tale from County Cork titled Tom Fisher and John Fisher, a fisherman's daughter catches a big fish into her boat. The fish becomes a man and marries her. They have twin boys, one named Tom Fisher and the other John Fisher. In this regard, Irish folklorist Dáithí Ó hÓgáin stated that the heroes of type 303 in Ireland are known as "É the Salmon's Son" and "Ó the Salmon's Son", because their father, a fisherman, catches a salmon as the birth implement for his wife.

=== The adventures of the twins (triplets) ===
The general narrative of the tale type separates the twins: one defeats the dragon and, after he marries the princess, goes to an illuminated castle (or tower) in the distance, where a witch resides. In Iberian variants, this castle is known as "Castle of No Return" (Spanish: Castillo de Irás y No Volverás) or "Tower of the Ill-Hour" (Portuguese: Torre da Má Hora). Later, his twin (or younger triplet) defeats the witch and rescues the older brother. Before the younger brother goes to rescue his sibling, he meets his sister-in-law, who mistakes him for her husband. To avoid any future complications, the brother lays down a sword between them in the royal bed. This motif is known as "The Sword of Chastity" and scholarship argues that it is "an integral part" of this tale type.

Some versions preserve the motif of the helping animals, attested in the pure form of ATU 300, "The Dragonslayer", where the sole hero is helped by four different animals or by three powerful dogs. One example of the latter type is the Romanian variant Măr și Păr: the prince Măr names his dogs "Florian, Cioban and Frunză de megheran", and the servant's son Păr gives his hounds the names of "Bujor, Rozor and Cetina brazilor".

The dragon of the tale, in Scandinavian variants, is sometimes replaced by a troll that lives in the sea.

In a tale collected from Wallonia, Le Garçon avec Ses Trois Chiens, triplets are born from the ingestion of the fish's flesh. This variant is peculiar in that it inverts the usual narrative: the brothers' petrification by the witch occurs before the episode of the dragon-slaying. The youngest triplet rescues his older brothers and later the princess demanded by the dragon.

A similar inversion of the twins' adventures occurs in Cossack (Ukrainian) tale The Two Princes: the younger twin rescues his older brother from the pagan witch that petrified him and his dog, and later the dragon-slaying episode happens.

In another tale, Die zwei Brüder ("The Two Brothers"), the heroes are born after the ingestion of the fish, one stays home and the other goes around the world. In this story, the episode of the petrification in the castle of the witch happens after the killing of the dragon, but before the revelation of the false hero.

In an unsourced tale published by Andrew Lang in his The Grey Fairy Book, The Twin Brothers, an old woman reveals that the infertility of a fisherman's wife can be cured by ingesting the flesh of a gold-fish, and after some should be given to her she-dogs and mares. Male twins are born, two foals and two puppies - each brother getting a hound and a horse. When the older twin leaves home, he arrives in a kingdom and tries to woo the princess Fairest in the Land, by performing her father's three tasks. Later, he arrives in another kingdom, where a giant has blocked the flow of waters and only releases it once a year when he is given a maiden to devour. A similar version was collected by scholar Giorgos A. Megas in his book Folktales of Greece. This tale was originally collected in German by Austrian consul Johann Georg von Hahn from Negades, with the title Die Zwillingsbrüder.

Some variants skip the birth implement altogether and begin with the twin (triplet) princes going their separates ways at the crossroads, after they gather their animal retinues.

== Adaptations ==
The tale type was adapted into the story Los hermanos gemelos ("The Twin Brothers"), by Spanish writer Romualdo Nogués, with a moral at the end. A second adaptation was published in Spanish newspaper El Imparcial, in 1923, titled El pez y los tres rosales ("The Fish and the Three Rosebushes").

A Hungarian variant of the tale was adapted into an episode of the Hungarian television series Magyar népmesék ("Hungarian Folk Tales") (hu), with the title A kõvé vált királyfi ("The Prince who turned into Stone"). This version replaces the sacrifice of a maiden to a dragon for a fight against an invincible warrior of the enemy army.

British author Alan Garner adapted a British variant as The Golden Brothers: a poor fisherman catches a magical golden fish that grants him a castle, as long as he does not tell anyone. He eventually tells his wife of his success and the spell is broken. On orders of his wife, he catches the golden fish again. This time, the fish tells the man to cut it up in six pieces, then give two to his wife, two to his mare and bury the last two. Two golden twins are born to them, as well as two golden foals and two golden lilies. One boy rides forth and marries a girl from a village, and another stays at home, until he has to rescue his twin from a witch's petrification spell.

== See also ==
- The Two Brothers (Grimm fairy tale)
- The Gold-Children (Grimm fairy tale)
- The Merchant (fairy tale)
- The Enchanted Doe
- The Twins (Albanian tale)
- The Three Dogs
- The Sea-Maiden
- The Seven-headed Serpent
- Princess and dragon and other tales of dragon- or serpent-slaying by a hero (ATU Index type 300, "The Dragonslayer")
- Dragonslayer (a heroic archetype in fiction, fantasy and mythology)
- Minotaur
- Aloadae (Greek pair of Giant twins)
- Tsovinar (goddess)

== Bibliography ==
- Amores, Monstserrat. Catalogo de cuentos folcloricos reelaborados por escritores del siglo XIX. Madrid: CONSEJO SUPERIOR DE INVESTIGACIONES CIENTÍFICAS, DEPARTAMENTO DE ANTROPOLOGÍA DE ESPAÑA Y AMÉRICA. 1997. pp. 69–71. ISBN 84-00-07678-8
- Boggs, Ralph Steele. Index of Spanish folktales, classified according to Antti Aarne's "Types of the folktale". Chicago: University of Chicago. 1930. pp. 40–41.
