= Princess and dragon =

Archetype common to legends and folktales

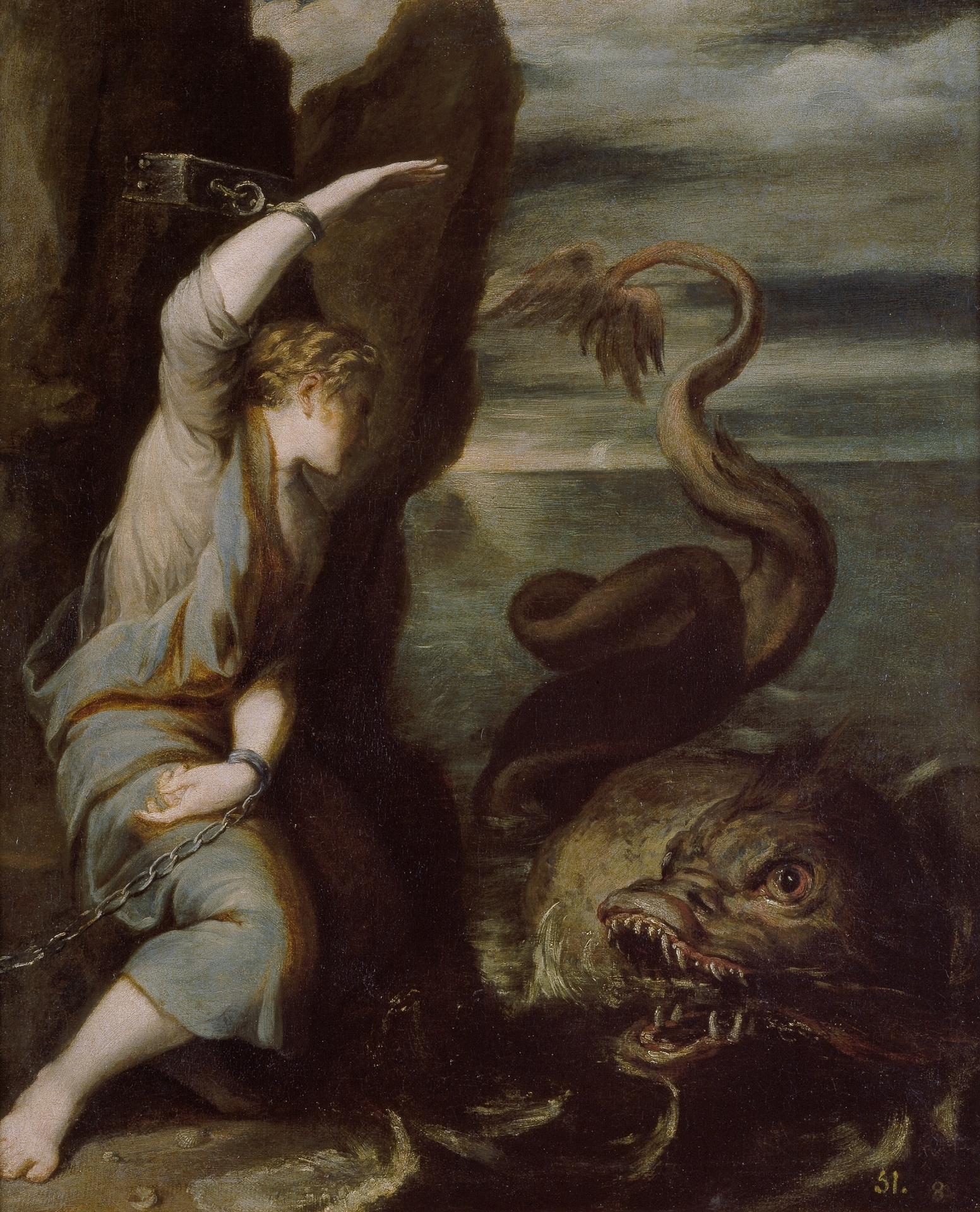
Andrómeda by Juan Antonio de Frías y Escalante (1633–1670), depicting Princess Andromeda of Greek mythology chained to a rock as a sacrifice to the dragon-like sea monster Cetus.

Princess and dragon is an archetypical premise common to many legends, fairy tales, and chivalric romances. Northrop Frye identified it as a central form of the quest romance.

The story involves an upper-class woman, generally a princess or similar high-ranking nobility, saved from a dragon, either a literal dragon or a similar danger, by the virtuous hero (see damsel in distress). She may be the first woman endangered by the peril, or may be the end of a long succession of women who were not of as high birth as she is, nor as fortunate. Normally the princess ends up married to the dragonslayer.

The motifs of the hero who finds the princess about to be sacrificed to the dragon and saves her, the false hero who takes his place, and the final revelation of the true hero, are the identifying marks of the Aarne–Thompson folktale type 300, the Dragon-Slayer. They also appear in type 303, the Two Brothers. These two tales have been found, in different variants, in countries all over the world.

The "princess and dragon" scenario is given even more weight in popular imagination than it is in the original tales; the stereotypical hero is envisioned as slaying dragons even though, for instance, the Brothers Grimm had only a few tales of dragon and giant slayers among hundreds of tales.

== History ==
One of the earliest examples of the motif comes from the Ancient Greek tale of Perseus, who rescued the princess Andromeda from Cetus, a sea monster often described as resembling a serpent or dragon. This was taken up into other Greek myths, such as Heracles, who rescued the princess Hesione of Troy from a similar sea monster. Most ancient versions depicted the dragon as the expression of a god's wrath: in Andromeda's case, because her mother Queen Cassiopeia had compared her beauty to that of the sea nymphs, and in Hesione's, because her father had reneged on a bargain with Poseidon. This is less common in fairy tales and other, later versions, where the dragon is frequently acting out of malice. The homosexual variety of the tale is also found in Greek mythology; similar myths existed in Crissa and Thespiae of a terrifying beast that ravaged the place unless a young man was sacrificed—Alcyoneus in Crisa and Cleostratus in Thespiae—to them. In both cases a man who is in love with the youth (Eurybarus and Menestratus respectively) steps in to take his place and slay the monster.

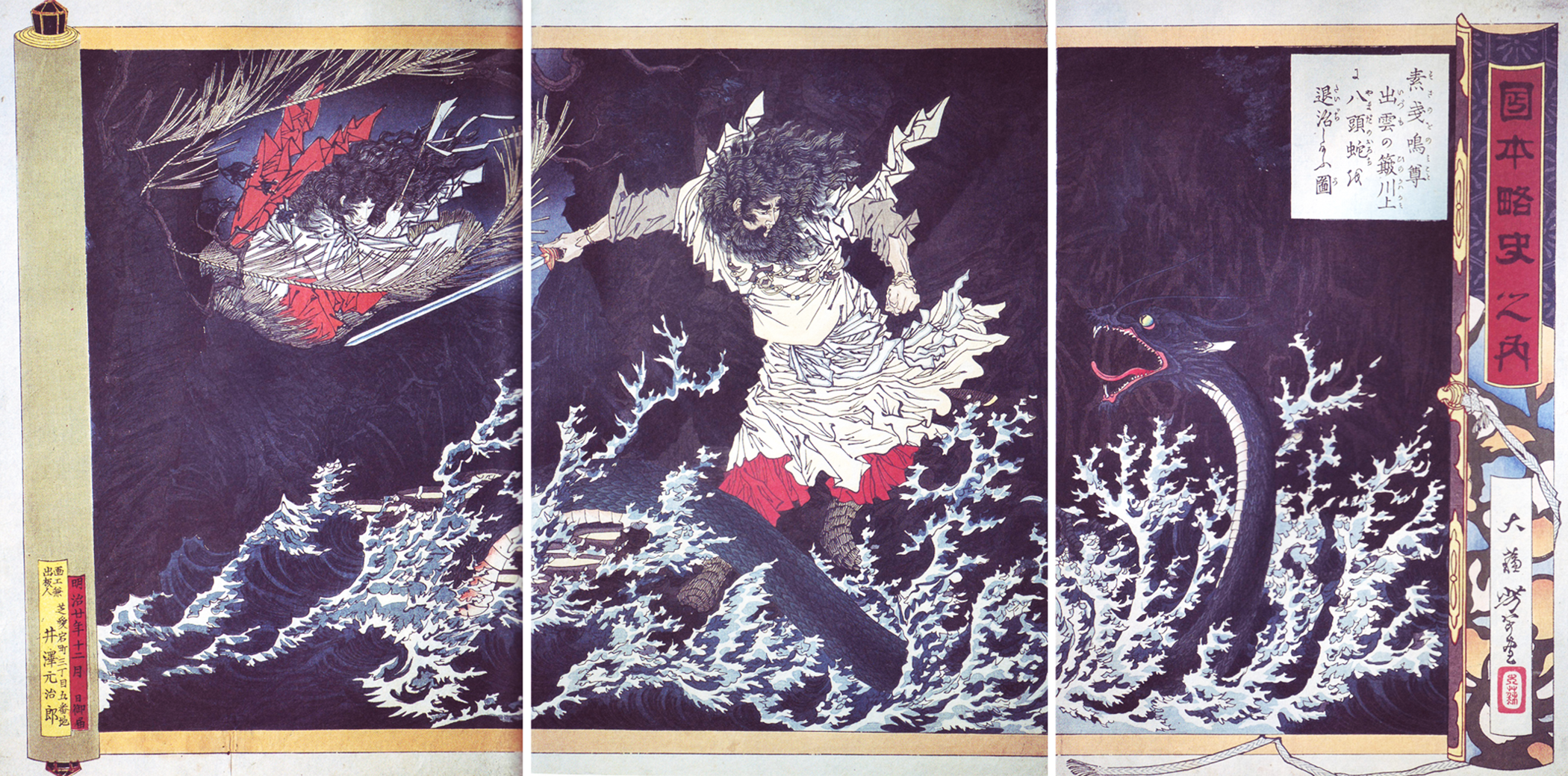
Susanoo slaying the Yamata no Orochi, by Yoshitoshi.

The Japanese legend of Yamata no Orochi also invokes this motif. The god Susanoo encounters two "Earthly Deities" who have been forced to sacrifice their seven daughters to a many-headed monster, and their daughter Kushinadahime is the next victim. Susanoo is able to kill the dragon after getting it drunk on sake (rice wine).

Another variation is from the tale of Saint George and the Dragon. The tale begins with a dragon making its nest at the spring which provides a city-state with water. Consequently, the citizens had to temporarily remove the dragon from its nest in order to collect water. To do so, they offered the dragon a daily human sacrifice. The victim of the day was chosen by drawing lots. Eventually in this lottery, the lot happened to fall to the local princess. The local monarch is occasionally depicted begging for her life with no result. She is offered to the dragon but at this point a traveling Saint George arrives. He faces and defeats the dragon and saves the princess; some versions claim that the dragon is not killed in the fight, but pacified once George ties the princess's sash around its neck. The grateful citizens then abandon their ancestral paganism and convert to Christianity.

A similar tale to St. George's, attributed to Russian sources, is that of St. Yegóry, the Brave: after the kingdoms of Sodom and Komor fall, the kingdom of "Arabia" is menaced by a sea-monster that demands a sacrifice of a human victim every day. The queenly stepmother sent Princess Elizabeth, the Fair, as the sacrifice. Yegóry, the Brave rescues Elizabeth and uses her sash to bind the beast. To mark her deliverance, he demands the building of three churches.

In a tale from Tibet, a kingdom suffers from drought due to two "serpent-gods" blocking the streams of water at the source. Both dragons also demand the sacrifices of citizens from the kingdom, men and women, to appease them, until prince Schalu and his faithful companion Saran decide to put an end to their existence.

When the tale is not about a dragon but a troll, giant, or ogre, the princess is often a captive rather than about to be eaten, as in The Three Princesses of Whiteland. These princesses are often a vital source of information to their rescuers, telling them how to perform tasks that the captor sets to them, or how to kill the monster, and when she does not know, as in The Giant Who Had No Heart in His Body, she frequently can pry the information from the giant. Despite the hero's helplessness without this information, the princess is incapable of using the knowledge herself.

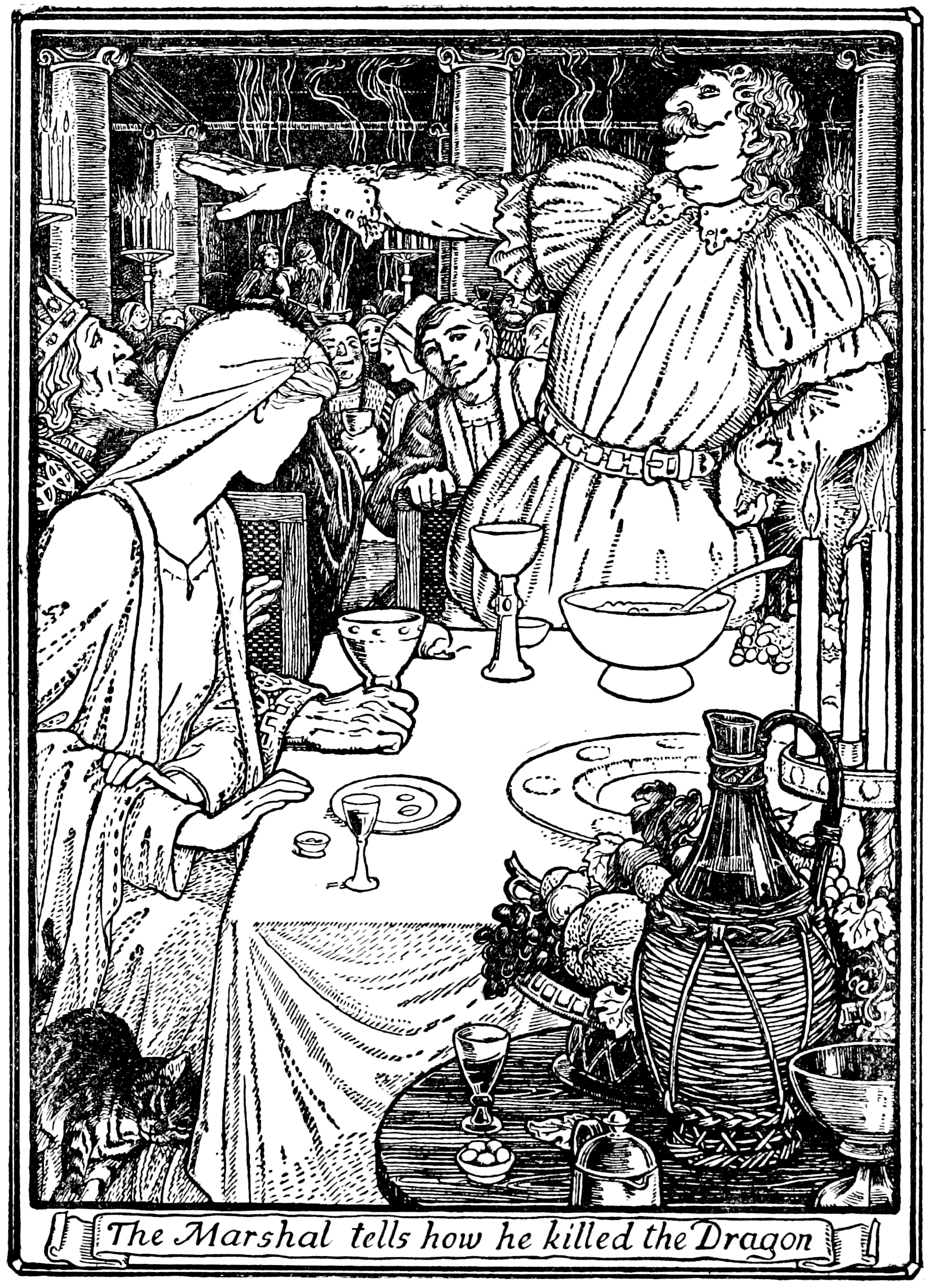
The Marshall (false hero) tells the court how he killed the dragon. Illustration by John Batten for Joseph Jacobs's Europa's Fairy Book (1916).

Again, if a false claimant intimidates her into silence about who actually killed the monster as in the fairy tale The Two Brothers, when the hero appears, she will endorse his story, but she will not tell the truth prior to them; she often agrees to marry the false claimant in the hero's absence. The hero has often cut out the tongue of the dragon, so when the false hero cuts off its head, his claim to have killed it is refuted by its lack of a tongue; the hero produces the tongue and so proves his claim to marry the princess. In some tales, however, the princess herself takes steps to ensure that she can identify the hero—cutting off a piece of his cloak as in Georgic and Merlin, giving him tokens as in The Sea-Maiden—and so separate him from the false hero.

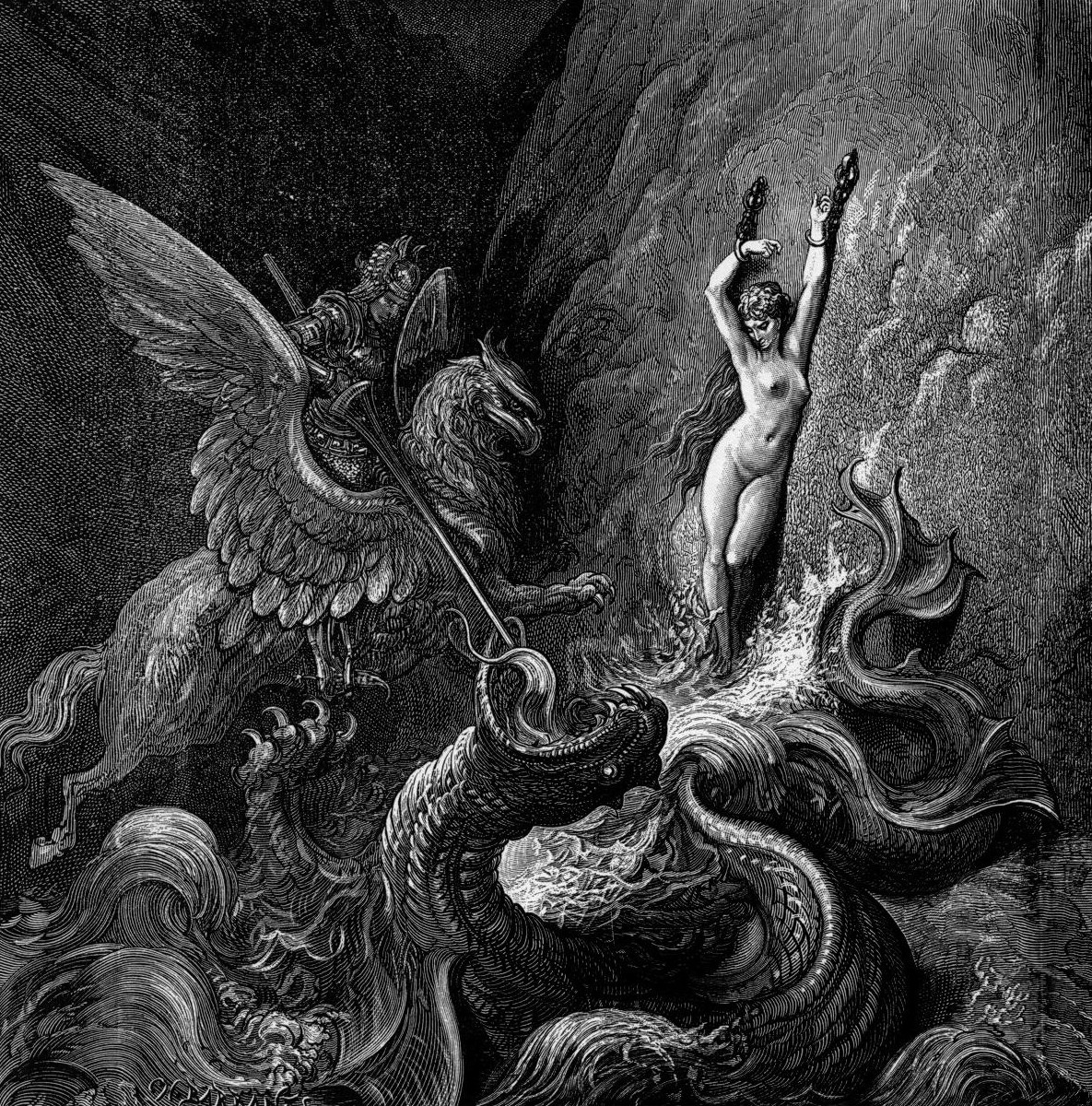
Ruggiero Rescuing Angelica, an illustration for Orlando Furioso by Gustave Doré

This dragon-slaying hero appears in medieval romances about knights-errant, such as the Russian Dobrynya Nikitich. In some variants of Tristan and Iseult, Tristan wins Iseult for his uncle, King Mark of Cornwall, by killing a dragon that was devastating her father's kingdom; he has to prove his claim when the king's steward claims to be the dragon-slayer. Ludovico Ariosto took the concept up into Orlando Furioso using it not once but twice: the rescue of Angelica by Ruggiero, and Orlando rescuing Olimpia. The monster that menaced Olimpia reconnected to the Greek myths; although Ariosto described it as a legend to the characters, the story was that the monster sprung from an offense against Proteus. In neither case did he marry the rescued woman to the rescuer. Edmund Spenser depicts St. George in The Faerie Queene, but while Una is a princess who seeks aid against a dragon, and her depiction in the opening with a lamb fits the iconography of St. George pageants, the dragon imperils her parents' kingdom, and not her alone. Many tales of dragons, ending with the dragon-slayer marrying a princess, do not precisely fit this cliché because the princess is in no more danger than the rest of the threatened kingdom.

An unusual variant occurs in Child ballad 34, Kemp Owyne, where the dragon is the maiden; the hero, based on Ywain from Arthurian legend, rescues her from the transformation with three kisses.

Mythological comparativist Julien d'Huy ran an analytical study of the antiquity and diffusion of the snake- or dragon-battling mytheme in different cultural traditions.

Scholarship suggests a connection between the episode of the dragon-slaying by the hero and the journey on an eagle's back, akin to the Mesopotamian myth of Etana.

== Modern versions ==
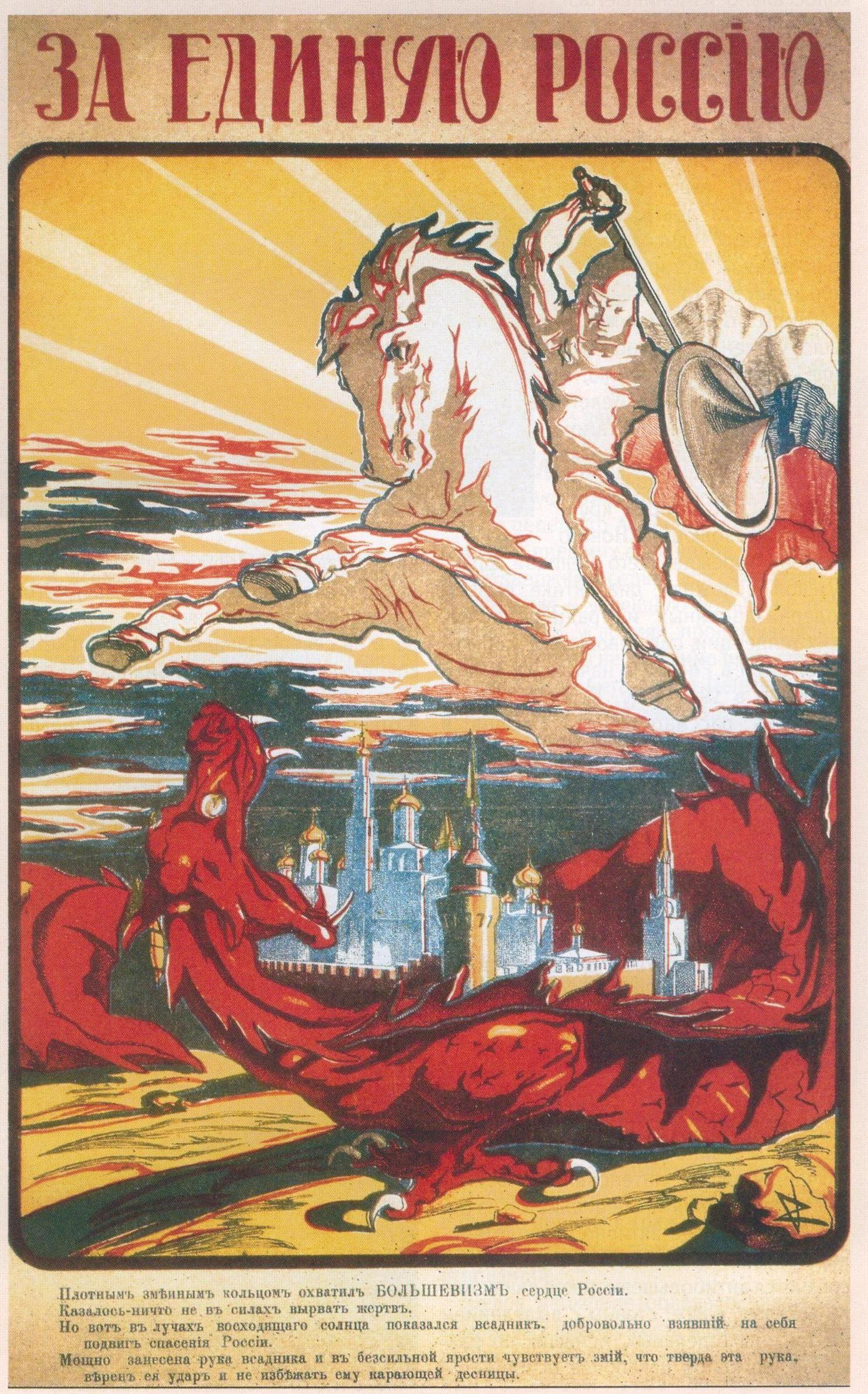
Russian civil war propaganda poster from 1919: White Russian knight is fighting the Red Russian dragon

In the 1959 animated film Sleeping Beauty, Walt Disney concluded the tale by having the wicked fairy Maleficent transform herself into a dragon to withstand the prince, converting the fairy tale to one with the princess and dragon theme.

In Ian Fleming's Dr. No, both the book and film versions feature a tank in the shape of a dragon that protects Dr. No's island from superstitious intruders. James Bond and Honeychile Rider are menaced by the "dragon", destroy it, have their friend Quarrel killed and are captured by the crew of the Dragon tank. Ann Boyd's 1967 book The Devil with James Bond explores the theory of the updating of the Princess and dragon genre.

In modern fantasy works, the dragon may hold the princess captive instead of eating her. Patricia Wrede spoofed this concept in Dealing with Dragons.

A feminist subversion of the concept for young readers is Robert Munsch's The Paper Bag Princess, in which a princess outwits a dragon to save a prince (her betrothed, whom she proceeds not to marry upon him insulting her makeshift clothing instead of thanking her).

In Jay Williams's tale The Practical Princess, a dragon demands that a king should sacrifice his daughter to him so that he will leave the rest of the kingdom alone. But the princess saves herself by making a "princess dummy" out of straw and filling it with boiling pitch and tar. The princess dresses the straw dummy in one of her own gowns, then goes to the dragon's cave where she offers herself as a sacrifice. The unwitting dragon swallows the dummy whole, and the pitch and tar explode inside the dragon's stomach, killing him. Afterwards, the princess observes, "Dragons are not very smart."

In the Isaac Asimov short story Prince Delightful and the Flameless Dragon, it is revealed that Dragons used to be slain as part of a passage from princehood to adulthood, though after a while, they became a protected species. Contrary to popular myth, they do not eat princesses as they tend to smell of cheap perfume and give indigestion.

In animated television series Wander Over Yonder episode, "The Hero", Sir Brad Starlight, the bumbling knight who believes in fairy tales, sets off to rescue the princess from the dragon king. However, it turns out that the princess and the dragon king are in love with each other and are engaged to be married; as the dragon himself is actually a good guy and the princess herself does not need to be rescued.

== Interpretations ==
In his study on the historical roots of the wondertale, Russian scholar Vladimir Propp interpreted the dragonslaying tale (ATU 300) as an inversion of the ancient ritual of a maiden sacrifice to a river to ensure good crops. Propp speculated that, in regards to this practice, the hero would be seen as a "profaner" of the ritual, but, as time passed, the maiden sacrifice was discarded and the hero was elevated.

== Diversions ==
In some stories, mostly in more recent literary works, the cliché involving princesses and dragons is somehow twisted to create a more exciting or humorous effect. For example, in The Paper Bag Princess, the princess came to realize that her prince was even more obnoxious than the dragon, and refused to go with him, preferring to skip off into the setting sun alone instead. In some versions, the princess may also befriend, tame, personally defeat, or even be turned into a dragon herself. Indeed, there are a few examples when a curse or spell transforms a princess into a dragon or similar creature (e.g. an alligator, giant bird, or fictional reptile species). In such stories, the transformed princess usually aids her sweetheart in a battle against a force of evil. In The Swan Princess, for example, Princess Odette is transformed into a swan, and she helps her lover triumph in a battle against the sorcerer Rothbart, who has the power to transform himself into a hideous beast (a manifestation of a lion, wolf, bear and bat).

== Tales with princesses and dragons ==
=== Mythology ===
- Andromeda
- Hesione
- Þóra Borgarhjǫrtr, rescued from a serpent by Ragnar Lodbrok
- Nikita the Tanner, Russian bogatyr who fights Zmey Gorynych

=== Folk and fairy tales ===
- Dobrynya Nikitich, a bogatyr who fights a Slavic dragon
- The Dragon with Seven Heads in Italo Calvino's Italian Folktales
- The Two Brothers, collected by the Brothers Grimm
- The Twins
- The Knights of the Fish
- The Dragon of the North
- The Dragon and the Prince
- The Three Dogs
- The Three Princes and their Beasts
- The Nine Peahens and the Golden Apples
- The Sea-Maiden
- The Thirteenth Son of the King of Erin
- The Bold Knight, the Apples of Youth, and the Water of Life
- The Little Bull-Calf
- The Three Enchanted Princes
- The Merchant
- Georgic and Merlin
- Saint George and the Dragon
- Cesarino di Berni (The Facetious Nights of Straparola)
- Ileana Simziana
- Ileana Cosânzeana, rescued by Făt-Frumos from the Zmeu ou Balaur
- Kulshedra, a creature in Albanian folklore that sometimes guards the fairy or princess Beauty of the Earth
- The Flower Queen's Daughter

=== Literature ===
- Orlando Furioso by Ludovico Ariosto
- Guards! Guards! by Terry Pratchett
- Dragon-in-Distress by E. G. Castle (here, the princess's and the dragon's roles are reversed)
- When Princesses Are Pawns by E. G. Cramer

=== Modern media ===
==== Animated and live-action films ====
- Sleeping Beauty (1959)
- Dragonslayer (1981)
- Conan the Barbarian (1982)
- Shrek (2001)
- Scooby-Doo and the Cyber Chase (2001)
- The Legend of Pipi (2022)
- Damsel (2024)

==== Television ====
- Adventure Time – "Bonnie and Neddy"
- Blazing Dragons (here, the knight's and the dragon's roles are reversed)
- Merlin
- SpongeBob SquarePants – "Dunces and Dragons"

==== Video games ====
- Dragon's Lair (1983)
- Dragon Buster (1984)
- Hydlide (1984) and its remake, Virtual Hydlide (1995)
- Dragon Quest (1986)
- King's Quest III: To Heir Is Human (1986)
- Castle Master (1990)
- King's Bounty: The Legend (2008)
- Hoard (2010)
- Dragon's Dogma (2012)
- Dragon's Crown (2013)

== Tales with princesses and similar perils ==
=== Mythology ===
- the Ramayana

=== Folk and fairy tales ===
- The Giant Who Had No Heart in His Body
- The Red Ettin
- Soria Moria Castle
- Snow-White-Fire-Red
- Shortshanks
- Tritill, Litill, and the Birds
- The Death of Koschei the Deathless
- The Crystal Ball
- The Flea
- Schippeitaro
- The Three Princesses of Whiteland

=== Literature ===
- Ruslan and Ludmila by Alexander Pushkin
- The Castle of Llyr by Lloyd Alexander
- The Tale of Despereaux by Kate DiCamillo
- Castle in the Air by Diana Wynne Jones

=== Modern media ===
==== Animated and live-action films ====
- The Princess and the Pirate (1944)
- Marco Polo Junior Versus the Red Dragon (1972)
- Star Wars: A New Hope (1977)
- The Castle of Cagliostro (1979)
- Star Wars: Return of the Jedi (1983)
- Fire and Ice (1983)
- Deathstalker (1983)
- Conan the Destroyer (1984)
- Wizards of the Lost Kingdom (1985)
- Castle in the Sky (1986)
- Felix the Cat: The Movie (1989)
- Aladdin (1992)
- Son of the Pink Panther (1993)
- Hercules (1997)
- Atlantis: The Lost Empire (2001)
- Mickey, Donald, Goofy: The Three Musketeers (2004)
- 1½ Knights: In Search of the Ravishing Princess Herzelinde (2008)
- Jack the Giant Slayer (2013)

==== Television ====
- Black Mirror – "The National Anthem"
- Sleepy Princess in the Demon Castle
- El-Hazard

==== Video games ====
- Wizard and the Princess (1980)
- Princess Tomato in the Salad Kingdom (1984)
- Super Mario series (1985–present)
- Ghosts 'n Goblins series (1985–2021)
- King's Quest II: Romancing the Throne (1985)
- Pit Pot (1985)
- The Legend of Zelda series (1986–present)
- Kid Niki: Radical Ninja (1986)
- Final Fantasy (1987) and its prequel, Stranger of Paradise: Final Fantasy Origin (2022)
- Wizards & Warriors (1987) and its sequel, Wizards & Warriors X: The Fortress of Fear (1990)
- Dragon Spirit (1987) and its sequel, Dragon Spirit: The New Legend (1990)
- Prince of Persia (1989)
- Astyanax (1989)
- Fire Emblem: Shadow Dragon and the Blade of Light (1990) and its remake, Fire Emblem: Shadow Dragon (2008)
- Dragon's Lair II: Time Warp (1990)
- Marvel Land (1990)
- The Rescue of Princess Blobette (1990)
- Snow Bros. (1990) and its sequel, Snow Bros. 2: With New Elves (1994)
- Battletoads (1991)
- Shining in the Darkness (1991)
- Xexex (1991)
- Kaeru no Tame ni Kane wa Naru (1992)
- Rocket Knight Adventures (1993)
- Bomberman Hero (1998)
- Shining Soul II (2003)
- Sonic the Hedgehog (2006)
- Final Fantasy: The 4 Heroes of Light (2009)
- HarmoKnight (2012)
- Slay the Princess (2023)

== Gallery ==
=== Perseus and Andromeda ===
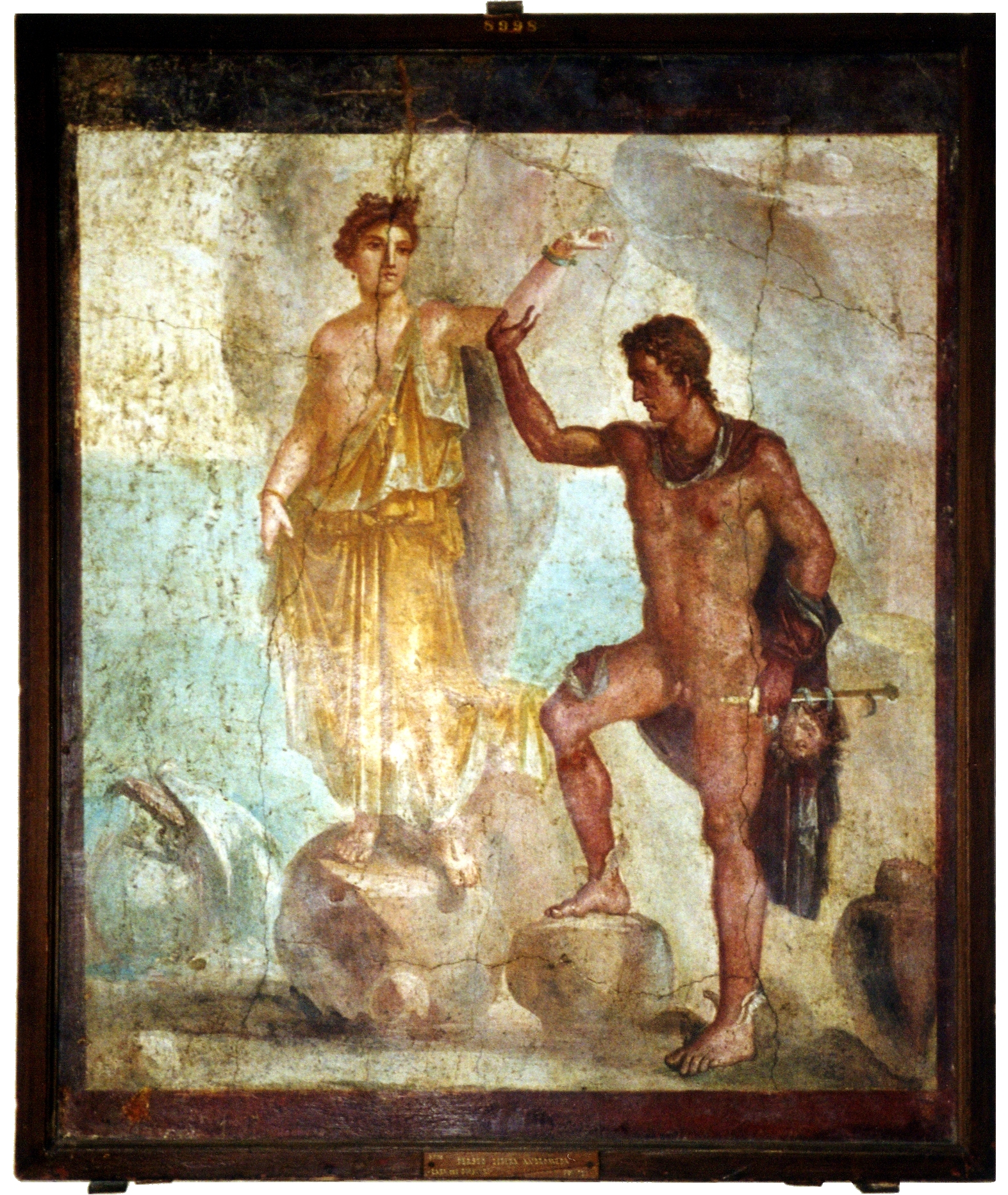
Perseus Freeing Andromeda After Killing Cetus, 1st century AD fresco from the Casa Dei Dioscuri, Pompeii.

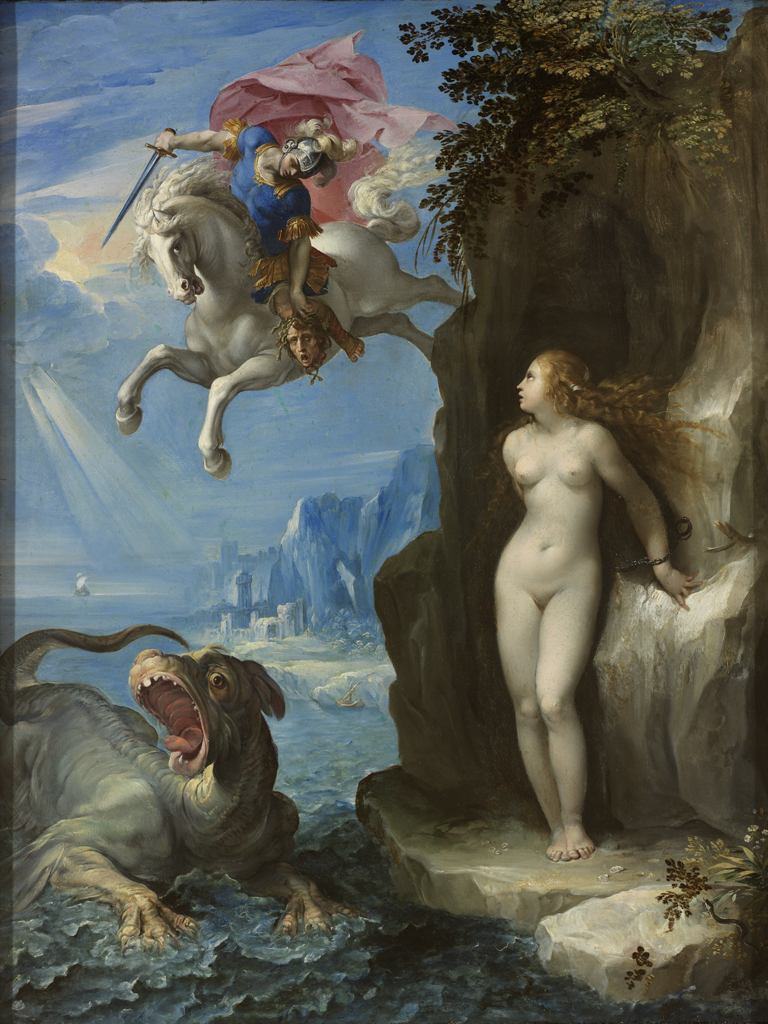
Perseus and Andromeda, by Giuseppe Cesari, 1592.

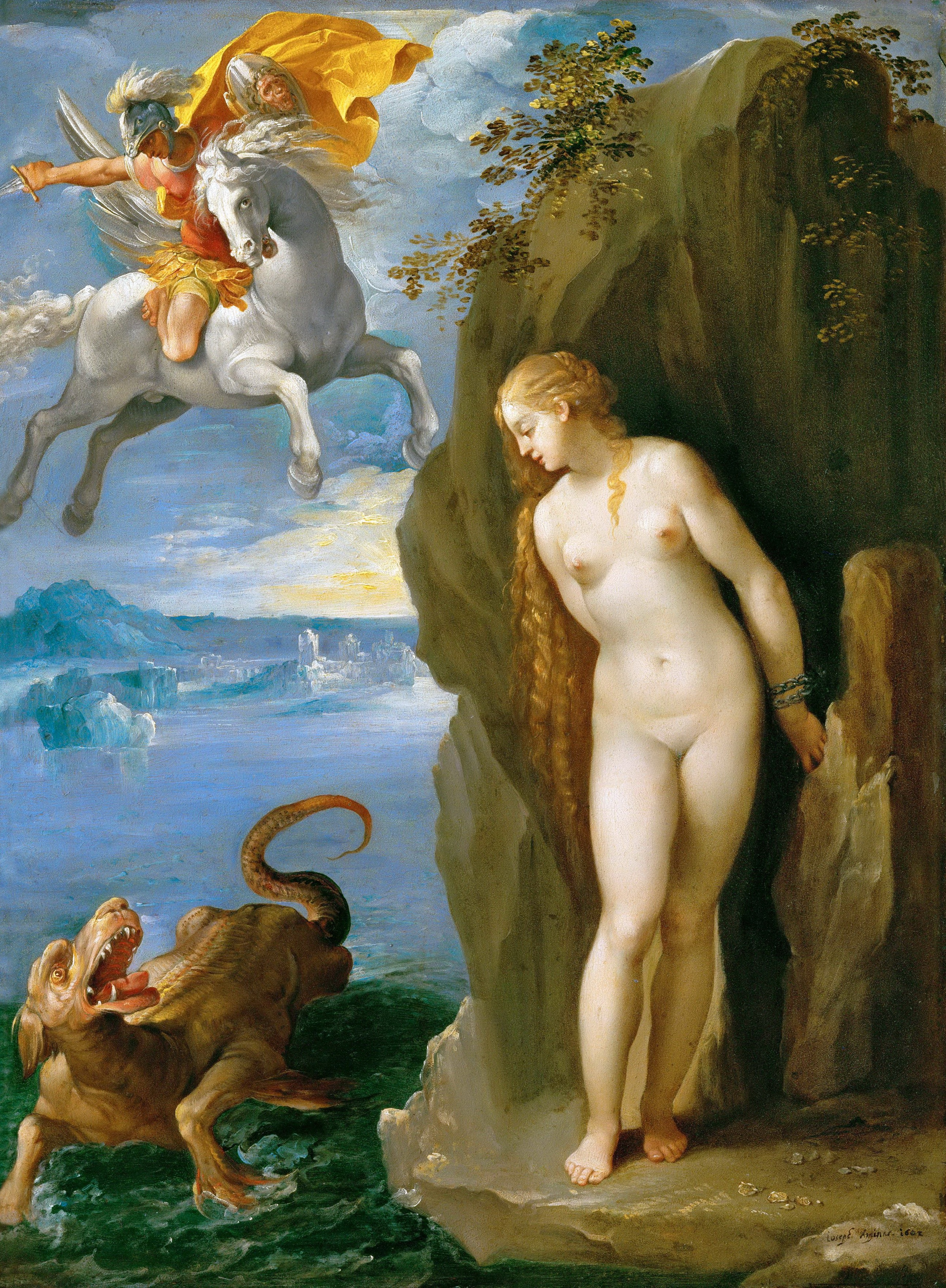
Perseus and Andromeda by Giuseppe Cesari, 1602.

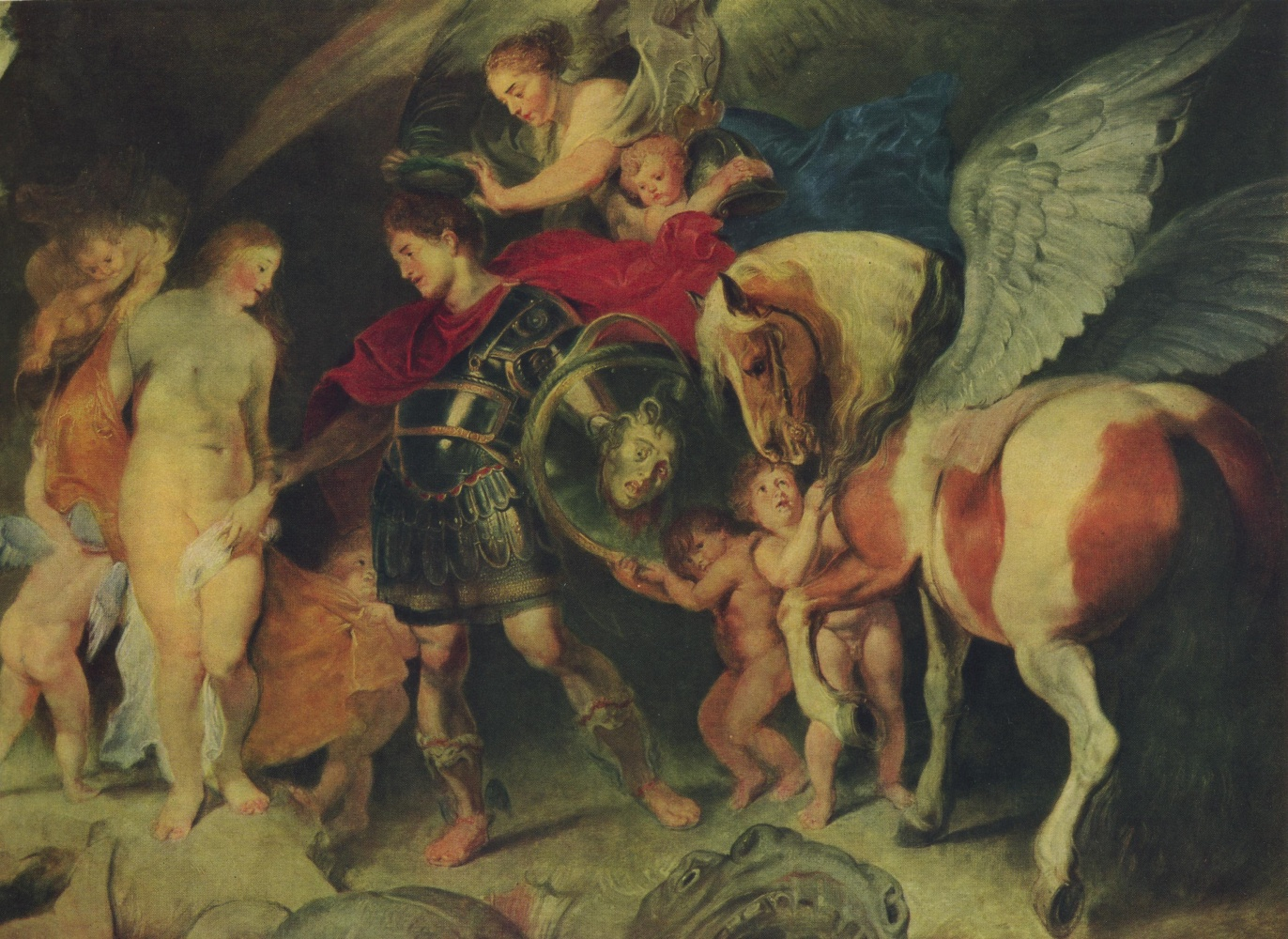
Perseus and Andromeda by Peter Paul Rubens, circa 1620-21.

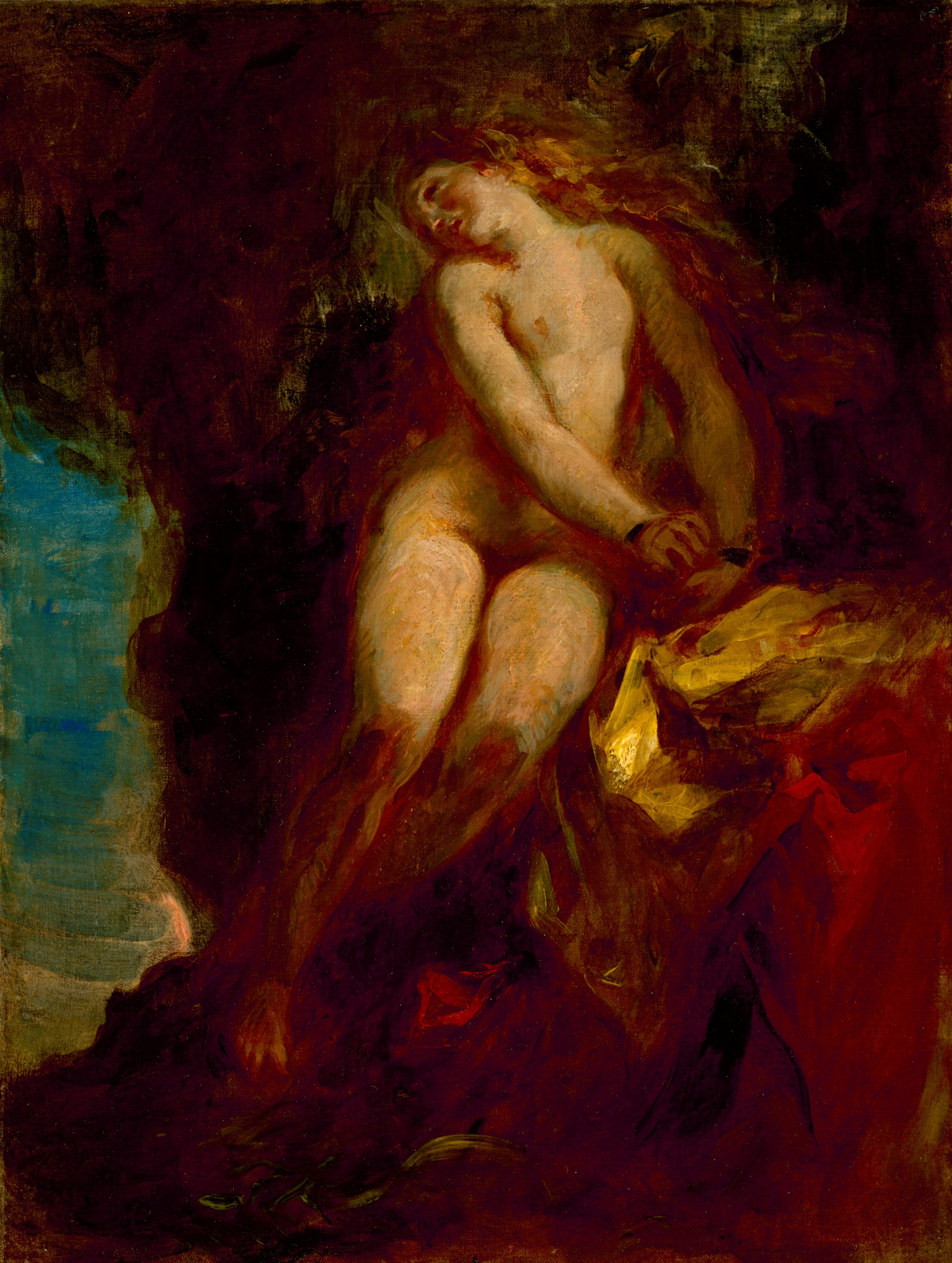
Andromeda by Eugène Delacroix. 1852.

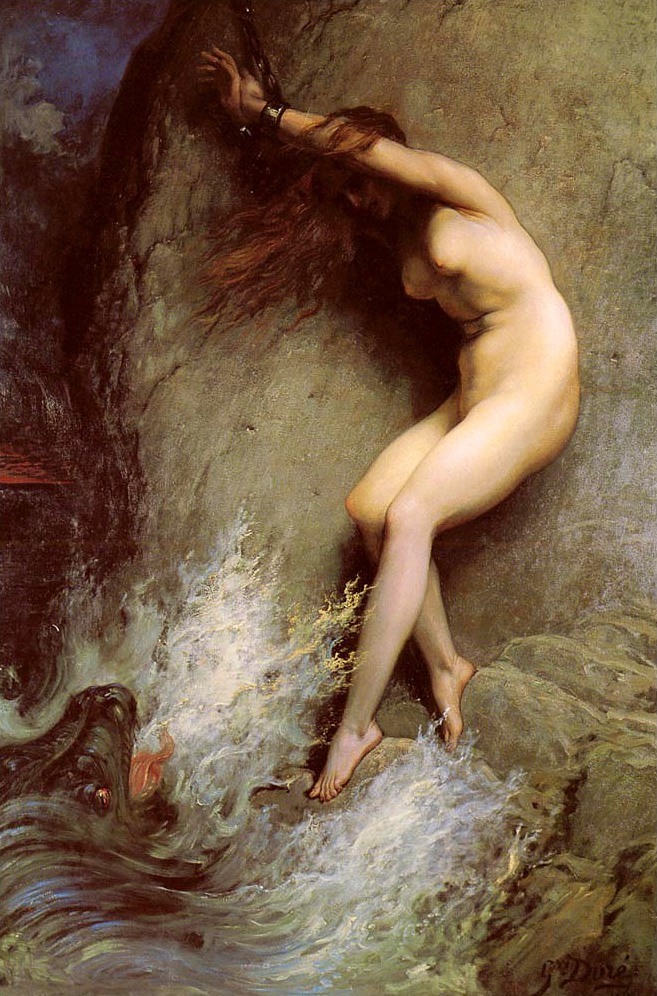
Andromeda by Gustave Doré, 1869.

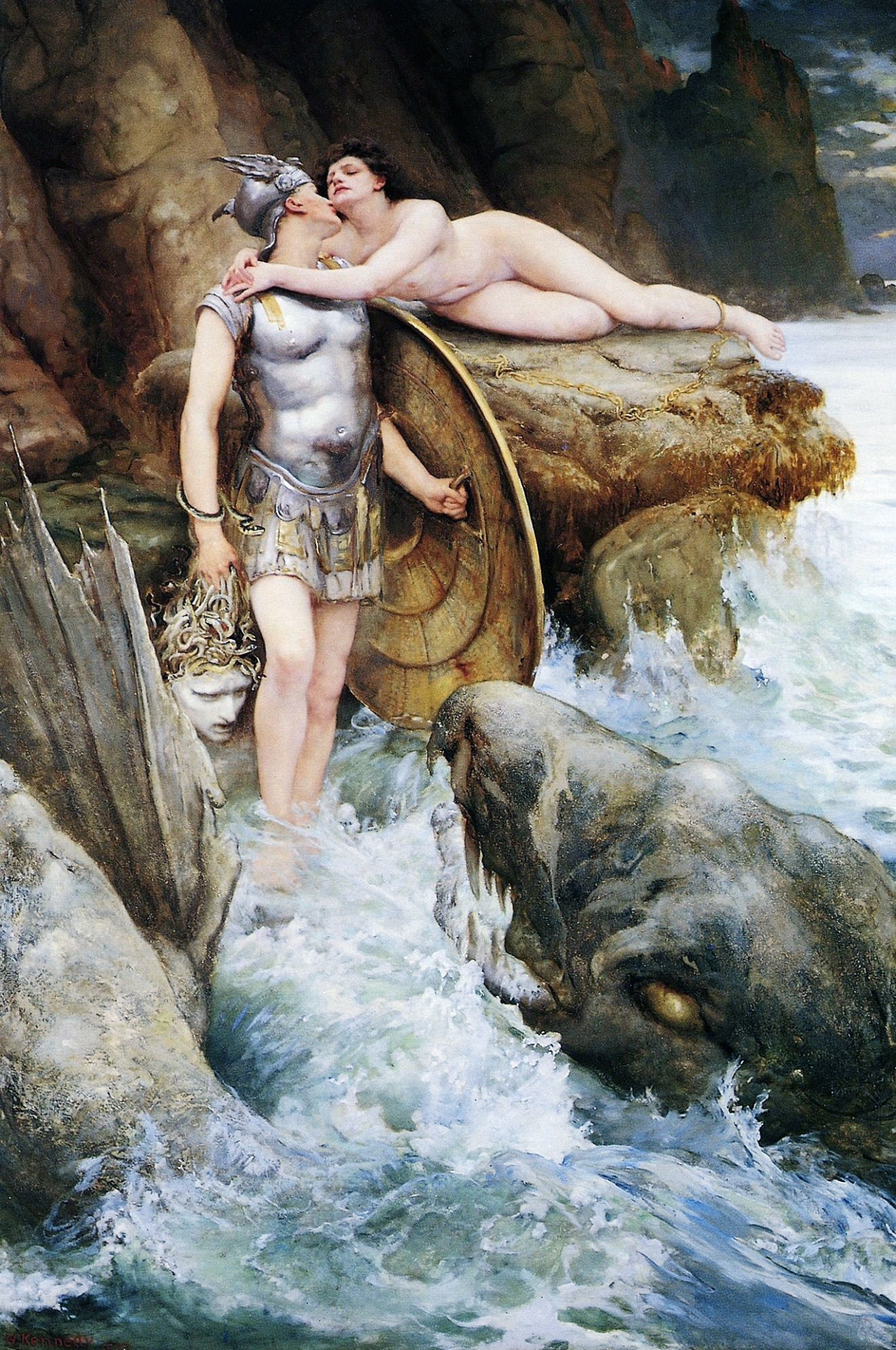
Perseus and Andromeda by Charles Napier Kennedy, 1892

=== St. George and the Dragon ===
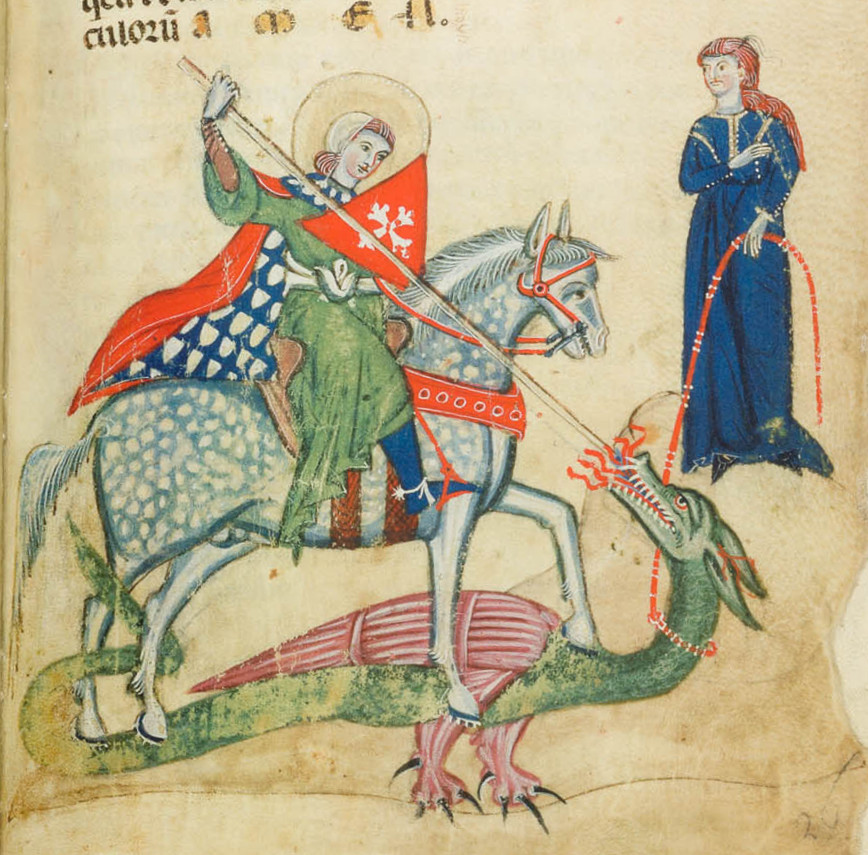
St. George and the Dragon, 1270.

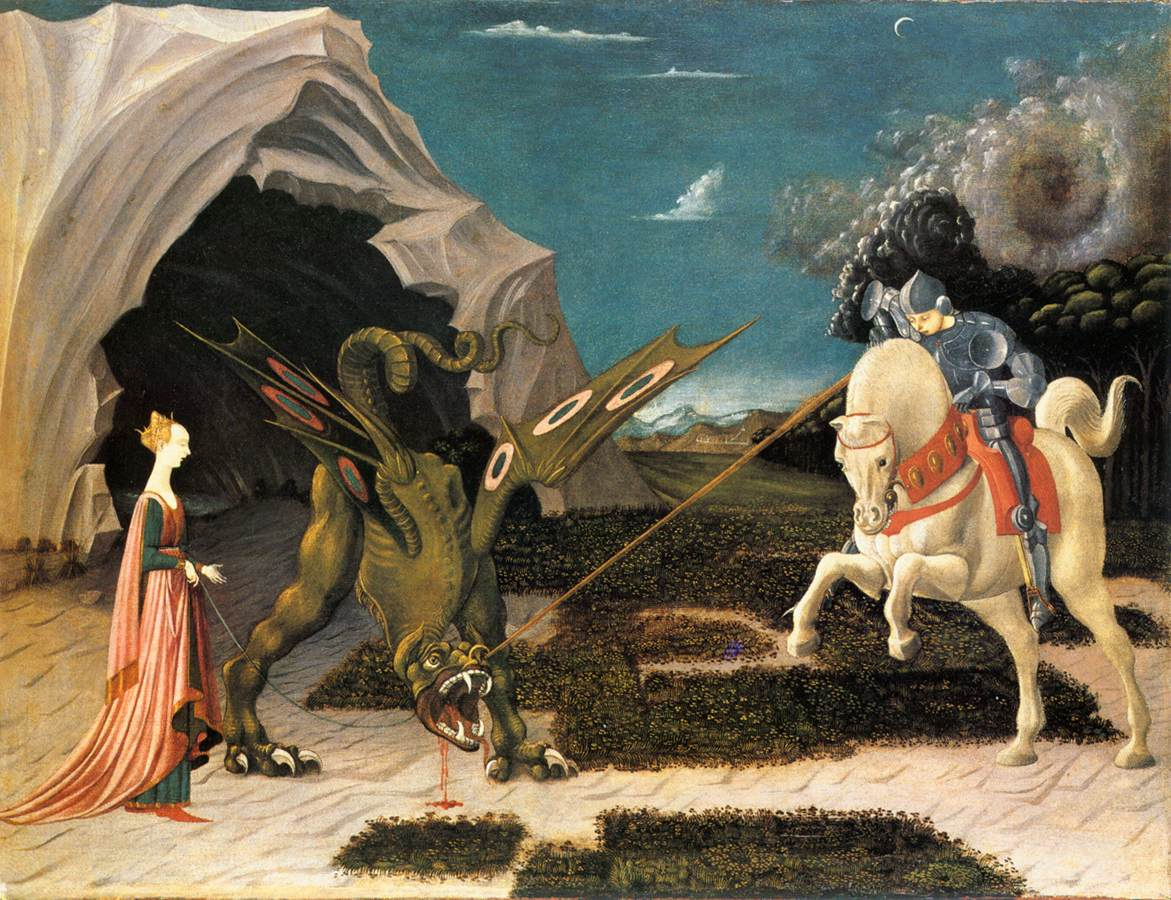
Saint George and the Dragon by Paolo Uccello, 1456.

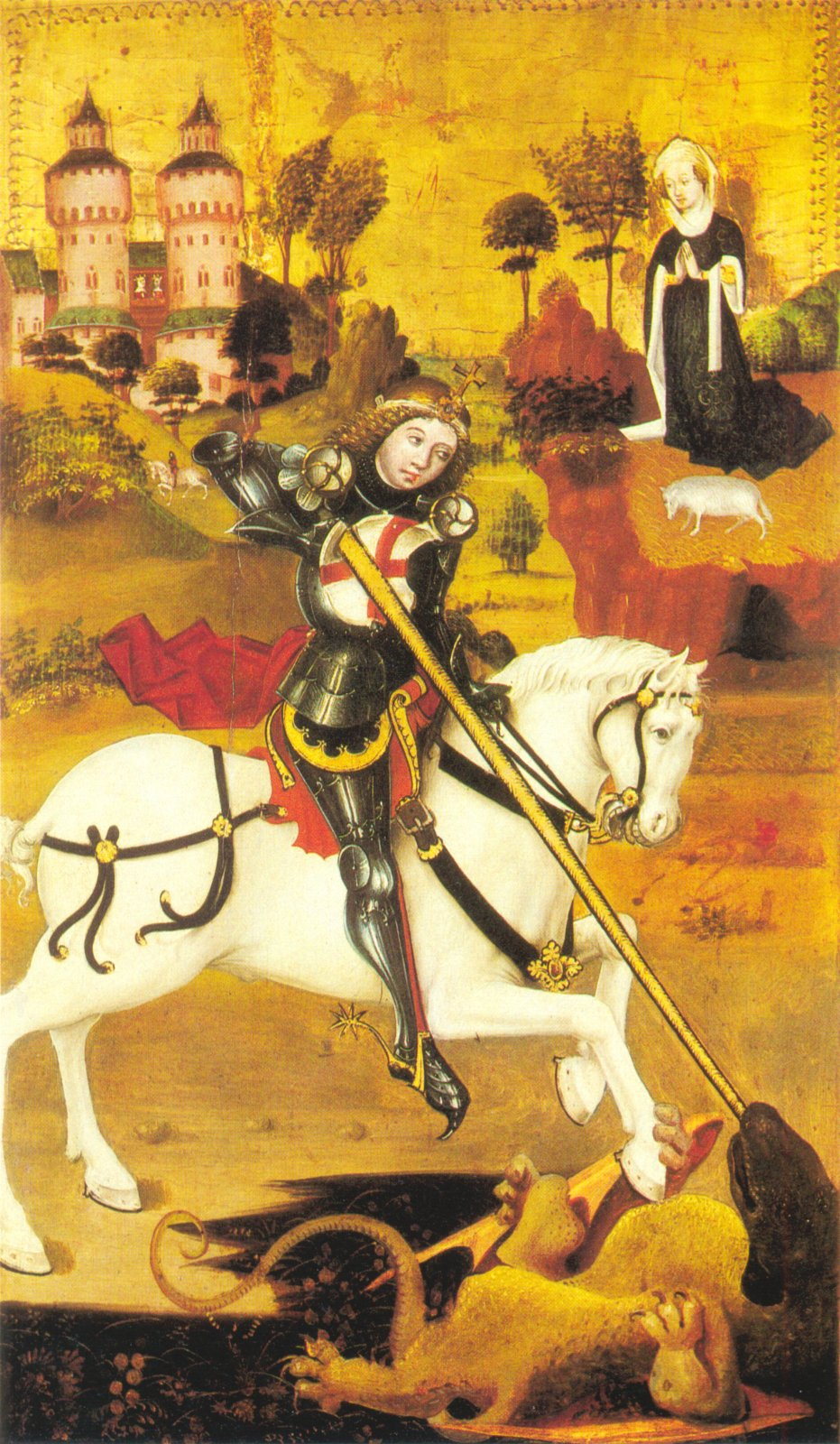
St. George and the Dragon, 1470.

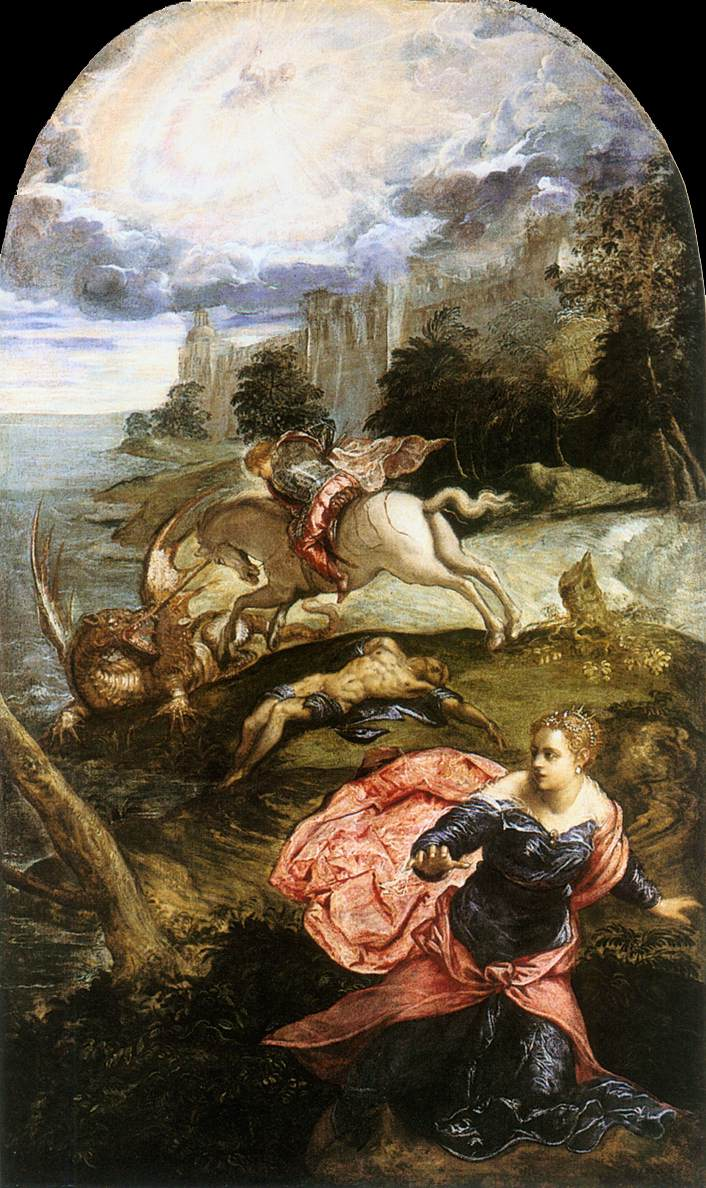
St. George and the Dragon by Jacopo Tintoretto, 1555.

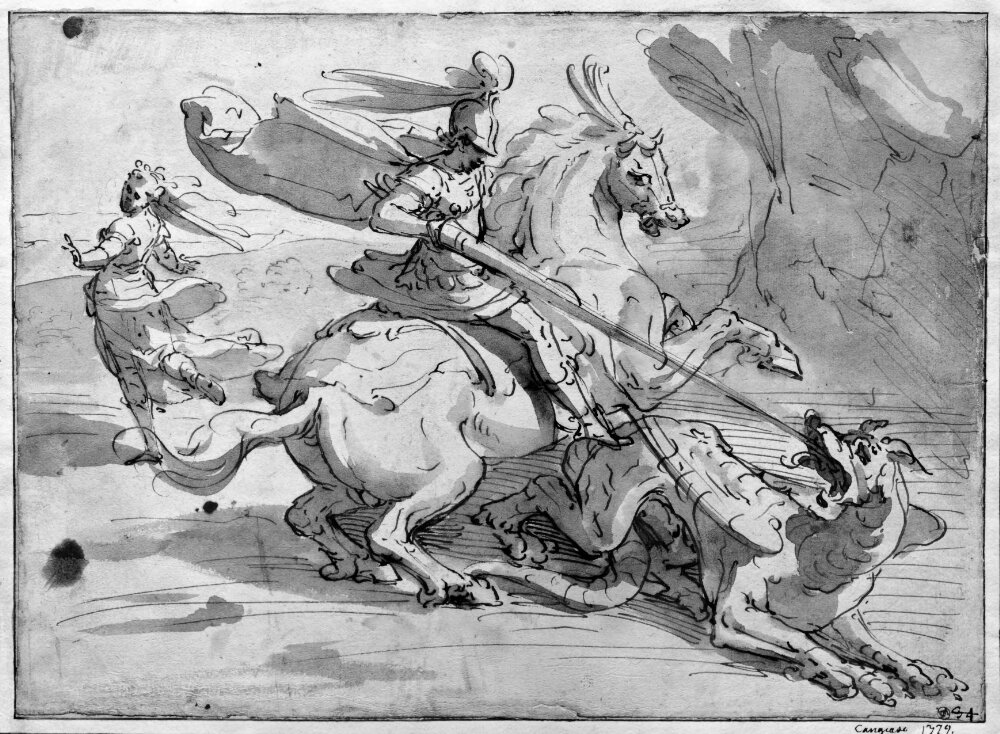
St. George and the Dragon, by Luca Cambiaso, 1570

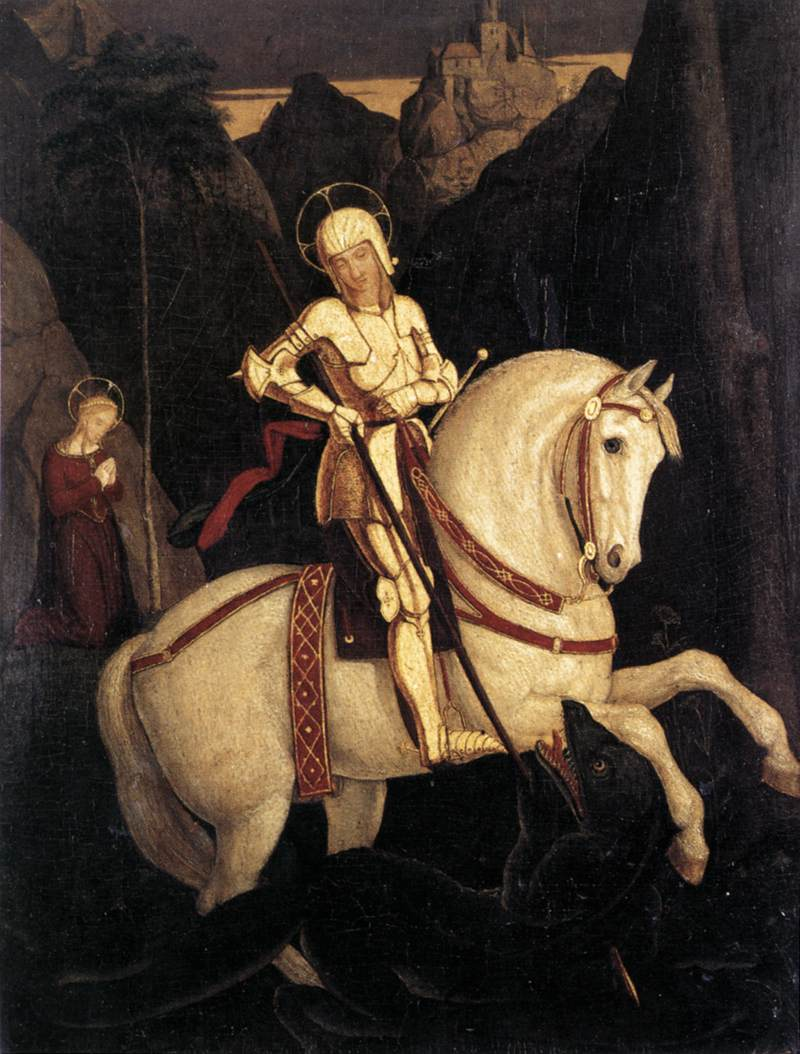
St. George and the Dragon by Franz Pforr, 1807.

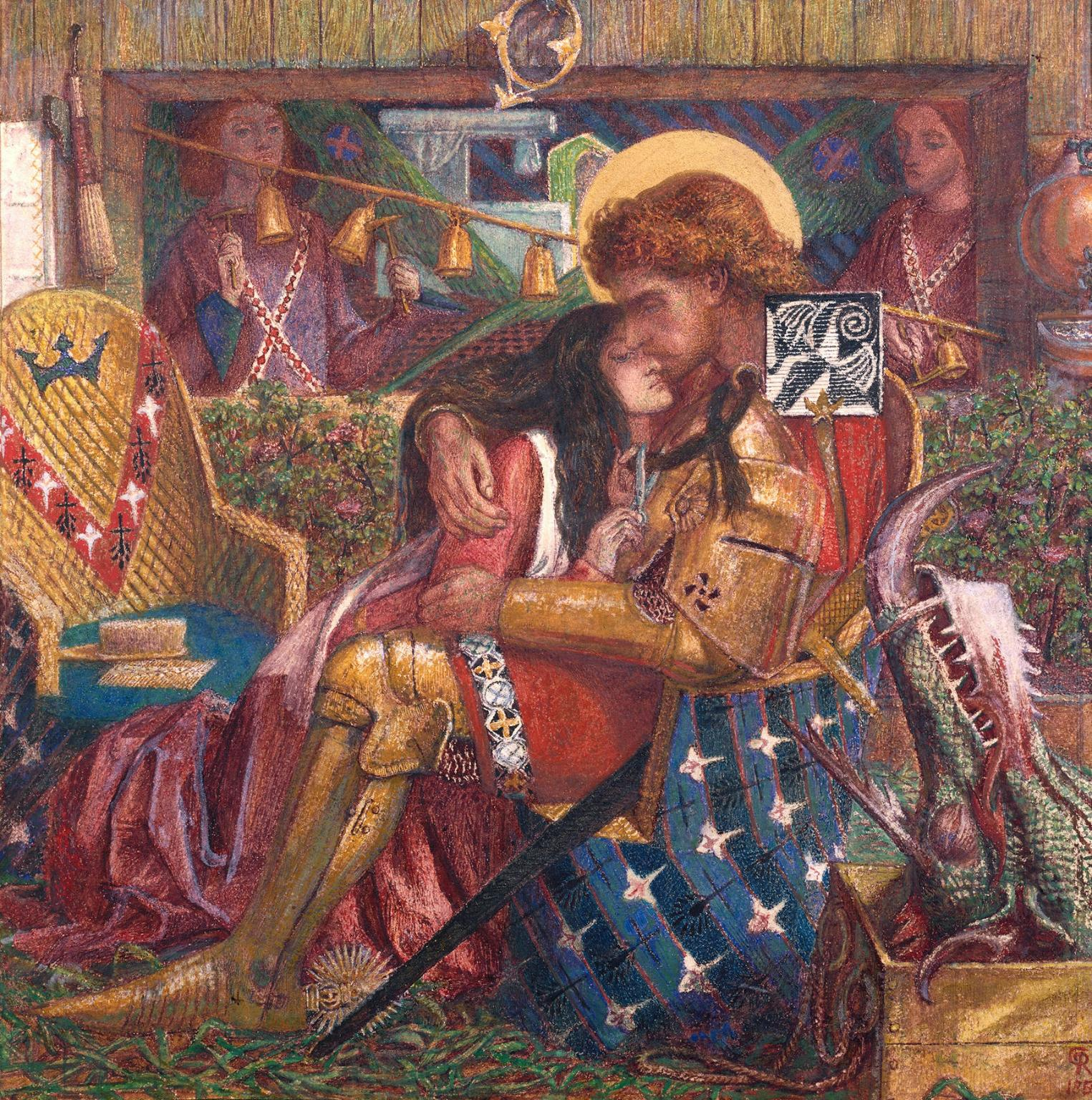
The Wedding of St. George and Princess Sabra, by Dante Gabriel Rossetti, 1857.

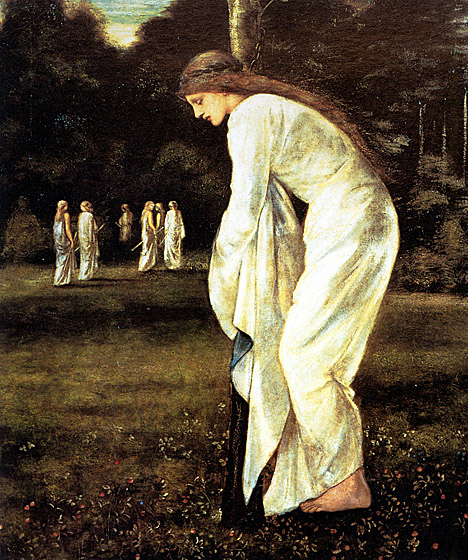
The Princess Tied to the Tree by Edward Burne-Jones, 1866.

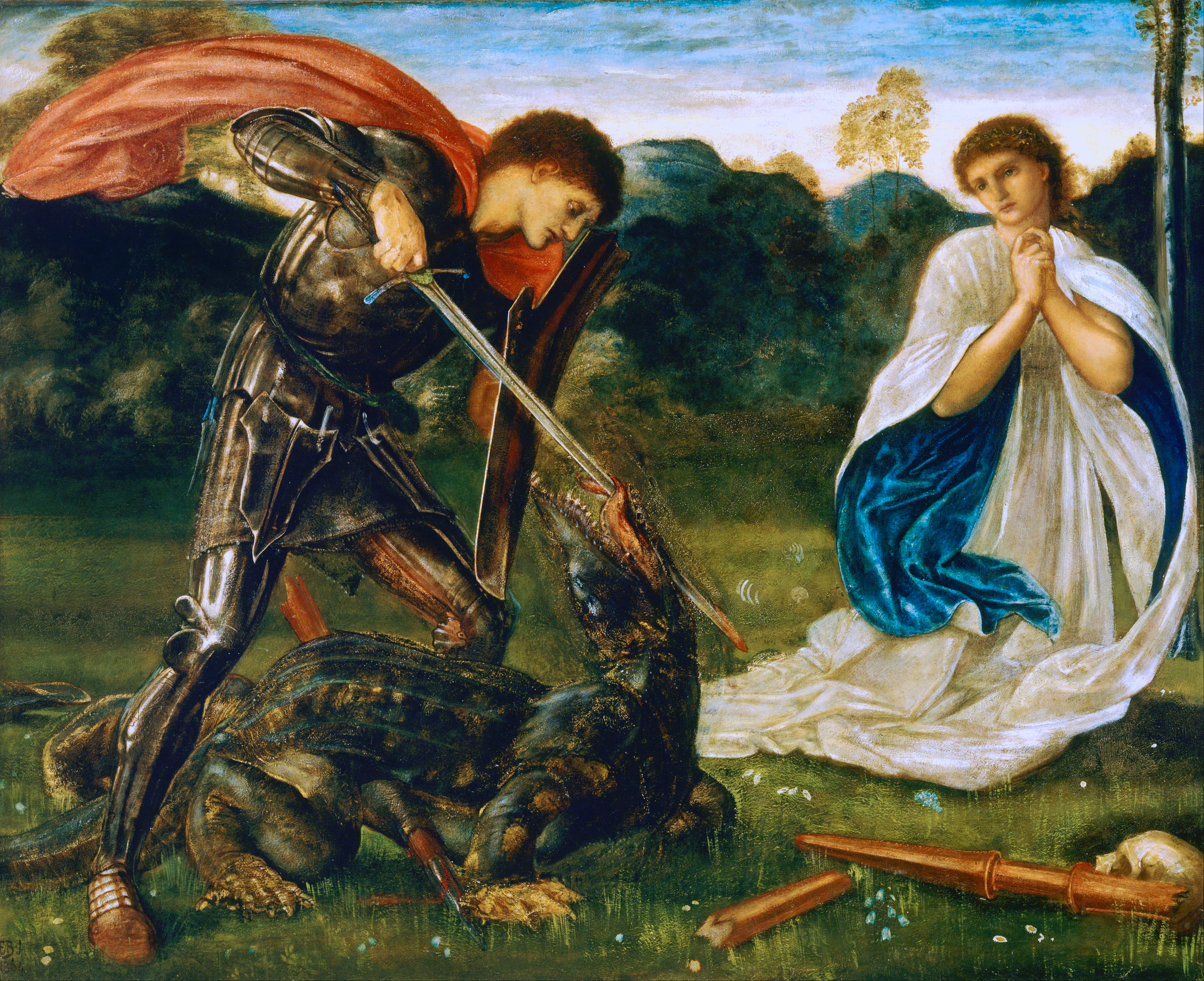
St. George Kills the Dragon, by Edward Burne-Jones, 1866.

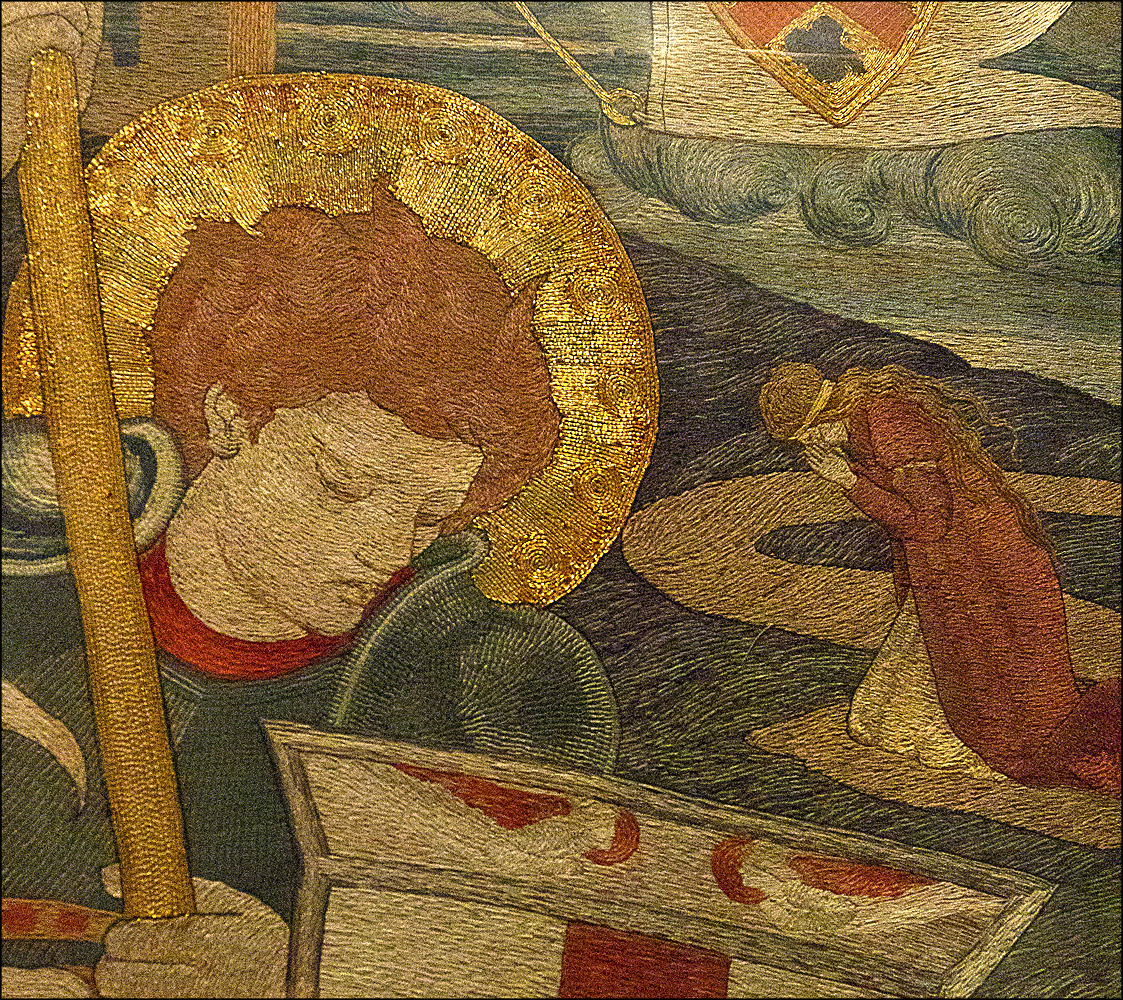
St. George Slaying the Dragon, with Una Praying in the Background, by Phoebe Anna Traquair, 1904.

== See also ==
- List of dragons in popular culture
- List of fictional princesses
