= The Bold Knight, the Apples of Youth, and the Water of Life =

Russian fairy tale

"The Bold Knight, the Apples of Youth, and the Water of Life" (Russian: Сказка о молодце-удальце, молодильных яблоках и живой воде) is a Russian fairy tale collected by Alexander Afanasyev in Narodnye russkie skazki. The tale and its variants are numbered 171-178 in the first volume of the three-volume collection.

== Synopsis ==
An old king whose sight was failing heard of a garden with apples that would make a man grow young, and water that would restore his sight. His oldest son set out and came to a pillar with different directions: on one road, his horse would be full and its rider be hungry; on the second, the youth would lose his life, and on the third, he would be full and his horse hungry. He took the third road and came to a house where a widow made him welcome. The old dame also offered to let him spend the night with her daughter Dunia. The prince accepted, but Dunia made him fall into the cellar.

The king’s second son set out and met the same fate. Finally the king’s youngest son set out, over his father's reluctance. When the boy received the same offer from the widow, he said he must go to the bathhouse first; Dunia led him to it, and he beat her until she revealed his brothers. The youngest prince freed them, but they were ashamed to go home.

Returning to his quest, the third prince rode on and found a pretty maiden weaving. She could not direct him to the fabled garden, but instead sent him on to her second sister. The second sister bade him leave his horse with her and go on a two-winged horse to their third sister. The third sister gave him a four-winged horse and told him to ensure that it leapt the wall of the garden in a single bound, or it would make bells ring and wake the witch guarding it. He tried to obey her, but the horse's hoof just grazed the wall. The sound was too soft to wake the witch. In the morning, the witch chased after him on her six-winged horse, but only caught him when he was near his own land and did not fear her. She cursed the prince, saying nothing would save him from his brothers.

The third prince found his brothers sleeping and slept by them but they stole his apples and threw him over a cliff. He fell to a dark kingdom. There, a dragon demanded a beautiful maiden every year, and this year the lot had fallen on the kingdom’s princess. The knight said he would save the princess if the king would promise to do as the youth asked; the king promised not only that but to marry him to the princess as well. They went to where the dragon was coming and he went to sleep, telling the princess to wake him. The dragon came, she could not wake the prince and began to weep, and a tear fell on his face, waking him. The youth cut off the dragon's heads, put them under a rock, and threw its body in the sea.

Another man sneaked up behind him and cut off the third prince’s head. The assassin threatened to kill the princess if she would not say that he had killed the dragon. The king arranged for the marriage, but the princess went to sea with fishermen. Each time they caught a fish, she had them throw it back, but finally, their nets caught the third prince's body and head. She put them back together and used the water of life on them. The prince comforted her and sent her home, saying he would come and make it right. He came and asked the king whether the alleged dragon slayer could find the dragon's heads. The imposter could not, but the prince could. The prince said he wanted only to go to his own country, not to marry the princess, but she did not want to be parted from him. She knew a spoonbilled bird that could carry them, if it had enough to eat. They went off with a whole ox, but it was not quite enough; the princess cut off part of her thigh to feed it. The bird carried them all the way and commented on the sweetness of the last piece of meat. She showed it what she had done, and it spat the piece back out; the prince used the water of life to restore it.

The third prince went back with his father, used the water of life, and told him what his two brothers had done. The brothers were so frightened they jumped in the river. The knight married the princess.

== Origin ==
Folklorist Alexander Afanasyev published the tale, numbered 27, in the second tome of this multi-part collection in eight volumes.

== Analysis ==
=== Tale type ===
Soon after he developed his classification of folktales, Finnish folklorist Antti Aarne published, in 1912, a study on the collections of the Brothers Grimm, Austrian consul Johann Georg von Hahn, Danish folklorist Svend Grundtvig, Swiss scholar Laura Gonzenbach and Afanasyev. According to this primary system, developed in 1910, the tale fits types 551, "The Water of Life" ("Sons on a quest for the Wonderful Remedy for their Father") and 300, "The Dragon-Slayer". Professor Regina Bendix also classifies the tale as type ATU 551. In Russian scholarship, the international tale type 551 is known as "Молодильные яблоки" ("Apples of Youth"), since in most of the variants the quest object are apples that restore youth and vitality to the ailing king, which is also the name of tale type SUS 551, of the East Slavic Folktale Classification (Russian: СУС, romanized: SUS).

=== Motifs ===
In regards to the journey on the bird's back (usually an eagle, but in this tale a spoonbill bird), folklorist scholarship recognizes its similarities with the tale of Etana helping an eagle, a tale type later classified as Aarne–Thompson–Uther ATU 537, "The Eagle as helper: hero carried on the wings of a helpful eagle".

Historical linguist Václav Blažek argues for parallels of certain motifs (the water of life, the golden apples) to Ossetian Nart sagas and the Greek myth of the Garden of the Hesperides.

== Variants ==
=== Russia ===
Alexander Afanasyev collected eight variants in his original compilation of Russian folk tales, under the banner "Сказка о молодце-удальце, молодильных яблоках и живой воде" ("Tale of The Brave Youth, the Rejuvenating Apples and the Water of Life"). In some of the variants, the king dreams that there exists a maiden of exceptional beauty that lives near the fountain that grants youth or to the garden with a tree that grows the golden apples.

Professor Jack V. Haney also translated a variant from a Pomor storyteller named P. Ia. Nikonov. In this untitled tale, "clearly of the 'Rejuvenating Apples' type", the prince searches for "the living water, the rejuvenating apples, and the fire bird".

=== Balkans ===
In a Balkanic variant, sourced as Macedonian, The Story of the Prince and the Eagle, a king is dying and sends his three sons to hunt a male hare as a cure. The youngest hunts three hares, to his brothers' envy. They conspire to kill him: while drinking water from a well, they grab him by the legs and drop him down the well. The princes return to the king with the hares and lie that a band of robbers kill the prince. In reality, the youth has been falling for three years inside the well, until the fall stops when he reaches the ground. He notices he is in "the Nether World" and sees a light in the distance. He arrives at an old woman's hut, and she tells him of a terrible monster, a Lamia, with four legs and three heads, that demanded the sacrifice of a maiden every month, and this time it is her daughter, Maruda. The prince from the Upper World promises to kill the Lamia and rescue Maruda. He does, but the king and his council are not to happy about it. Maruda's mother warns them they must escape the Nether World, and suggests they take her giant golden eagle her late husband left her. They kill a giant she-buffalo to feed her, and the prince even sacrifices part of his flesh to feed the eagle so that they arrive safely at the Upper World.

== See also ==
- Prâslea the Brave and the Golden Apples
- The Blue Mountains
- The Golden Bird
- The King Of Lochlin's Three Daughters
- The Knights of the Fish
- The Story of Bensurdatu
- The Three Dogs
- The Three Princes and their Beasts
- The Water of Life
