= The Enchanted Doe =

Italian literary fairy tale written by Giambattista Basile

"The Enchanted Doe" is an Italian literary fairy tale written by Giambattista Basile in his 1634 work, the Pentamerone.

== Synopsis ==
A king is desperate for a child. Following the instructions of a pilgrim, he has a young maiden prepare the heart of a sea dragon for his wife. Both women fall pregnant and birth identical boys. The child of the queen is named Fonzo and the child of the young maiden is named Canneloro.

The queen becomes jealous of how close the two boys are and tries to kill Canneloro. Canneloro survives the attempt, and resolves to leave. A despondent Fonzo begs him to leave a token. He leaves a fountain and myrtle plant that show whether he is well, in trouble, or dead.

Canneloro does well in the world, winning the hand of a princess. Bored, he goes hunting. He is trapped by an ogre who tricked him by transforming into a doe. Fonzo sees from the token that Canneloro is in trouble, and rescues him. Canneloro reflects that "Unhappy is he who corrects himself at his own cost".

== Story ==
A king, named Giannone, wished for a child. He was charitable towards beggars, hoping his generosity would win the favour of the gods and grant his wish. He continued until all his money was spent, but still he had no child. He shut himself into a tower, shooting at anyone who came near with a crossbow. One day, a pilgrim came. He told the king that if the queen ate the heart of a sea-dragon, prepared by a young maiden, she would have a child. The king had this done, and the queen gave birth to a boy. However, the young maiden, a servant, gave birth at exactly the same moment. The two boys were identical. The queen's child was named Fonzo, and the servant's child was named Canneloro.

The boys were inseparable, and the queen became jealous of Canneloro. She hated that Fonzo loved the child of a servant better than her. One day, Fonzo was making bullets for hunting with Canneloro. He left to get something, and while he was gone his mother came to look for him. Instead of her son, she found Canneloro, and thought to kill him. She took a hot bullet-mold and threw it at Canneloro. This left an ugly wound, but did not kill him. She prepared to throw it again, but was stopped by Fonzo returning. She left quickly, pretending she did nothing. Canneloro, hiding his wound from Fonzo, asked to be released from his service and go out into the world. He refused to tell Fonzo the reason. Fonzo tearfully agreed, but insisted that he leave a token. Canneloro stuck his dagger into the ground, opening a fountain. He told Fonzo that it would show him the course of Canneloro's life. If it ran clear, he was well. If it ran turbid, he was in trouble. If it went dry, he was dead. He then stuck his sword into the ground, growing a plant of myrtle. If it was green, he was well. If it was withering, he was in trouble. If it died, he too was dead. The two boys embraced, and Canneloro set out.

Canneloro had many adventures. One day he came across a tournament. The winner was to marry the princess Fenicia. He won, and married her. After some months, he became restless, and wanted to set out hunting. Fenicia's father, the king, told him not to. He warned him of a shapeshifting ogre, but Canneloro did not listen. The ogre, transformed into a doe, led Canneloro to its cave. It was a cold evening, so Canneloro sheltered inside and started a fire. The doe reappeared at the mouth of the cave, and asked Canneloro to let it warm itself by the fire. Canneloro agreed. The doe then claimed to be afraid, and convinced Canneloro to tie up his dogs, tie up his horse and bind his sword. The doe then transformed back into an ogre. The ogre captured Canneloro and imprisoned him in a pit.

Fonzo, who checked the fountain and myrtle twice daily, quickly noticed that the fountain was turbid and the myrtle withered. Worried about Canneloro, he quickly left home with his two enchanted dogs. He travelled far. Finally, he found the city where Canneloro had married. He found the city to be in mourning for Canneloro, who they thought dead. He went to court. There, Fenecia mistook him for Canneloro. She scolded him for going on a dangerous hunt, and mentioned the ogre. Fonzo concluded that Canneloro must be at the ogre's lair.

The next morning, the ogre lured him to the cave the same way it had lured Canneloro. However, seeing Canneloro's dogs and horses tied up, Fonzo did not fall for the trick. Instead, he killed the doe with his dogs. He found Canneloro, and freed him with great joy. They went back to Fenecia, who recognized Canneloro by his scar. After some time together, Fonzo returned home. Canneloro sent a message to his mother with Fonzo, asking her to come live with him and Fenecia. She did. The story ends with Canneloro recalling the saying: "Unhappy is he who corrects himself at his own cost."

== See also ==
- Tale of Tales (2015 film) § The Queen
- The Fisherman and His Wife
- The Gold-Children
- The Knights of the Fish
- The Three Princes and their Beasts
- The Two Brothers
