= Tritill, Litill, and the Birds =

Tritill, Litill, and the Birds is a Hungarian fairy tale. Andrew Lang included it in The Crimson Fairy Book.

A version of the tale also appears in A Book of Ogres and Trolls, by Ruth Manning-Sanders. That version is said to come from Iceland.

== Synopsis ==
A king's beautiful daughter vanished without a trace. The king proclaimed that whoever returned with her could marry her.

Near, a peasant couple had three sons; the older two were indulged, and the youngest always had to give way to his brothers. The oldest set out to seek his fortune. He refused food to two beggars and threw stones at birds that looked for crumbs. He went to sleep in a cave, but an ogress returned. She agreed to let him stay only if he would do a task in the morning, and then she set him to sweep out the cave. The dirt would not move, and the ogress hit him over the head, killing him. And the second brother followed and met the same fate.

The parents continued to mistreat their youngest, so he also set out. He gave some food to the first beggar, who told him to call his name, Tritill, if he needed help, and the same with the second, Litill, and he crumbed some of his bread for the birds, who also told him to call for help. He found the same cave and realized from bones and scraps of cloth that it was an ogress's lair, but remained. When she set him to sweep the floor, he called on Tritill, who did it for him.

The second day, the ogress set him to spread the feathers from her pillows to dry them and put them all back. He spread them out, a breeze carried them off, and he called on Tritill, Litill, and the birds. They put the feathers back. The third day, the ogress set him to slaughter one of her fifty oxen, but she would not tell him which one. He called on Tritill and Litill, who slaughtered one and told him to ask for what lay on the bed, the chest at her bed's foot, and what lay under the cave's side. These proved to be the princess, a chest filled with gold and jewels, and a magical ship that moved over land and sea. He brought this all to the king, who agreed to the marriage.

== See also ==
- Shortshanks
- The Red Ettin
