= Shortshanks =

Norwegian fairy tale

Shortshanks is a Norwegian fairy tale collected by Peter Christen Asbjørnsen and Jørgen Moe in Norske Folkeeventyr.

== Synopsis ==
A poor couple had many children, and one day had two more sons. Both boys looked about the cottage and set off to seek their fortune so quickly that the second son had to catch up to the first. When they met, they baptized each other by their chosen names, Shortshanks and King Sturdy, and set out in different directions. King Sturdy said that Shortshanks could summon him by calling his name three times, but should do so only in the last extremity.

Shortshanks came across, in turn, three old women each of whom had only one eye; he stole each eye, and the women bought them back in return for an enchanted sword, an enchanted ship that could fly over land, and the art of brewing one hundred lasts of malt at once. He used the ship to sail to the king's castle, where he got a job working for the kitchen-maid. The castle was hung with black, and he learned that the princess had been promised to three ogres, one of whom was coming to fetch her. Ritter Red had promised to try to save her, but they do not know that he can do it.

The next day, the princess went down to the sea strand. Ritter Red went with her but, as soon as everyone else was gone, climbed a tree for safety. Shortshanks asked permission to go down to the sea and, having got it, fought the five-headed ogre that came. The princess had him sleep a time in her lap, and threw over him a tinsel robe. Ritter Red threatened to kill the princess if she told who had killed the ogre and cut out its tongue and liver. Shortshanks took the gold and silver from the ogre's ship and gave it to the kitchen-maid. He then fought the ten-headed ogre, and the princess threw a silver robe over him while he slept, after. The third day, he fought the fifteen-headed ogre, and the princess threw over him a golden robe, but before he slept, she told him what Ritter Red had done and would do, and he told her to demand him as the cup-bearer for the wedding; he would spill some of Ritter Red's wine but none of hers, and Ritter Red would strike him three times, but on the third, she was to proclaim that he was the true killer of the ogres.

Each time Ritter Red struck him, it revealed a new robe, and when the princess proclaimed the truth, Ritter Red produced the lungs and tongues, and Shortshanks the silver and gold, and the king judged that Shortshanks was the true killer and threw Ritter Red in a snake pit.

The king told Shortshanks that another ogre had carried off his older daughter. Shortshanks asked for a long iron cable, five hundred men, and food for them all, and had it put on his ship. The ship carried them to the middle of the sea. Shortshanks tied the cable to himself and descended, with orders to be pulled back up if he pulled the cable. At the bottom, he found the princess, who told him that the ogre was looking for someone who could brew one hundred lasts of malt at once, for his feast. The princess told the ogre of him, and the ogre set him to brew. He brewed the ale so strong that all the ogres died of it. Then he had the five hundred men pull up him, the princess, and the ogre's gold and silver.

Both princesses wanted to marry him, but he wanted to marry the first one he saved, the younger. He summoned his brother King Sturdy, who saw there was no danger, and struck him down. Shortshanks told him why he wanted him, and King Sturdy begged his forgiveness. Shortshanks sent him into the house, saying that whichever princess kissed him would marry him, because the older was stronger and bigger and would reach him first. So King Sturdy married the older, and Shortshanks the younger, princess.

== Translations ==
Under the title "Minnikin", it was included by Andrew Lang in The Red Fairy Book. In this version, Shortshanks is called Minnikin and King Sturdy is called King Pippin.

A version titled Lillekort was published in The Diamond Fairy Book and attributed to Xavier Marmier. In this version, Lillekort does not have a twin brother.

== See also ==
- Dapplegrim
- Graeae
- The Gold-Children
- The Two Brothers
