= The Three Dogs =

German fairy tale

The Three Dogs is a German fairy tale. Andrew Lang included it in The Green Fairy Book, listing his source as the Brothers Grimm. A version of this tale appears in A Book of Dragons by Ruth Manning-Sanders.

It is Aarne-Thompson type 562, The Spirit in the Blue Light. Other tales of this type include The Blue Light and The Tinderbox.

== Synopsis ==
A dying peasant told his son and daughter that he had only his house and three sheep to leave them; they could divide them as they wished, but must not quarrel. The brother asked his sister what she wished to have out of their inheritance. She chose the house. He told her he would take the sheep and seek his fortune. He met a stranger who offered to trade three dogs for his sheep: Salt, which would bring him food; Pepper, who would tear attackers to pieces; Mustard, who could break iron or steel with its teeth. The brother agreed and once the trade was done, asked Salt for food; it instantly gave him some.

He went on and found a town draped in black. There, he heard that a dragon demanded the tribute of a maiden every year, and this year the lot had fallen on the princess. He went to where the town folk had left her for the dragon, and set Pepper on the dragon. The dog swallowed it all except for two teeth, which the man pocketed. The princess offered to marry him for rescuing her. The man said he wanted to see the world, and would return in three years. When she was being driven back, the coachman told her that her rescuer was gone and he would kill her if she did not say that he had killed the dragon. She promised. The king said he would marry her to him as a reward, but he put off the marriage for a year, because she was so young. At the end of the year, she begged him to put it off for another, and again, for a third year. Then the wedding date was set.

The man returned, but when he said he had killed the dragon, he was thrown into prison. He called Mustard, which ate through the bars. Then he sent Salt for food. Salt went to the castle, and the princess recognized it and gave it food in a royal handkerchief. She told her father the truth, the king sent a servant to follow the dog, and the man produced the dragon's teeth to prove his story. The coachman was thrown in prison, and the man married the princess.

After a time, he remembered his sister and sent for her. The dogs appeared before him and told him they had been waiting to see if he would remember his sister. Then they turned into birds and flew into heaven.

== Motifs ==
The dragon slayer is a common motif, as in The Bold Knight, the Apples of Youth, and the Water of Life, The Three Princes and their Beasts, The Knights of the Fish, The Merchant and The Two Brothers.

Another common motif is the false hero whose wedding the hero barely arrives in time to interrupt, as in The Blue Mountains, The Raven, or The Three Princesses of Whiteland, but the hero's choice to travel is an unusual cause; normally the hero broke some prohibition, or was attacked by the false hero and severely injured, and so has difficulty reaching her.
