= The Three Princes and their Beasts =

Lithuanian fairy tale

The Three Princes and their Beasts is a Lithuanian fairy tale included by Andrew Lang in The Violet Fairy Book. The actual source was Von den drei Brüdern und ihren Thieren from August Leskien und K. Brugman, in Litauische Volkslieder und Märchen (1882).

== Synopsis ==
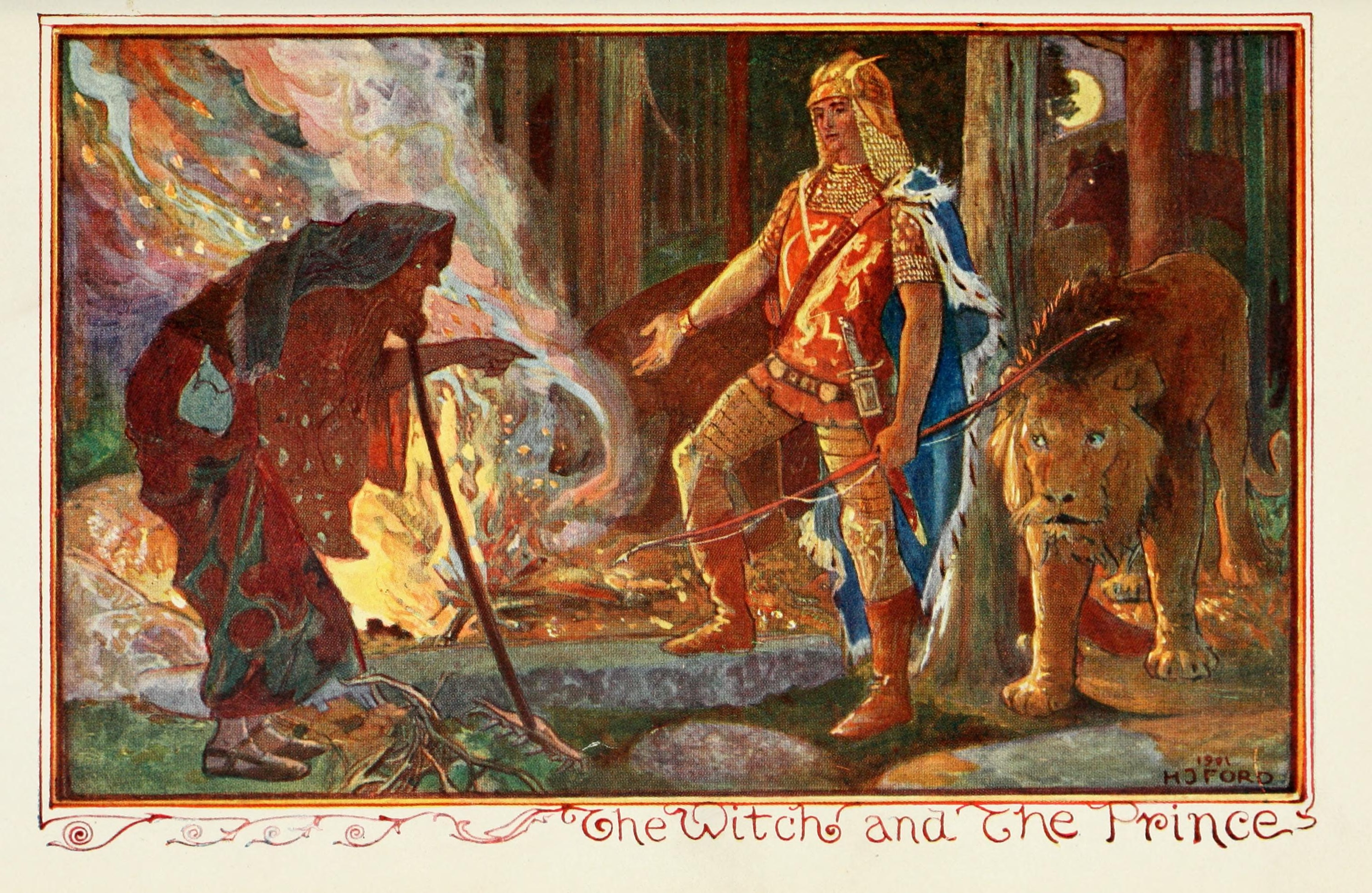
Illustration by Henry Justice Ford from Andrew Lang's Fairy Books

Three princes had a stepsister. The four went hunting one day and were about to shoot a wolf when it offered to give each prince a cub if they spared his life. The same thing happened with a lioness, a fox, a hare, a boar and a bear. Then they came to a crossroads. The oldest prince told his brothers to each mark a birch there: if they returned and saw blood flowing, they would know that that brother was dead, but if milk flowed, he was alive. Then they asked their stepsister which brother she wanted to go with; she chose to go with the oldest.

The oldest prince found a den of robbers. With the aid of his beasts, he killed all but one, who feigned death. He and his stepsister spent the night there. The next day, he went hunting. The surviving robber forced the stepsister to bring him magical potions that healed him, and had her trick her brother into letting her tie his hands behind his back. It was a test of his strength and required three cords. On the third, the robber appeared, brandishing a knife. The prince tricked the robber into letting him blow his horn. The animals came and killed the robber. He chained his stepsister to the wall to let her repent, and put a great bowl before her, telling her he would not see her until she filled it with her tears.

The princess was about to be handed over to a dragon. The oldest prince went to the seashore where she was to be handed over and with his animals killed the dragon. The princess had him come into the coach to drive back to the castle and gave him a ring and half of her handkerchief. But the coachman and footman killed him to claim that they had killed the dragon. The animals gathered around the body. Then the wolf had an idea. It killed an ox and set the fox as a guard over it. It caught a crow, and the lion told it they would not kill it if it got them the waters to revive the prince. It did so, and the prince went to the town. The princess was to marry the coachman, but the prince proved himself the dragon-slayer by the ring and the handkerchief, so the coachman was thrown in prison and the prince married the princess.

One day he went hunting and lost his way. He asked a witch if he might stay the night, but she claimed to fear his animals and asked to touch them with a rod. He agreed, but it turned them, and him, into stone. The youngest brother returned to the crossroads and saw that ill had befallen his oldest brother. He went down that road, and the people of the town took him for their prince. The princess knew he was not her husband and begged him to find the prince. He went, found the same witch, and suffered the same fate.

The second brother returned to the crossroads and saw that ill had befallen both his brothers. He went down the same road as his oldest brother, and again only the princess knew who he was. He went out to search, found the witch, but told her that only he could strike his animals. She gave him the rod, and he touched the fox with it, and he saw it turned it to stone. Then he threatened her with his animals unless she restored his brothers, so she did so and they returned to the town.

== Motifs ==
The betrayal by a female relative is also featured in The Prince and the Princess in the Forest and The Blue Belt, where the treachery comes from his mother. The rescue by the other brother is also common, though it is generally only one other, as in The Enchanted Doe, The Two Brothers, The Gold-Children, and The Knights of the Fish.

== See also ==
- Princess and dragon
- The Three Dogs
- The Bold Knight, the Apples of Youth, and the Water of Life
