= The Two Brothers =

German fairy tale

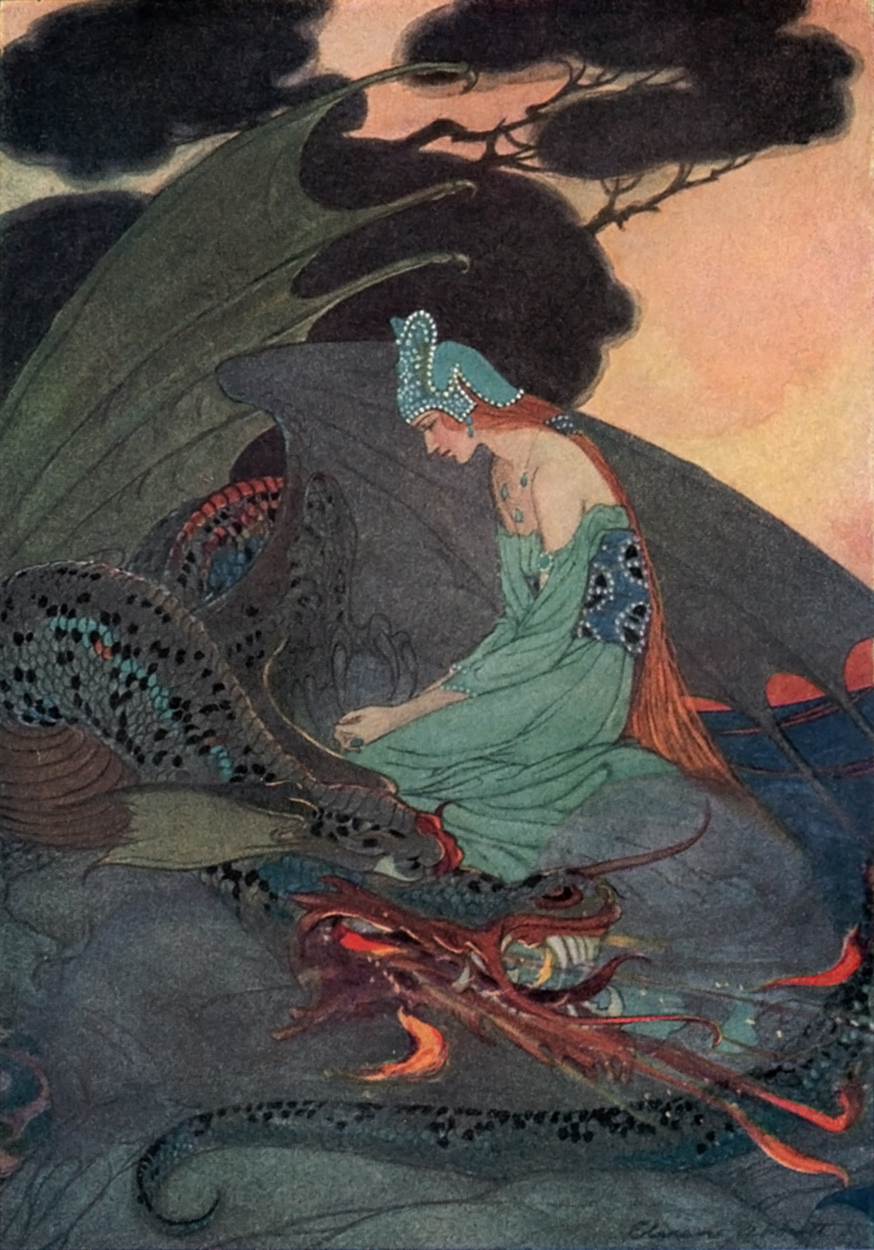
- Illustration by Elenore Abbott

Folk tale
- Name: The Two Brothers
- Aarne–Thompson grouping: ATU 303, ATU 567
- Country: Germany
- Published in: Grimms' Fairy Tales

"The Two Brothers" is a German fairy tale collected by the Brothers Grimm, tale number 60. It is Aarne-Thompson type 303, "The Blood Brothers", with an initial episode of type 567, "The Magic Bird Heart". A similar story, of Sicilian origin, was also collected by author and folklorist Andrew Lang in The Pink Fairy Book.

== Synopsis ==
A rich goldsmith and a poor broommaker were brothers. The broommaker had two identical twin sons. One day, the broommaker found a golden bird's feather in the woods, and sold it to his brother for a great sum. He pursued the bird again and found a golden lamp. A third time, he brought back the bird itself, and his brother, who knew its powers—that whoever ate its heart and liver would find a gold coin beneath his pillow every night—had his wife cook it. But his nephews came to the kitchen to beg, and when they ate scrapes of the bird, the gold coins started appearing under their pillows.

The goldsmith told his brother that his sons were working with the devil, and persuaded him to abandon them. A huntsman took them in and taught them his trade. Once they were grown, they begged his permission to seek their fortune. He was pleased, because they talked like brave huntsmen, and he let them go. He then gave them a knife with directions that if they ever parted, they should stick the knife into a tree, and when either one returned, he could see how his brother was faring because the blade's side would rust if things were going badly for him.

On the way, they nearly shot a hare for hunger, but it begged for its life, offering to give them two young hares instead, so they let it go. The same happened with a fox, a wolf, a bear, and a lion. The young animals showed them a village where they could buy food. The brothers parted ways, each taking half the animals, and drove a knife into a tree where they parted.

The younger came to a town all hung in black, where a dragon had eaten every young maiden except the princess, who was to be given to it the next day. The huntsman climbed the dragon's hill and found three cups and a sword. He was unable to wield the sword until he had drunk from the cups.

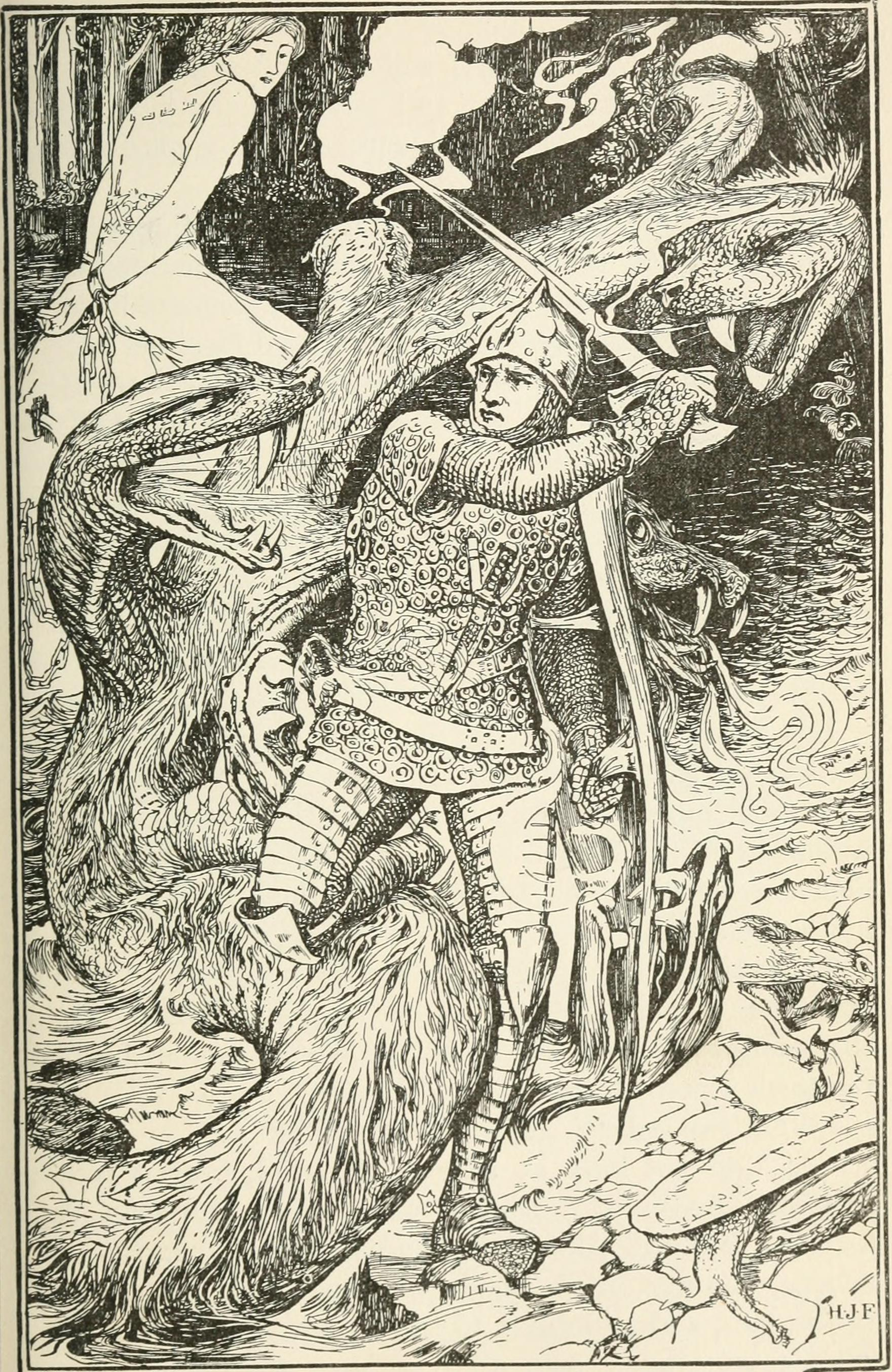
The knight in fierce battle against the Seven-headed serpent. Illustration from Andrew Lang's The Pink Fairy Book.

The next morning, the princess was brought to the hill, and the king's marshal watched. The seven-headed dragon came and breathed fire, setting all the grass ablaze, but the animals trampled the flames out. The huntsman cut off six of its heads and its tail and had the animals tear it to bits. The princess distributed her necklace among the animals, and gave the huntsman her knife, with which he cut off the dragon's tongues. He was exhausted and told the lion to keep watch while he slept, but the lion was also exhausted, and told the bear to keep watch, and so on down to the hare, who had no one to tell to keep watch. The marshal cut off the huntsman's head and forced the princess to promise to say that he had rescued her.

The animals woke and would have killed the hare, but it said it knew of a root that would restore the huntsman, so they let it fetch it. The huntsman thought the princess must have killed him, to be rid of him, and wandered the world. A year later, he came back to the town and found it hung in red for the princess's wedding to the marshal. The huntsman bet with the innkeeper that he could get bread from the king's table, and sent the hare. The princess recognized it by the part of her necklace, and sent a loaf with it. The innkeeper would bet no more, but he sent the fox, wolf, bear, and lion for meat, vegetables, confectionery, and wine.

The king wondered at the animals, and the princess told him to send for their master. When he arrived at the castle, the seven dragon's heads were displayed, and the huntsman opened their mouth and asked where their tongues were. He produced the tongues, and the princess confirmed his story. The marshal was executed, and the huntsman and princess married.

One day, the young king hunted a white stag and ended up alone in the woods. An old woman begged to come near the fire, and asked him to strike his animals with a wand so they would not harm her. This turned them to stone, and so she was able to turn him to stone. The older twin found the knife all rusted on one side, and went in search of his brother. He was welcomed as the young king in the town, but put a sword in the bed between himself and the princess. Hearing what his younger brother had been doing, he set out to the same woods and found the same witch, but refused to strike his animals. When he shot his gun at her, she was invulnerable to lead, but he tore off three silver buttons and shot her again. He made her restore his brother, his brother's animals, and many others.

The brothers went home, telling their tales. On hearing that his older brother had been accepted as him and slept in his bed, the young king cut off his head, but repented of it. The hare brought the root again, and the brother was restored. They returned to the town, and the princess could recognize her husband by the necklace on his animals, and asked him why he had put the sword in the bed that night, revealing to him that his brother had been true.

== Analysis ==
Folktale collectors noted that the tale is of fragmentary origin, pieced together to shape its current form.

The beginning of the tale fits tale type ATU 567, "The Magical Bird-Heart", wherein a bird with magical body parts promises a great destiny for all who eat of him. The tale belongs to a "European version" of the tale type where two brothers eat the bird and go their separate ways, lacking the theft of magical items by an antagonist and their transformation through the use of a herb.

== Adaptations ==
A version of the tale was given by French author Alexandre Dumas with the name Les Deux Frères, greatly resembling Grimm's tale. In this version, the brothers are named Gottlieb and Wilfrid and each of them recruit a lion, a bear, a hare, a wolf and a fox.

== See also ==
- Donkey Cabbages
- Ferdinand the Faithful and Ferdinand the Unfaithful
- Pwyll
- Shortshanks
- The Enchanted Doe
- The Gold-Children
- The Knights of the Fish
- The Queen Bee
- The Three Dogs
- The Three Princes and their Beasts
- The Twins (Albanian tale)
