= The Gold-Children =

German fairy tale

Folk tale
- Name: The Gold-Children
- Aarne–Thompson grouping: ATU 555; ATU 303
- Country: Germany
- Published in: Grimms' Fairy Tales

"The Gold-Children" is a German fairy tale collected by the Brothers Grimm, tale number 85. It is Aarne-Thompson type 555, the fisherman and his wife, followed by type 303, blood brothers.

== Summary ==
A fisherman caught a golden fish, who gave him and his wife a rich castle on the condition that he will not tell anyone how he had gotten it. His wife badgered the knowledge from him, but he caught the fish again and regained the castle, and when she badgered the truth out of him again, he caught the fish a third time. The fish saw it was fated to fall into the fisherman's hand and told him to take it home and cut it into six pieces, giving two to his wife and two to his horse. He had to bury the last two pieces in the ground. When he did, his wife gave birth to twins of gold, the horse gave birth to two foals of gold, and two golden lilies sprouted from the earth.

When they were grown, the gold children left home, telling their father that the lilies would wither if they were ill and die if they were dead. People mocked them because of their golden appearance, and one child went back to his father, but the other went on, through a forest filled with robbers. He covered himself with bearskins to hide the gold from the thieves, and wooed a maiden. They fell in love and soon married. Her father then came home and believed his son-in-law was a beggar because he was covered with bearskins. However, the next morning, he was relieved when he saw the gold skin of the young man who was no longer wearing the skins.

The gold man went out to hunt a stag and asked an old witch about it. The witch told him that she knew of the stag, but her dog barked at him. When he threatened to shoot it, the witch transformed him into stone. Back home, his brother saw that the lily had withered and realized his brother was in trouble. He went to help him, but did not approach the witch closely enough to be transformed. Then he threatened to shoot her if she did not restore his brother. The witch did so, and one brother went back to his bride and the other returned to their father.

== Analysis ==
The Brothers Grimm themselves, in the annotations to their tales, noted the similarity of "The Golden Children" to "The Two Brothers", specially in regards to the miraculous birth of the twins and their later adventures.

== See also ==
- The Enchanted Doe
- The Fisherman and His Wife
- The Knights of the Fish
- The Three Princes and their Beasts
- The Two Brothers
