= The Merchant (fairy tale) =

Italian literary fairy tale

The Merchant is an Italian literary fairy tale written by Giambattista Basile in his 1634 work, the Pentamerone.

== Synopsis ==
A merchant's son, Cienzo, was throwing stones with the son of the king of Naples, and cracked the prince's head. His father, fearing the consequences, threw him out with some money, an enchanted horse, and an enchanted dog. In the evening, Cienzo found a tower by a ruined house; the master of the tower would not let him in, for fear of robbers. Cienzo went to the house. In the night, he found it was haunted by three ghosts, lamenting their treasure. He lamented with them. In the morning, they gave it to him and warned him to keep care of it. He could not see a ladder up and called for help; the owner of the house came with a ladder and they found a treasure, which Cienzo refused to take part of and went on. Another time, he crossed a river to find a fairy being attacked by robbers; he helped her, but refused to come to her palace to be rewarded.

He came to a town where a seven-headed dragon devoured a maiden every day, and now the lot had fallen the princess, Menechella. He went to fight the dragon, found its heads reattached themselves, but cut them all off with one blow, cut off their tongues, and threw them about the countryside, where they were too far apart.

The king declared that whoever had killed the dragon would marry his daughter. A countryman gathered all the heads and claimed the prize. Cienzo wrote a letter to the princess and had his dog deliver it. The king had the dog followed back to Cienzo, who revealed that the heads that the man had brought as proof were missing the tongues, which he had. The king married his daughter to Cienzo and sent for Cienzo's father.

== See also ==
- The Three Dogs
- The Sea-Maiden
