= Povestea cu măr moramăr și păsărica a ciută =

Romanian fairy tale

Povestea cu măr moramăr și păsărica a ciută (English: "The tale of the moramar apples and the little bird") is a Romanian fairy tale published as part of the collection Povești nemuritoare.

The tale contains similarities to two types in the international Aarne-Thompson-Uther Index: ATU 550, "Bird, Horse and Princess", and ATU 551, "The Water of Life".

== Summary ==
A king who has three sons and is losing his eyesight has a vision in a dream that says that only the titular moramar apples and the little bird can restore his sight. So, his sons offer to go on a quest for the objects. Each of the three princes takes a fine horse, sets out on a journey, and separately meets an old woman begging for alms. The eldest and middle princes refuse her plights, and she curses them, that his quest will fail. Each then tries to cross a narrow bridge and falls into the water below, after which a fox turns each of them into a stone pillar. When it is the youngest's turn, he gives some coins to the old woman, and confides in her about the dangerous quest ahead of him. The old woman gives him a crutch and a needle, and advises him to use the objects before he crosses the stream. He does as instructed, and a beautiful bridge opens for him. On the other side of the stream, the fox appears and promises to help. With the fox's help, the prince takes part in a chain of quests: to get the moramar apples and the little bird he must procure a 24-legged horse with 12 heads from the kites (birds of prey), who order him to bring them the princess Ileana Cosinzeana in order to have the horse.

The prince tries to cross the water to reach Ileana's abode, and is attacked by a "tall person" when he tries to cross. The fox grabs the tall man from behind and forces him to become their new servant. Finally, the prince arrives at a beautiful garden, where Ileana sleeps with her twelve fairy handmaidens, and two flowers under her head. The prince tries to take the princess, but accidentally wakes her up. She is told the whole story, and agrees to join the prince, but asks him to get a letter from her brother, Măr Rotat, in the underworld. The prince asks how he can reach the other world, and the fox says he has to ask the fierarul pămîntului (World Blacksmith) to shod his horse's shoes with iron and steel; then the prince should climb down a well. He descends the well and discovers that Măr has died at the hands of a witch during a hunt. Following Măr's loyal hounds' advice, he retrieves Măr's eyes and heart and resurrects him. In gratitude, Măr gives the prince a letter, but the prince still has to come out of the underworld.

The prince finds a snake threatening a nest of eaglets, and kills it. The eagle mother appears and offers to take him out of the other world, by having the prince feed the bird meat, bread, and water on the journey upwards to the surface world. The prince gathers cartloads of bread, cows, and barrels full of wine, mounts on the eagle, and begins his flight back to the surface. Near the surface, the eagle asks for a last feeding, but the food is gone. So, the prince cuts off pieces of flesh from his own body to feed the eagle one last time, and they complete the journey. After the eagle lands on the surface world, it heals the prince.

Finally, back home, the prince delivers Măr's letter to his sister, who reads the contents and decides to join the prince in getting to the kingdom where the multi-headed, multi-legged horse is held. Once there, the fox asks the prince what his decision is: to have the princess or the horse, to which the price replies he wants to have both. Upon hearing this, the fox turns into the princess to trick the kites, and allows the prince to fetch the horse for himself. In the shape of the princess, the fox tells the kites she will take a short leave, and ties a string around her foot to satisfy the kites. The fox then assumes its real form and meets with the prince and Ileana.

This repeats with the next kingdom: the prince decides to have the horse, the moramar tree, and the bird for himself. So, the fox turns into the horse and is delivered to the kites. Later that day, when it is put in the stables, the fox-as-horse darts off and goes to meet the prince, the princess, and their servant. Finally, the group reaches the fox's house, and the animal points to two stone pillars, the prince's brothers, and asks the prince if it should restore them to life. He chooses to have them restored. The fox respects his decision, and turns them back into humans. The prince's brothers depart for their kingdom, while the prince rests with the fox in its hut for three days.

After three days, the prince rides back to his father's kingdom and stops to sleep by a well. Suddenly, his brothers kill him, cut up his body, throw it in the well and cover it with soil. Then, they force Ileana to keep quiet about it, lest she shares the prince's fate. They take the bird, the tree and the horse with them to the kingdom. However, the moramar tree and the bird do not cure the king.

The fox rushes to the well and notices the grass on the well is red, marking the prince's grave. The fox digs up his corpse, douses him with the water of death to restore his body, then the water of life to revive him. After the prince wakes up, the fox admonishes him for choosing to revive his brothers, gives him a magic cloak, and departs. The prince goes back to his kingdom and finds some work with a blacksmith.

Some time later, Ileana has a dream about a golden distaff with a golden spindle that spins by itself. The blacksmith is ordered to make one, but the prince asks to do it. He swishes the cloak the fox gave him and creates the golden distaff, then goes to the castle's garden and takes it out. Ileana sees the object from her window and smiles, the bird begins to sing, and the moramar tree shakes a bit. The next day, she says that she wants another object she saw in a dream: a golden reel to spin thread with a golden spool that gyrates by itself. The prince fashions the second object with the magic cloak and goes to the castle to show it by Ileana's window. Her smile grows even larger, and the tree's and the bird's reactions become more intense.

Lastly, on the third day, Ileana says she wants a golden hen, with chicks that chirp, to be made. Once again, the prince produces the golden object by waving the fox's cloak, then goes to show it to Ileana. The princess is overjoyed, and so are the other objects he procured during his quest: the horse neighs in response to its master, the bird sings, and the moramar tree dances. The prince goes to talk to his father about his brothers' deception, and is asked about how to deal with them. The prince proposes that a large shirt should be made, large enough to fit the three brothers; then they are to throw spears into the air. If a prince is guilty, his spear will kill him when it falls. The king agrees. The three brothers throw their spears in the air; the youngest prince's falls at his feet, while his brothers' fall squarely on them, killing them. After having punished his traitorous brothers, the prince marries Ileana, and succeeds his father as king.

== Analysis ==
=== Tale type ===
The tale contains similarities to two tale types listed in the international Aarne-Thompson-Uther Index: ATU 550, "Bird, Horse and Princess", and ATU 551, "The Water of Life". Scholars Stith Thompson and Hans-Jörg Uther remarked on the similarities between these plots and the likeness of their motifs, which make it difficult to index this tale as either one type or the other.

In tale type ATU 550, "Bird, Horse and Princess" (previously, "Quest for the Golden Bird"), a king requests the bird as it is the only thing that can cure him, so he sends his three sons on a quest for the bird. The two elder sons fail, being turned to stone or distracted partway through their journey, and only the youngest prince perseveres. Eventually, he finds the bird, but must complete further quests (usually for a horse and a princess). After the quests, he returns to save his brothers, who betray him and take the princess, the bird, and the horse for themselves. At the end, the young prince is saved by his animal helper and returns to the kingdom to unmask his traitorous brothers.

In tale type ATU 551, "The Water of Life", the king is going blind and asks his three sons to fetch him a remedy. Eventually, the youngest son finds the remedy in the possession of a princess in a distant kingdom. He then steals the remedy and goes home, only to be betrayed by his elder brothers. Meanwhile, the princess discovers that someone stole her possession and goes after the thief.

=== Motifs ===
==== The animal helper ====
In both tale types, the hero (the youngest prince) is helped by an animal, which can be a fox or a wolf. The animal companion gives advice to the hero, encourages him to continue on the quest, and even revives him after his brothers betray and kill him.

==== The quest for the bird ====
Sometimes, the king or the hero's father send the hero on his quest for the bird to cure him of his illness or blindness, instead of finding out who has been destroying his garden and/or stealing his precious golden apples.

In many variants, the reason for the quest is to bring the bird to decorate a newly built church, temple or mosque, as per the suggestion of a passing beggar or hermit that informed the king of its existence. Professors Michael Meraklis and Richard MacGillivray Dawkins remarked that this is the reason for the quest in Greek variants of the tale type. In addition, Swedish scholar Waldemar Liungman located this form of the story around the Black Sea and in Greece.

== Variants ==
According to Romanian scholar Adolf Schullerus's index of Romanian folktales, published in 1918, type 550 registered 13 variants in Romanian sources, while type 551 recorded 2 texts until then.

=== Romania ===
In a tale translated to English as Boy-Beautiful, the Golden Apples, and the Were-Wolf, the sons of the emperor investigate who has been eating the emperor's prized apples, and the youngest prince (possibly Făt-Frumos) finds two shining golden feathers in the foliage. The prince then quests for the golden bird, the white saddle-horse with golden-bridle of another Emperor, and the golden-haired "divine Craiessa" ("queen").

In the Romanian tale Povestea lupului năsdrăvan şi a Ilenei Cosinzene ("Tale of the Enchanted Wolf and Ileana Consinzeana"), a wolf helps the prince in his quest for the feather of a golden dove, a golden apple, a horse, and the legendary princess Ileana Cosânzeana. When the king's other sons kill the prince, the apple wilts, the dove becomes a black raven, and the horse and the princess vanish into the sky.

In a tale titled The Wonderful Bird (Romanian: Pasărea măiastră), the king sends his sons to find a bird to decorate a newly built church. His elder sons return with the bird and a poultry maid. The bird does not sing, and the maid seems to be despondent. The youngest prince returns secretly to his father's kingdom and tells his story. The bird begins to sing when the prince enters the church, recognizing its master.

In the tale Der Vogel des Paradieses ("The Bird of Paradise"), collected by Romanian ethnologist Pauline Schullerus from Harbachtal, the king wants to find the Bird of Paradise to become young again. An old man (implied by the narrative to be God himself) helps the king's youngest son, and both quest for the Bird of Paradise, the horse of "Negru Dovedit", the saber of the Red King, and the daughter of the Green King.

In a variant from Bukovina translated into German as Der närrische Prinz ("The Foolish Prince"), a king has three sons: the elder two smart, but the third one considered a fool. He also has in his garden a tree that yields golden apples, which are stolen overnight by a mysterious thief. The three princes offer to keep watch over the tree at night, but the elder two fail and the third discovers the true culprit: a bird with golden feathers and golden talons. He captures the bird and presents it to the king the next morning, but lets it escape, save for some feathers. The king then orders the three princes to get him the bird. The youngest prince begins his quest by finding an injured wolf and giving it a piece of meat. After the animal regains his strength, it aids the prince in a chain of quests: for the golden bird, a golden horse ("goldenes pferde"), and for the princess that lives in the land where the Sun first shines.

Romanian historian Nicolae Iorga translated a Romanian tale into French as Le fils cadet de l'empereur ("The Emperor's Youngest Son"). In this tale, an emperor has three sons, the elder two proud and arrogant, while the youngest is the bravest. The monarch also has a beautiful garden wherein grows a tree that produces golden blooms and golden fruits. One day, the golden fruits begin disappearing, and the emperor orders his three sons to guard it at night. The elder two fail, but the youngest discovers the culprit: a bird with golden plumes. With the help of a talking wolf, the youngest prince gets the bird with golden plumage from the emperor of birds, as well as an enchanted horse from another emperor, and the beautiful daughter of a prince that is kept away from people's eyes.

In a Romanian tale collected in 1986, from teller Virgil Bornescu, in the village of Nifon, Tulcea, with the title Cucul-de-Aur ("The Golden Cuckoo"), an emperor builds a church entirely of gold, and sends for the kingdom's craftsmen to see if there is anything missing in his project. The craftsmen indicate there is nothing missing, but an old priest says it lacks the Golden Cuckoo. The emperor then sends his three sons to find the bird: Saint Peter and God disguise Themselves as old men and ask the elder princes for food, but they answer the strangers scornfully and are turned to stone, while the youngest pays the debts of a dead man and is helped by a wolf in the quest for the Golden Cuckoo, the Golden Horse guarded by the zmeis of the Golden Kingdom, the Silver Horse owned by the zmeis of the Silver Kingdom, the Copper Horse from the zmeis of the Copper Country, and for Ileana Cosânzeana.

=== Moldova ===
In a Moldavian tale published by author and folklorist Grigore Botezatu with the title Break-of-Day, an emperor has no children but is told that his empress is to walk an untrod path in the woods, where the dew is untouched. The empress becomes pregnant and gives birth to a boy named Break-of-Day. He grows up very quickly. After an argument with his father, he climbs a very tall tree for twelve years to get the fruits at the top. He picks three golden apples, but a white bird with a golden tail eats two of them. Break-of-Day keeps the last apple with him and plucks a feather from the white bird, then climbs down the tall tree for another seven years. He shows his father the only apple he saved and declares he will pursue the white bird. Break-of-Day goes on a journey and meets a "thick-lipped" man named Black Arab, who possesses magic powers. The Black Arab tells Break-of-Day about the golden-tailed white bird: it is an enchanted maiden that the Devil keeps in a cradle. Break-of-Day tries to steal the maiden from the cradle, but the Devil catches him. The Devil promises him the maiden, but Break-of-Day must first get the Devil's horses from his brother in the underworld. Break-of-Day and the Black Arab then take part in a series of quests: to get the Devil's horses from the Tartar, prince of the netherworld, and to find the maiden Ilyana Kosinzyana to be the Tartar's wife. At the end of the tale, they release Ilyana Kosinzyana from the Tartar's grasp and disenchant the golden-tailed white bird by killing the Devil.

== See also ==
- Leaves of Pearls
- The Bird 'Grip'
- The Golden Bird
- The Greek Princess and the Young Gardener
- Tsarevitch Ivan, the Firebird and the Gray Wolf
- How Ian Direach got the Blue Falcon
- The Nunda, Eater of People
- The Water of Life (German fairy tale)
