= L'Upupa und der Triumph der Sohnesliebe =

Opera by Hans Werner Henze

- Opera by Hans Werner Henze
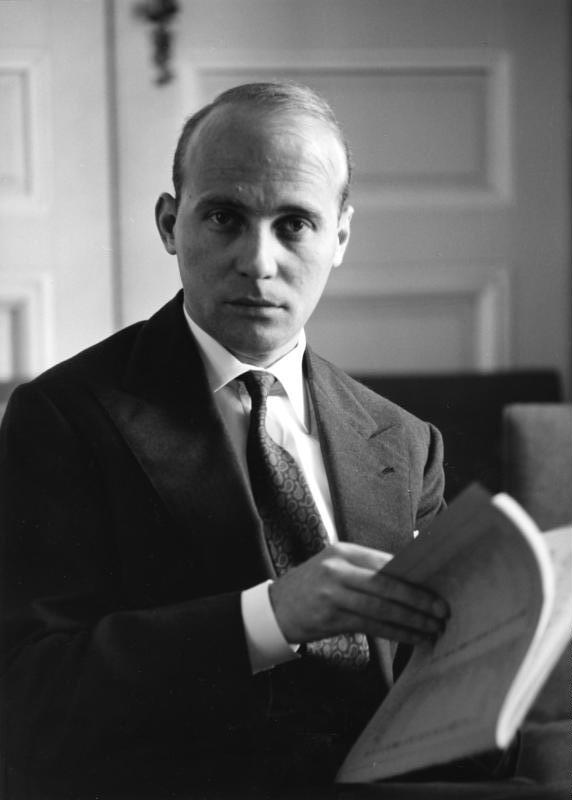
- The opera's composer, 1960
- Translation: The Hoopoe and the Triumph of Filial Love
- Librettist: Hans Werner Henze
- Language: German
- Premiere: 12 August 2003; Salzburg Festival by Deutsche Oper Berlin and Teatro Real

L'Upupa und der Triumph der Sohnesliebe (English: The Hoopoe and the Triumph of Filial Love) is an opera by Hans Werner Henze with a German libretto by the composer, inspired by Arab and Persian legends. This is Henze's 15th, and self-stated final, opera, and the first where he has written his own libretto.

The opera was first performed at the Salzburg Festival on 12 August 2003 in a co-production with the Deutsche Oper Berlin and the Teatro Real, Madrid, staged by Dieter Dorn, set by Jürgen Rose. For the premiere, the originally scheduled conductor was Christian Thielemann and the original singer scheduled as "The demon" was Ian Bostridge, but in their places, Markus Stenz conducted and John Mark Ainsley sang "The demon".

Critics have noted stylistic allusions to the music of Alban Berg and Igor Stravinsky, as well as to the operas Die Entführung aus dem Serail, The Magic Flute, Die Frau ohne Schatten, Tristan und Isolde and Parsifal.

== Roles ==
| Role | Voice type | Premiere Cast, 12 August 2003 (Conductor: Markus Stenz) |
|---|---|---|
| Badi'aet el-Hosn wal Dschamal, a Jewish girl | soprano | Laura Aikin |
| The demon | tenor | John Mark Ainsley |
| Al Radshi (the old man known as the ‘Eccentric Widower’) Grand Vizier of Manda, the Island of the Black Baboons | baritone | Alfred Muff |
| Malik, the ancient Sultan of Pati | mezzo-soprano | Hanna Schwarz |
| Dijab, the old tyrant of Kipungani | bass | Günther Missenhardt |
| Al Kasim (‘the Sharer’), Al Radshi’s youngest son | baritone | Matthias Goerne |
| Adschib (‘the Wayward’), another son, a good-for-nothing | countertenor | Axel Köhler |
| Gharib (‘the Untrustworthy’), another son, a sly fox | bass | Anton Scharinger |
Gardeners, flowers, guards, Nubian soldiers, henchmen and three gnomes

The role of "the nameless dictator" is unseen and unheard.

== Synopsis ==
Al Radshi, an old man, who lives in a tower on Manda, the island of the black baboons, laments the absence of his golden bird, a hoopoe that used to visit him daily. Al Radshi once reached out to touch the hoopoe, which caused it to fly away. Since then, the bird has not been seen. Al Radshi asks his three sons to go off on a quest to find the hoopoe and return it to him. Two of the sons are untrustworthy and lazy, but the third, Al Kasim, is honest and brave. Al Kasim is the only son to go off in search of the hoopoe.

Al Kasim does find the hoopoe, with the help of a demon, who is a fallen angel with tattered black wings and who has been barred from heaven for an unidentified crime. Al Kasim then has to find and rescue a captive princess, Badi'eat el-Hosn. He does so, and falls in love with her. His next quest is to find a magic chest.

After Al Kasim has obtained these three treasures, the other two brothers reappear and push Kasim and Badi'aet el-Hosn down a well. Those two brothers return to their father and claim credit for performing Al Kasim's acts. However, Al Kasim and Badi'aet el-Hosn are eventually rescued. The other two brothers are expelled from the island. Al Kasim cannot marry Badi'aet el-Hosn, however, until he completes one more quest. The opera leaves unresolved the question of whether Al Kasim and Badi'aet el-Hosn are united at the end.

== Review ==
The reviewer of The Times stated: "The hot ticket at this year’s Salzburg Festival is not one of the three Mozart opera productions, but the world premiere production of Hans Werner Henze’s newest stage-work L’Upupa und der Triumph der Sohnesliebe (The Hoopoe and the Triumph of Filial Love)." and continued: "This action-packed scenario might seem complex, but it emerges in a production of magical simplicity and ravishing visual beauty by the stage director, Dieter Dorn and set and costume designer, Jürgen Rose with a spell-binding clarity. A clarity which Henze also achieves in what must be his richest and most entrancing opera score to date."

== Recording ==
There is a DVD of the original 2003 Salzburg production with Matthias Goerne, Laura Aikin, John Mark Ainsley, Alfred Muff, and Markus Stenz conducting the Vienna Philharmonic Orchestra and the Vienna State Opera Chorus (EuroArts 2053929).

== See also ==
- The Golden Bird (German fairy tale)
- The Bird 'Grip' (Swedish fairy tale)
- The Greek Princess and the Young Gardener (Irish fairy tale)
- Tsarevitch Ivan, the Firebird and the Gray Wolf (Russian fairy tale)
- How Ian Direach got the Blue Falcon (Scottish fairy tale)
- The Little Green Frog (French literary tale)
