= Laughing Eye and Weeping Eye =

Serbian fairy tale

Laughing Eye and Weeping Eye or The Lame Fox is a Serbian fairy tale collected by Albert H. Wratislaw in his Sixty Folk-Tales from Exclusively Slavonic Sources, number 40. Andrew Lang included it in The Grey Fairy Book. Parker Fillmore included the tale as The Little Lame Fox in his book Jugoslav Fairy Tales.

== Synopsis ==
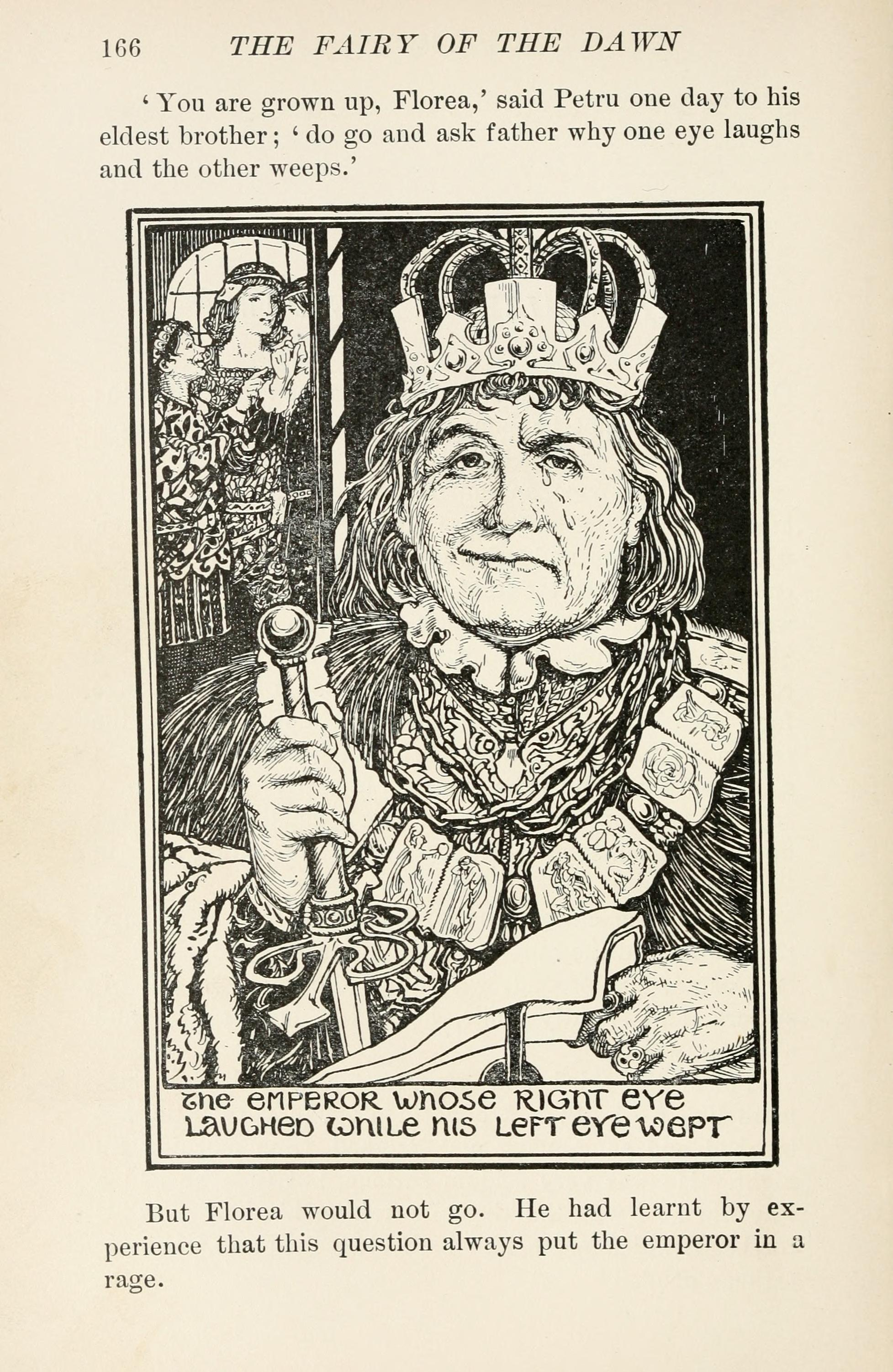
Illustration by Henry Justice Ford for Andrew Lang's The Violet Fairy Book (1901).

A man once always had one eye weeping and the other smiling. He had three sons, of whom the youngest was rather foolish. One day, out of curiosity, the sons each asked why one eye was weeping and the other smiling. The father went into a rage, which frightened off the older two but not the youngest. So the father told the youngest that his right eye smiled because he was glad to have a son like him, but his left eye wept because he once had a marvelous vine in his garden, and it had been stolen.

All three sons set out to find it, but the youngest parted with his older brothers at a crossroads. A lame fox came up to the older brothers to beg bread, and they drove it off with sticks; it went to the younger, and he fed it. It told him how to find the vine, and to dig it up with a wooden shovel rather than an iron one. He thought the wooden shovel would not be strong enough, but the noise the iron shovel made woke the guards.

His captors told him he could have the vine if he brought them a golden apple. He went back to meet the fox, who told him where it was, and to use the wooden rather than the golden pole to get it, but he used the golden pole, which woke the guards. They told him he had to bring them a horse that could circle the world in a day. The fox told him where to find it, and to use the hempen halter rather than the golden one. He failed again, and his new captor told him he could be free if he brought him a golden maiden who never saw the sun or moon. He persuaded the man to lend him to the horse to help find her.

The fox led him to a cave where he found such a maiden. He brought her out and to his horse. The fox said it was a pity he had to exchange her, and turned himself into a replica of her. The youngest son got back his father's vine and married the real golden maiden as well.

== Translations ==
Karel Jaromír Erben, in a collection of Slavic fairy tales, translated the tale as Chromá liška ("The Limping Fox"), and sourced it from Serbia.

French Slavicist Louis Léger translated the tale as L’œil qui pleure et l’œil qui rit, ou le renard boiteux ("The Eye that Cries and the Eye that Laughs, or The Limping Fox").

Serbian translator Nada Ćurčija Prodanović published the tale as The King's Vine, in her collection of Yugoslav folktales. Her version keeps the prince's quest for the king's vine, a golden apple, and a golden girl.

== Analysis ==
=== Tale type ===
This tale shows similarities with Aarne-Thompson-Uther Index tale type ATU 550, "Bird, Horse and Princess", more famously represented by German fairy tale The Golden Bird.

The tale also shares a similar motif that appears in both ATU 550 and ATU 551, "The Water of Life": the king whose eyes both laugh and cry at the same time. This entices his son's curiosity and it is what motivates the quest for the object that can appease the king's sorrow.

=== Motifs ===
The motif of the crying king appears as an independent tale in the Hungarian Folktale Catalogue, under typing MNK 463**, "A síró-nevető szemű király". According to Hungarian folklorist Katalin Benedek (hu), research shows that the motif appears frequently as the introduction of tale type ATU 551, "The Water of Life" (or "Sons on a Quest for a Wonderful remedy for their father"). The motif may also introduce type ATU 550, "Bird, Horse and Princess" (or "The Golden Bird"), and Hungarian tales of type ATU 301, "Prince Mirkó".

== Variants ==
In a Hungarian tale, A csodás szőlőtő ("The Wonderful Grapevine"), three princes ask their father, the king, why one of his eyes laughs while the other cries. This prompts a quest for the king's lost grapevine and, later, for a horse and a princess.

== See also ==
- How Ian Direach got the Blue Falcon
- The Bird 'Grip'
- The Fairy Aurora
- The Golden Bird
- The Little Green Frog
- Tsarevitch Ivan, the Fire Bird and the Gray Wolf
