= Grateful dead (folklore) =

Motif and a group of related folktales

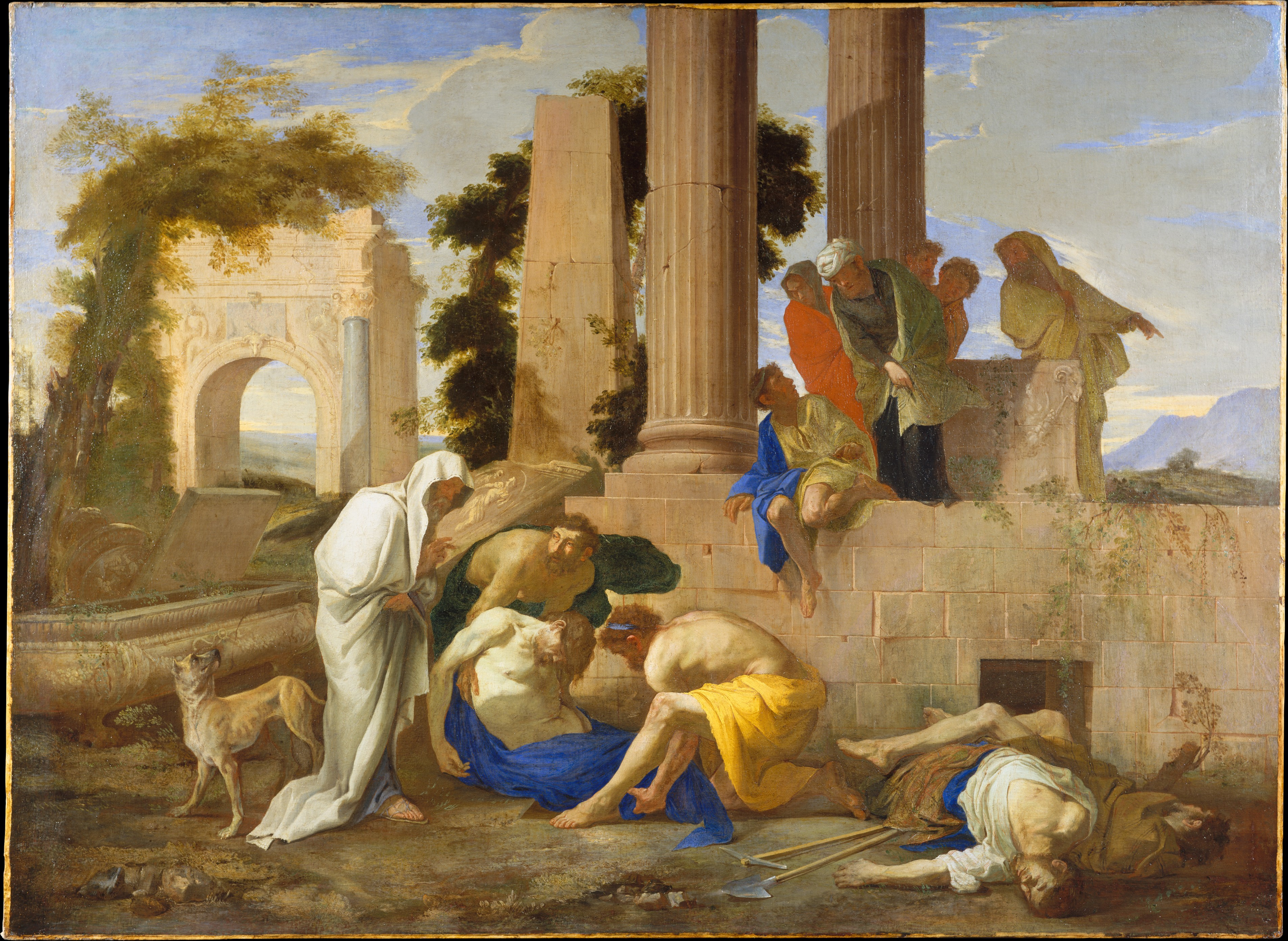
Tobit Burying the Dead by Andrea di Leone. Book of Tobit is considered an early presence of the motif in literature. This connection is disputed by C.F. Devine, however, “since it does not pre-date Christian times there can be no question of relationship…unless, it is a pure distortion of Tobias.”

Grateful dead (or grateful ghost) is both a motif and a group of related folktales present in many cultures throughout the world.

The most common story involves a traveler who encounters a corpse of someone who never received a proper burial, typically stemming from an unpaid debt. The traveler then either pays off the dead person's debt or pays for burial. The traveler is later rewarded or has his life saved by a person or animal who is actually the soul of the dead person; the grateful dead is a form of the donor. The grateful dead spirit may take many different physical forms including that of a guardian angel, animal, or fellow traveler. The traveler's encounter with the deceased comes near the end of the traveler's journey.

== Classification ==
The "grateful dead" story is Aarne–Thompson–Uther type 505.

Folkloristic scholarship classifies ATU types 505–508 under the umbrella term the Grateful Dead, each subtype referring to a certain aspect of the legend:

=== ATU 505: Grateful Dead ===
As described by Stith Thompson, all tale types begin when the hero pays the creditors of a dead man, and later he meets a man in his travels who agrees to help him, as long as they divide in half whatever reward they may gain.

German folklorist Hans-Jörg Uther, in his 2004 revision of the Aarne–Thompson system, subsumed types 506, 506A, 506B, 506** and 508 under only one type, ATU 505, "The Grateful Dead".

=== AaTh 506: The Rescued Princess ===
Thompson divided this type into two categories: 506A, "The Princess Rescued from Slavery", and 506B, "The Princess Rescued from Robbers". Both subtypes were essentially the same: the princess is saved from whatever peril she was in; her saviour (the true hero) is thrown overboard and left to die in the ocean; the grateful dead rescues the hero and takes him to the princess's kingdom, where he uses a ring as his token of recognition, and the grateful dead suggests they divide the reward (even the princess herself). The main difference between both stories is that in subtype 506A, the princess is rescued from slavery, while in 506B, she is saved from a den of robbers.

In French academia, the archetype of the Grateful Dead is known as Jean de Calais, which is also the French name for type 506A. The name refers to a literary tale, Histoire de Jean de Calais, penned in 1723 by Mme. de Gomez.

A related subtype to this cycle is AaTh 506**, wherein the grateful dead character is a saint whose image was preserved by the hero.

=== ATU 507: The Monster's Bride ===
This type may also be known as "The Poisoned Maiden" or "The Dangerous Bride" (the killer monster in the nuptial chamber). In this tale type, the hero is helped by a mysterious stranger in wooing a maiden whose suitors/bridegrooms have died in mysterious circumstances in her bedchamber, and the exorcising of the evil spirits that possessed her.

Swedish folklorist Sven Liljeblad, in his work about the tale type, tabulated two forms of the narrative: a type dubbed Asmodeus, wherein a dragon or serpent attacks the couple on the wedding night, and another named The Snake Maiden, wherein the snakes come out of the maiden's mouth.

Folklorist Stith Thompson recognized three subtypes of ATU 507: 507A, "The Monster's Bride", wherein the princess possesses magical powers given by a monster; 507B, "The Monster in the Bridal Chamber", wherein a serpent or dragon enters the chamber to kill the bridegroom; and 507C, "The Serpent Maiden", wherein the monster (snakes) comes out of the maiden's mouth (although he thought that 507C was only a variation of subtype 507B). Canadian folklorist Carmen Roy considered that type 507A was the "Scandinavian and Irish" form of "The Grateful Dead".

In his own revision of the folktale index, German folklorist Hans-Jörg Uther subsumed previous subtypes 507A, 507B and 507C under one type, ATU 507, "The Monster's Bride".

=== AaTh 508: The Bride Won in a Tournament ===
In this tale type, the grateful dead furnishes the hero with horses and weapons to win a bride as prize for the tournament and later suggests they divide the winnings (including the princess) between them.

== Analysis ==
In many cultures there is the belief that when a person dies their soul is separated from their body thus giving someone a proper burial allows their spirit to carry on into the next life.

An ancient Egyptian text explains the principle of reciprocity in which the deceased calls for a blessing on the person who remembers his name and helps him into a happy afterlife:

But if there be a man, any one whomsoever, who beholdeth this writing and causeth my soul and my name to become established among those who are blessed, let it be done for him likewise after his final arriving (at the end of life's voyage) in recompense for what was done by him for me, Osiris.

=== In ancient literature ===
Scholarship also recognizes the presence of the motif in the biblical Book of Tobit. According to professor Dov Noy, the biblical story is the first register of the tale type in Hebrew literature.

=== In medieval literature ===
According to Jurjen van der Kooi and Don Beecher, the theme of "the grateful dead" was developed in medieval times as courtly epics and chivalric romances.

Stith Thompson pointed out that the type AT 508, "The Bride Won in a Tournament", harked back to medieval chivalry literature: in the 12th century, in a French romance, an Italian novella and a German poem; in the 13th century, in an English romance and in a Swedish prose tale. Hans-Jörg Uther also lists medieval novel Rittertreue, from the 13th century, as another occurrence of the same narrative (see above).

Hispanist Ralph Steele Boggs listed occurrences of the AT 505 in the Spanish literature of Late Middle Ages, and stated that the motif is also present in the 16th-century play The Old Wives' Tale, by George Peele.

The chivalric romance Amadas has the title knight pay his last coins for such a burial. Due to his chivalry the deceased is resurrected and aids the hero in recovering the riches that was used to provide him with a proper burial.

In the Italian tale La novella di Messer Dianese e di Messer Gigliotto, the knight, having spent his property, is given gifts by his friends, so that he may participate in a tournament that will give him the chance to become rich again. After selling the gifts for the burial, he meets the dead in the form of a rich merchant who offers to become his sponsor in the tournament in exchange for a share of the rewards. This follows the aforementioned variant AaTh 508, except that the division turns out to be a divide and choose deal between the wife and the riches won, with the knight choosing the wife.

Spanish scholarship also argues that the theme was explored by Spanish author Lope de Vega in his play Don Juan de Castro.

=== In folk and fairy tales ===
Folklorist Ralph Steele Boggs (de) stated that the story is widespread in Europe, Asia, Africa and America.

The Grateful Dead motif also appears in various fairy tales as a type of donor, such as the Italian Fair Brow, French Princess Marcassa and the Dreadaine Bird (a variant of The Golden Bird); the Swedish The Bird 'Grip'; H. C. Andersen's The Traveling Companion (Reisekamaraten), Danish folktales Den hvide Mand og Kongesønnen ("The white man and the king's son") and The Three Pennies or Norwegian The Companion.

The English tale of Jack the Giant Killer contains the subtype AT 507, "The Monster's Bride".

Scholar George Stephens, in his edition of Medieval romance Amadace, listed other occurrences of the grateful dead in tales from Europe and Asia, as introduction to the book.

In an Irish fairy tale from County Donegal, The Snow, the Crow, and the Blood, a grateful dead, in the form of a short red man, helps a prince against three giants and exorcizes the devil's thrall on a princess.
