= Laura Aikin =

American operatic coloratura soprano (born 1964)

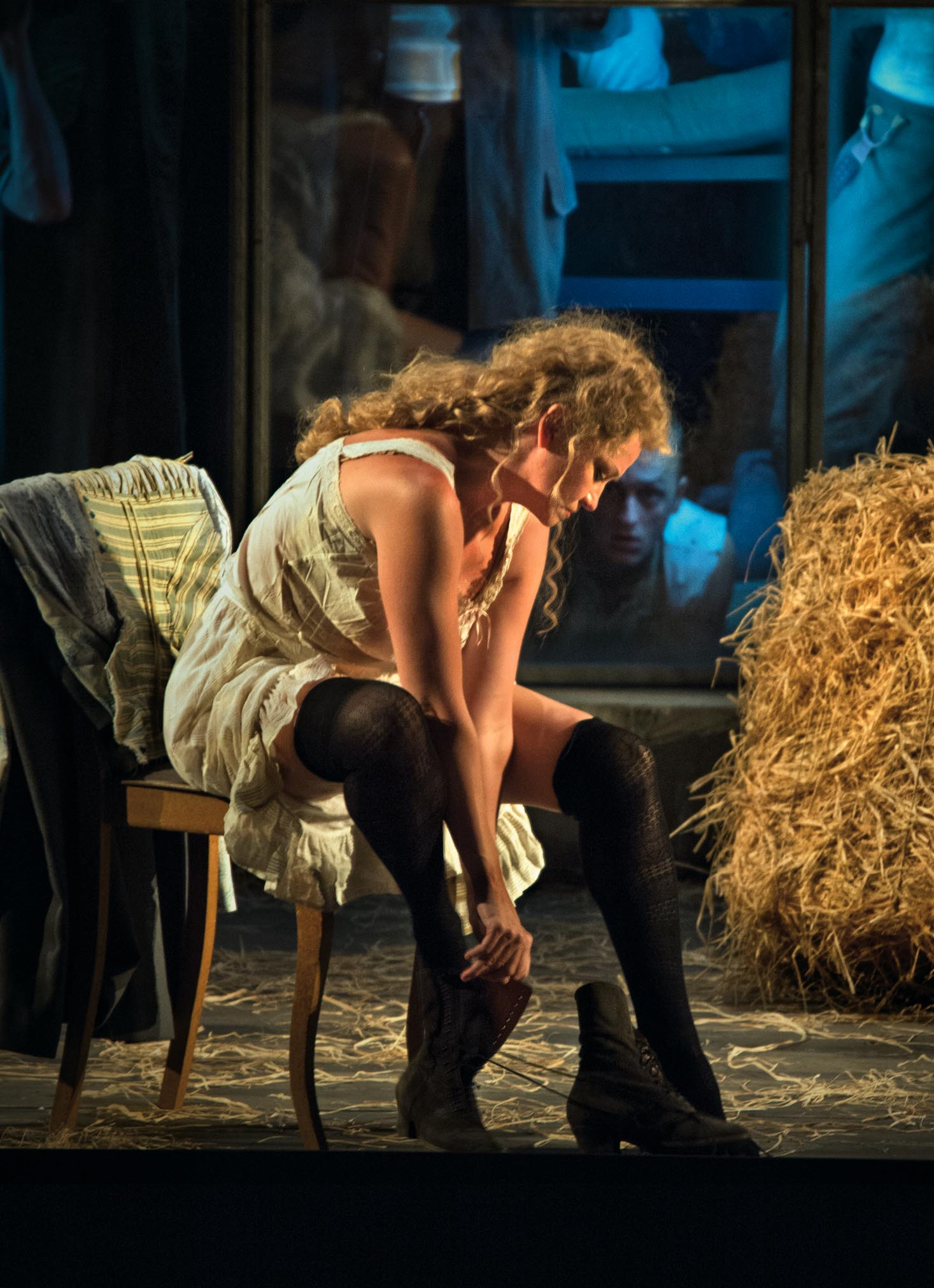
- Aikin as Marie in Zimmermann's Die Soldaten at the 2012 Salzburg Festival
- Born: June 20, 1964 (age 62); Buffalo, New York, U.S.
- Education: University at Buffalo; Indiana University; Hochschule für Musik und Theater München
- Occupation: Operatic coloratura soprano
- Organizations: Staatsoper Unter den Linden

Laura Aikin (born June 20, 1964) is an American operatic coloratura soprano. She is noted for her portrayal of the title character in Lulu, which has received very positive reviews in the press. She has also appeared as Mozart's Queen of the Night, Zerbinetta by Richard Strauss and in contemporary opera at international opera houses and festivals.

== Life ==
Born in Buffalo, New York, Aikin is the daughter of a metal worker and a housewife, growing up together with four sisters in modest circumstances. At the age of 15 she experienced an opera on stage for the first time. She first studied art at the State University of New York in Buffalo, and then music at Indiana University Bloomington, as well as on a German Academic Exchange Service scholarship with Reri Grist at the Hochschule für Musik und Theater München.

In 1991, Aikin made her debut at an opera gala in Berlin. From 1992 to 1998 she was a member of the ensemble of the Staatsoper Unter den Linden in Berlin where she performed more than 300 times. Her roles there included the Queen of the Night in Mozart's Die Zauberflöte, Zerbinetta in Ariadne auf Naxos by Richard Strauss, Sophie in his Der Rosenkavalier and the title role in Alban Berg's Lulu.

In 1995, she first appeared at the Vienna State Opera, as Olympia in Offenbach's Hoffmanns Erzählungen, where she also appeared as Zerbinetta, Sophie, Arminta in Die schweigsame Frau, the Queen of the Night in Mozart's Die Zauberflöte, Adele in Die Fledermaus by Johann Strauss, and Emilia Marty in Janáček's The Makropulos Affair. Also in 1995, she performed at the Salzburg Festival in a choral concert in the Mozarteum concert hall, and returned for many opera performances, as both Blonde and Konstanze in Mozart's Die Entführung aus dem Serail, the Queen of the Night, Badi'at in the world premiere of Henze's L'Upupa und der Triumph der Sohnesliebe, Marilyn in Robin de Raaff's Waiting for Miss Monroe, Marie in Bernd Alois Zimmermann's Die Soldaten and in Birtwistle's Gawain.

Aikin has appeared as a guest at major European opera houses, including the Dutch National Opera, La Monnaie in Brussels, Opéra Bastille in Paris, Opéra de Lyon, Semperoper in Dresden, Oper Frankfurt, Bavarian State Opera in Munich, Zürich Opera House, at the festival Maggio Musicale in Florence, Teatro San Carlo in Naples and at the Liceu in Barcelona. In the United States, she first appeared at the Met as the Queen of the Night in 1998/99. She took part in the world premiere of Salvatore Sciarrino's Ti vedo, ti sento, mi perdo at La Scala in Milan, in the role of the Sängerin. The opera was co-produced with the Staatsoper Berlin, where it was first performed in July 2018. Aikin is acknowledged for her vocal range of three octaves, acting talent and stage presence.

== Recordings ==
- Ludwig van Beethoven: Christus am Ölberge. Chicago Symphony Orchestra, conducted by Daniel Barenboim
- Bernard Herrmann: Wuthering Heights. Orchestre national de Montpellier, conducted by Alain Altinoglu
- Ned Rorem: Lieder, with pianist Donald Sulzen
- Arnold Schoenberg: Die Jakobsleiter. Südwestfunk Symphony Orchestra
- Ottorino Respighi: La campana sommersa. Opera de Montpellier
- Robin de Raaff: Waiting for Miss Monroe Dutch National Opera

=== DVD ===
- Alban Berg: Lulu – live from Zürich Opera House
- Hans Werner Henze: Boulevard Solitude
- Hans Werner Henze: L'Upupa
- Wolfgang Amadeus Mozart: Die Entführung aus dem Serail – Salzburg Festival
- Francis Poulenc: Dialogues des Carmélites – La Scala, conductor: Riccardo Muti
- Bernd Alois Zimmermann: Die Soldaten
