= The Nine Peahens and the Golden Apples =

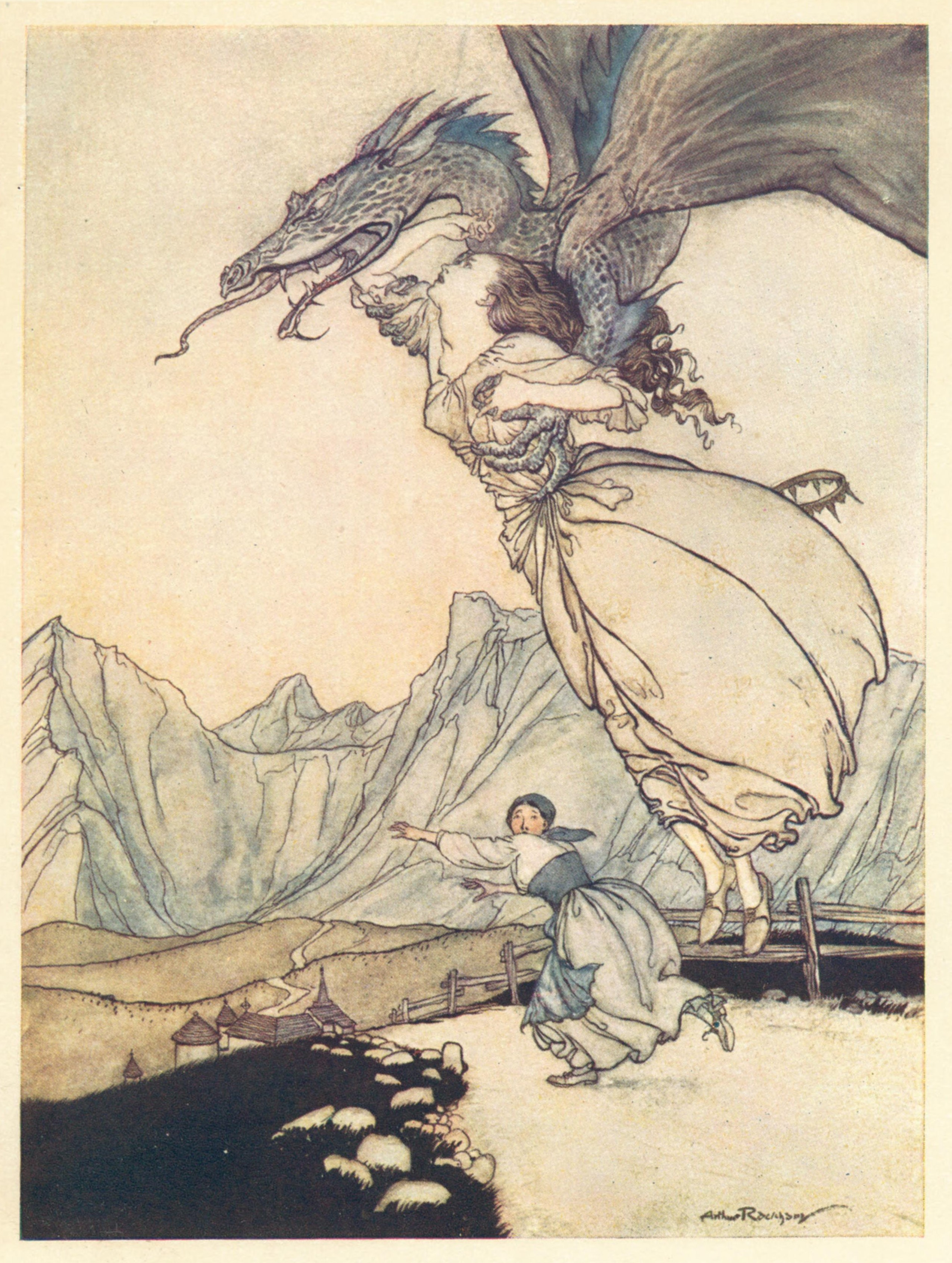
Illustration by Arthur Rackham, from The Allies Fairy Book from 1916. "The dragon flew out and caught the queen on the road and carried her away".

"The Nine Peahens and the Golden Apple" (Serbian: Златна јабука и девет пауница, Zlatna jabuka i devet paunica) is a work of Serbian epic poetry. It is classified as Aarne-Thompson type 400*, "The Swan Maiden", and as Aarne-Thompson-Uther Index (ATU) type 400, "The Quest for the Lost Wife".

== Publication history ==
It was published for the first time as a fairy tale by Vuk Stefanović Karadžić in 1853, translated into English as "The Golden Apple-tree, and the Nine Peahens" (1874) by Elodie Lawton Mijatović, and under a similar title by Woislav M. Petrovitch (1914). Later on it was published in 1890 as a Bulgarian fairy tale translated as "The Golden Apples and the Nine Peahens" by A. H. Wratislaw in his Sixty Folk-Tales from Exclusively Slavonic Sources, as tale number 38.

American illustrator and poet Katherine Pyle translated the tale as "The Seven Golden Peahens", while keeping its source as Serbian. Parker Fillmore translated the tale as The Enchanted Peafowl and indicated its source as Yugoslavian.

Anthropologist Andrew Lang in The Violet Fairy Book included a re-translation from a German translation of Karadžić's tale. Ruth Manning-Sanders included it in The Glass Man and the Golden Bird: Hungarian Folk and Fairy Tales.

== Synopsis ==
An emperor's golden apple tree was robbed every night, and his sons set themselves to watch it. The older two slept, but the youngest stayed awake. Nine peahens arrived. Eight rifled the tree, while the ninth came down beside him and became a beautiful maiden. She talked with him. He begged her to leave one apple, and she left two. This went on for two nights, until his brothers spied on him and saw how it happened. They made a bargain with a witch, and the next night she leapt up and cut off a lock of the maiden's hair. The prince caught the witch and had her executed, but the peahens did not return.

Grieving, the prince set out in search of his beloved. He found a castle with an aging empress, who had one daughter. On hearing that nine peahens bathed in the lake outside, he set out, despite her efforts to have him stay. The empress bribed the prince’s servant to blow a whistle when the nine peahens approached. This threw him into an enchanted sleep. The ninth tried to wake him, but to no avail. She told the servant they would come on the next day and never again. The next day, the servant put him to sleep again, and the maiden told him that if the prince wanted to find her, he should roll the under peg on the upper. The servant repeated this to the prince. The prince cut off the servant’s head and went on alone.

A hermit directed him to a castle where he found the ninth peahen, the empress of a kingdom. They were married at once and lived in her castle. One day his wife had to go on journey, and forbade him to go into the twelfth cellar. When he went in, a cask with iron bands about it asked him for water. He gave it three cups of water. It burst, and a dragon sprang out to fly off and capture the empress.

The prince set out in search of her. He saw a fish on the riverbank, helped it into the water, and received a scale to call it; a fox in a trap, and received a couple of hairs in return for freeing it; and a wolf in a snare, and received a couple of hairs for releasing it. He found the dragon’s palace where the empress was held captive, and they tried to escape. The dragon saw them and wanted to pursue them, but his horse told him there was plenty of time to eat and drink before setting off and, sure enough, after he had eaten and drunk, the dragon captured them. He let the prince go because of the drinks of water, but promised it would be the only clemency.

The prince returned to the dragon’s palace and had the empress ask the dragon where he got the horse. The dragon related how a witch had a mare and foal, and that whoever watched over these for her for three days would get his pick of her horses, but that whoever failed in the task would lose his life. The prince travelled to the witch's house and noticed that all around it, poles had been set up, all but one of which had a skull upon it. The witch hired the prince to look after the horses. He watched all day, but fell asleep during the night - whereupon the mare and foal escaped into the water. Using the scale he had been given, the prince summoned the fish, who told him the charm with which to get them out. When he went back for dinner, the witch scolded the horse, listened to the excuse it gave for being recaptured by the prince, and told it to try going among the foxes on the morrow. The next day the prince used the fox hairs to summon the fox to retrieve the mare and foal, and, the day after that, the wolf hairs to call the wolf to retrieve them from among the wolves.

When at last the prince came to claim his reward, he asked the witch for the ugly horse in the corner and would not be dissuaded from his choice, but straightaway hastened back to the castle on his new steed and carried off the empress. When the dragon saw this, he asked his horse whether he had time to eat and drink before setting off in pursuit, but the horse said he would not catch the fugitives, regardless of whether he ate first or set off immediately. Undaunted, the dragon set off anyway and, during the pursuit, the dragon's horse complained to the prince's steed of the effort involved in trying to catch him. The prince's horse asked the dragon's horse why it put up with it - whereupon the dragon's horse threw the dragon and killed him, and the empress rode it the rest of the way home.

== Wratislaw's version ==
In the Bulgarian version, the prince stays with the peahen for several days before the witch disturbs them. When he leaves to search for her he takes one of his servants who prevents him from seeing the maiden, whereas in the Serbian version the old empress sends her servant to go with him. The wolf has also been replaced by a crow in a trap, and instead of an ugly horse, the prince asked for a skinny horse.

== Other versions ==
Czech author Václav Tille (writing under pseudonym Václav Říha) published a similar tale, titled Berona: the youngest prince stays awake at night to see what has been stealing his father's golden apples. Later that night, he sees a flock of twelve golden peahens approaching the tree. One of them, wearing a golden crown, announces she is Princess Berona and asks the prince to find her. Later, he travels with a servant and waits for the coming of Berona. An old lady bribes the servant and orders him to blow a whistle to make the prince fall asleep.

A Hungarian variant, titled Märchen vom pfauenhaarigen Mädchen ("The Tale of the Peacock-Haired Maiden"), was translated from Hungarian into German by Elisabeth Rona-Sklárek. In this tale, a king has three sons. The youngest goes to rest in the royal gardens, and a peacock-haired maiden comes near him and becomes his beloved. A witch takes the opportunity one night to cut the maiden's hair. She is startled and disappears, so the king's son and a servant go in search for her. When they arrive at an inn, the innkeeper gives the servant a whistle to make the prince fall asleep. The prince finally finds his beloved after stealing a magic teleporting belt from the devil's three sons. Adolf Schullerus and Elisabeth Rona-Sklárek supposed it was a truncated version of the Servian tale The Golden Apple Tree and the Nine Peahens.

== Analysis ==
=== Tale type ===
This story is classified in the Aarne-Thompson-Uther Index as tale type ATU 400, "The Man of a Quest for the Lost wife" (with former subtype AaTh 400*, "Swan Maiden"), with the second part classified as ATU 302. In a recenzija (review) of a reedition of Vuk Karadžić's book of Serbian folk tales, Croatian folklorist Maja Bošković-Stulli also classified the tale as types AaTh 400 + 302.

=== Motifs ===
Romanian folklorist Marcu Beza noted that some Eastern European and Balkanic tales of the bird maiden begin with the episode of seven white birds stealing the golden apples from a tree in the king's garden (an episode similar to German The Golden Bird).

==== The hero's horse helper ====
In the story, the hero manages to defeat the villain with the help of a magical horse he tamed while working for the witch. This sequence is classified as ATU 302C, "The Magical Horse". (Note: Russian scholar Novikov named this subtype "Kascejs Tod durch ein Pferd" [Koschei's Death by a horse].) The episode of taming the horse of the wizard/sorcerer fits tale type ATU 556F*, "Herding the Wizard’s Horses". The tale is classified as subtype AaTh 302C because in the international index of folktypes both subtypes AaTh 302A and AaTh 302B were previously occupied by other stories. In this subtype, after the hero acquires the powerful horse, it either tramples the sorcerer with its hooves or influences Koschei (or a dragon)'s mount to drop its rider to his death.

=== Interpretations ===
Historical linguist Václav Blažek argues for parallels of certain motifs (the night watch of the heroes, the golden apples, the avian thief) to Ossetian Nart sagas and the Greek myth of the Garden of the Hesperides.

== See also ==
- Prâslea the Brave and the Golden Apples
- Swan Maiden
- The Death of Koschei the Deathless
- The Flower Queen's Daughter
- The Golden Bird
- The Nunda, Eater of People
- The Raven
- Tsarevitch Ivan, the Fire Bird and the Gray Wolf
- Maid Lena (Danish fairy tale)
