= Fair Brow =

Italian fairy tale

"Fair Brow" is an Italian fairy tale collected by Thomas Frederick Crane in his Italian Popular Tales.

Italo Calvino included a variant from Istria in his Italian Folktales. He notes that the grateful dead man was a common medieval motif.

== Synopsis ==
A merchant sent his son off to make money. Once he spent it all paying off a dead man's debts, so he could be buried, and another time, he bought a slave woman, the Sultan's kidnapped daughter, and married her. His father beat them both and drove them out of his home. The wife said that she would paint, and her husband would sell the paintings, though he must not tell where they came from. Turks saw them, recognized the work, and told him they wanted more. He said to come to his house, where his wife painted them, and they seized her and carried her off.

He walked on the shore, and an old man agreed to have him fish with him. They were captured by Turks and sold to the Sultan as slaves. The old man was made a gardener, and the young man to carry bouquets to the Sultan's daughter, whom the Sultan had imprisoned in a tower as punishment. One day his wife recognized him while he was singing. They escaped with a great deal of treasure.

The old man said that they must divide the treasure. The young man offered him half. When the old man asked if his wife was also half his, the young man offered him three quarters. The old man told him that he was the dead man whose debts he had paid, and vanished. The young man was reconciled with his father, who died not long after, leaving him all his wealth.

== See also ==
- The Bird 'Grip'
- The Golden-Headed Fish
- How the Hermit helped to win the King's Daughter
