= The Golden Bird =

European fairy tale

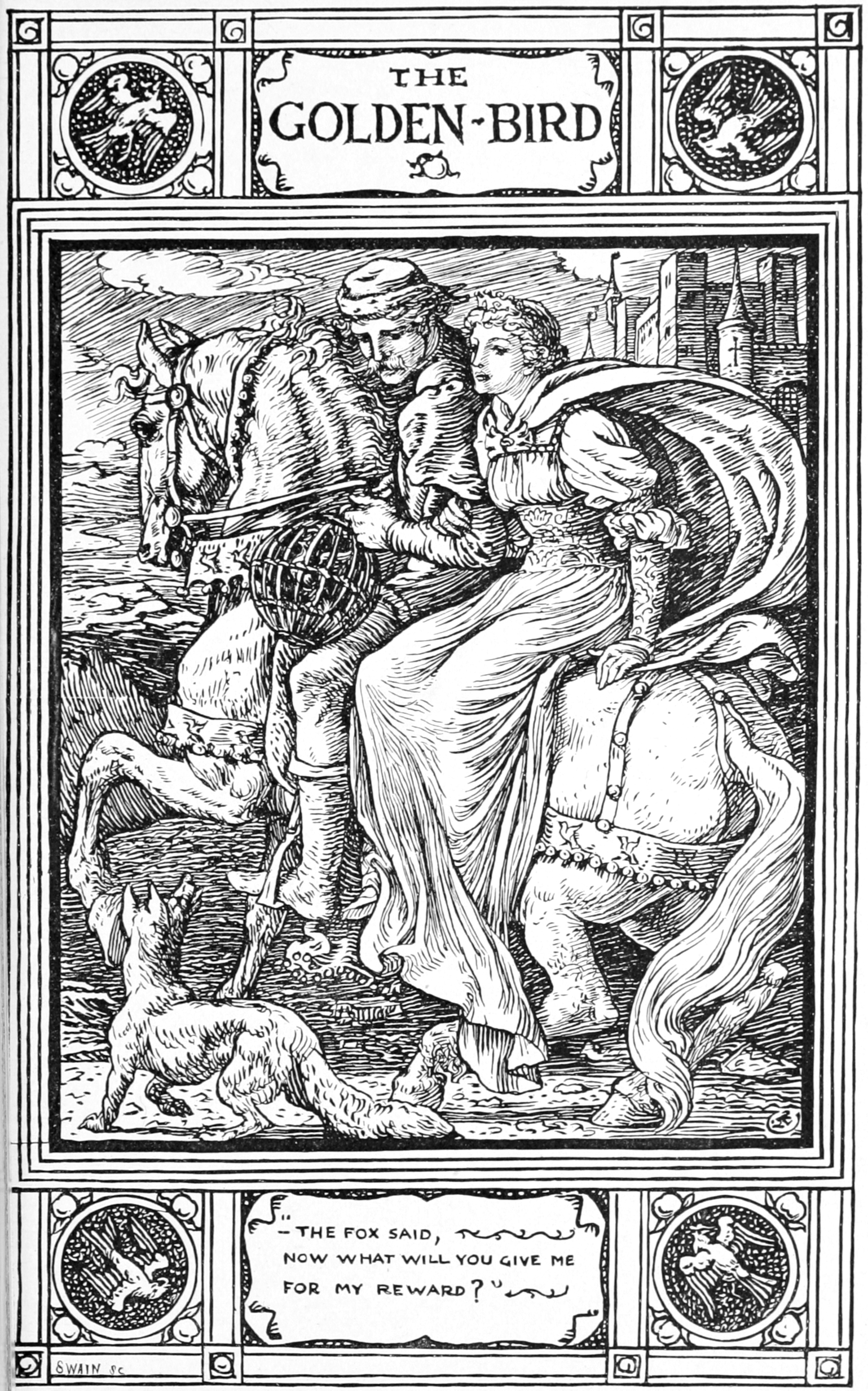
- The prince takes the princess, the horse and the golden bird in a cage, the fox at their side. Illustration by Walter Crane in Lucy Crane's translation Household stories from the collection of the Bros. Grimm (1882).

Folk tale
- Name: The Golden Bird
- Aarne–Thompson grouping: ATU 550 (The Quest for the Golden Bird; The Quest for the Firebird; Bird, Horse and Princess)
- Region: Germany
- Published in: Kinder- und Hausmärchen, by the Brothers Grimm (1812)
- Related: The Bird 'Grip'; The Greek Princess and the Young Gardener; Tsarevitch Ivan, the Fire Bird and the Gray Wolf; How Ian Direach got the Blue Falcon; The Nunda, Eater of People

"The Golden Bird" (German: Der goldene Vogel) is a fairy tale collected by the Brothers Grimm about the pursuit of a golden bird by a gardener's three sons. The Grimms included it as Tale 57 (KHM 57) in the very first volume of their famous collection, Children's and Household Tales (Kinder- und Hausmärchen, KHM).

It is classified in the Aarne–Thompson–Uther Index as type ATU 550, "Bird, Horse and Princess", a folktale type that involves a supernatural helper (animal as helper). Other tales of this type include "The Bird 'Grip'", "The Greek Princess and the Young Gardener", "Tsarevitch Ivan, the Firebird and the Gray Wolf", "How Ian Direach got the Blue Falcon", and "The Nunda, Eater of People".

== Origin ==
A similar version of the story was previously collected in 1808 and published as Die weisse Taube ("The White Dove"), provided by Gretchen Wild and published along The Golden Bird in the first edition of the Brothers Grimm compilation. In the original tale, the youngest son of the king is known as Dümmling, a typical name for naïve or foolish characters in German fairy tales. In newer editions that restore the original tale, he is known as "The Simpleton".

== Synopsis ==
"The Golden Bird" collected by the Brothers Grimm and first published in 1812, narrated and recorded on December 14, 2008

Every year, a king's apple tree is robbed of one golden apple during the night. He sets his gardener's sons to watch, and though the first two fall asleep, the youngest stays awake and sees that the thief is a golden bird. He tries to shoot it, but only knocks a feather off.

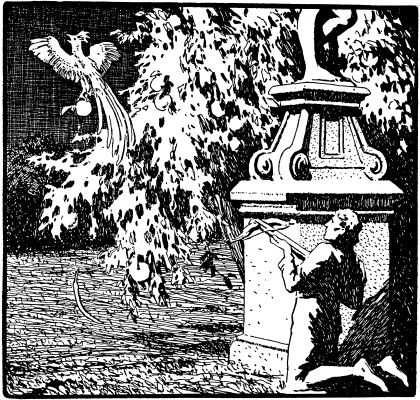
The gardener's youngest son sights the Golden Bird in the king's garden

The feather is so valuable that the king decides he must have the bird. He sends his gardener's three sons, one after another, to capture the priceless golden bird. The sons each meet a talking fox, who gives them advice for their quest: to choose an old and shabby inn over a rich and pleasant one. The first two sons ignore the advice and, in the pleasant inn, abandon their quest. The third son obeys the fox, so the fox advises him to take the bird in its wooden cage from the castle in which it lives, instead of putting it into the golden cage next to it, because this is a signal. But he disobeys, and the golden bird rouses the castle, resulting in his capture. The king of the castle agrees to spare him and give him the golden bird only if he can retrieve the golden horse. The fox advises him to use a dark gray leather saddle rather than a golden one which is a signal again, but he fails again by putting a golden saddle on a horse, resulting in his capture by a different castle. This castle's king sent him after the princess from the golden castle. The fox advises him not to let her say farewell to her parents, but he disobeys, and the princess's father orders him to remove a hill in eight days as the price of his life. The fox removes it for him, and then, as they set out, he advises the son how to keep all the things he has won since then. It then asks the son to shoot it and cut off its head. When the son refuses, it warns him against buying gallows' flesh and sitting on the edge of rivers.

He finds that his older brothers, who have been carousing and living sinfully in the meantime, are to be hanged (on the gallows) and buys their liberty. They find out what he has done. When he sits on a river's edge, they push him in, take the bird, horse and princess and bring them to their father. However, all three grieve for the youngest son. The fox rescues the prince, and when he returns to his father's castle dressed in a beggar's cloak, the bird, the horse, and the princess all recognize him as the man who won them, and become cheerful again. His older brothers get punished for their bad deeds, and he marries the princess.

Finally, at the request of the fox, the third son cuts the head off of the fox. The fox is revealed to be a man, the brother of the princess who had been enchanted by a witch after being lost for a great many years.

== Analysis ==
The tale type is characterized by a chain of quests, one after the other, that the hero must fulfill before he takes the prizes to his father. In many variants, the first object is the bird that steals the golden apples from the king's garden; in others, it is a magical fruit or a magical plant, which sets up the next parts of the quest: the horse and the princess.

=== The animal helper ===
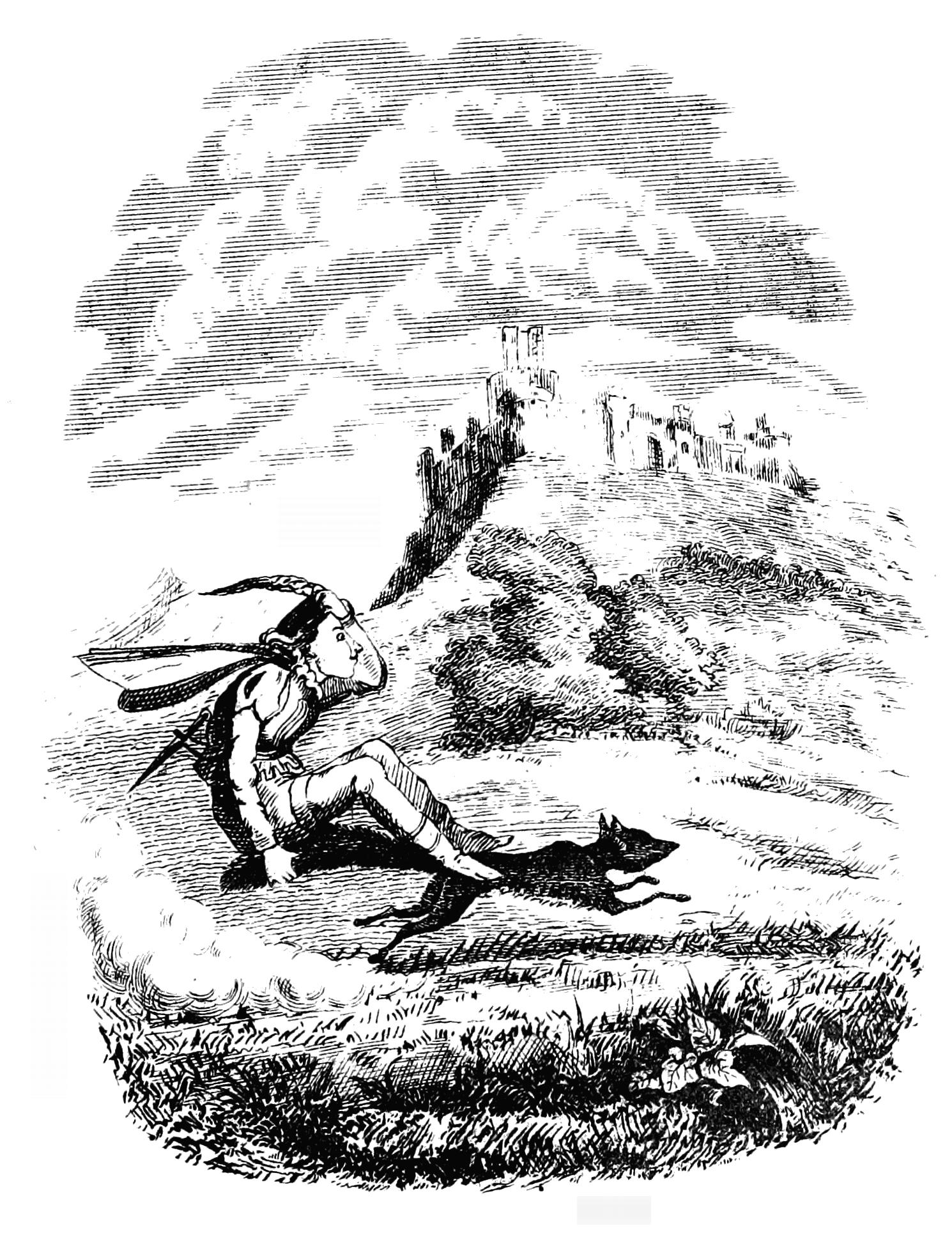
The prince rides on the fox's back. Illustration by George Cruikshank for Grimm's Goblins, by Edgar Taylor (1823).

The helper of the hero differs between versions: usually a fox or a wolf in most versions, but very rarely there is another type of animal, like a lion, a bear or a hare. In some variants, it is a grateful dead who helps the hero as return for a good deed of the protagonist.

In a variant collected in Austria, by Ignaz and Joseph Zingerle (Der Vogel Phönix, das Wasser des Lebens und die Wunderblume, or "The Phoenix Bird, the Water of Life and the Most beautiful Flower"), the tale begins with the motif of the birth of twin wonder-children, akin to "The Dancing Water, the Singing Apple, and the Speaking Bird". Cast away from home, the twins grow up and take refuge in their (unbeknownst to them) father's house. Their aunt asks for the titular items, and the fox who helps the hero is his mother's reincarnation.

In a Polish variant by Oskar Kolberg, O królewiczu i jego przyjacielu, kruku ("About the prince and his friend, the Raven"), a raven, sent by a mysterious hermit, helps a prince in his quest for a golden bird. The hero continues his quest for a golden-haired princess, then for a golden-maned horse.

In a Hungarian variant translated by Michel Klimo as L'Oiseau de Feu, the hero is a poor farmer's youngest son, named Ladislas. His helper is a "ours d'argent" (silver bear). They quest for the firebird (which has been taking his father's flowers), the silver-maned horse from the "roi de fer" ("Iron King") and the daughter of the Fairy Queen.

=== The bird as the object of the quest ===
The character of the Golden Bird has been noted to resemble the mythological phoenix bird. In this regard, according to Johannes Bolte, Jiri Polívka and Waldemar Liungman, in many variants the hero quests for the Phoenix bird.

However, in Oriental and Southeastern Europe variants, the phoenix bird is replaced altogether by a nightingale. In tales from the Middle East and Turkey, the bird's name is Hezārān Nightingale. August Leskien explained that the Hazaran bird may appear in Albanian tales as Gisar, and both names derive from the Persian word hezâr ('a thousand'), although the name may be translated as "a thousand songs" or "a thousand voices".

The Golden Bird of the Brothers Grimm tale can be seen as a counterpart to the Firebird of Slavic folklore, a bird said to possess magical powers and a radiant brilliance, in many fairy tales. The Slavic Firebird can also be known by the name Ohnivak, Zhar Bird or Bird Zhar; Glowing Bird, or The Bird of Light.

Sometimes, the king or the hero's father send the hero on his quest for the bird to cure him of his illness or blindness, instead of finding out who has been destroying his garden and/or stealing his precious golden apples. Under this lens, the tale veers close to ATU 551, "The Water of Life" (The Sons on a quest for a wonderful remedy for their father), also collected by the Brothers Grimm.

In many variants, the reason for the quest is to bring the bird to decorate a newly built church, temple or mosque, as per the suggestion of a passing beggar or hermit that informed the king of its existence. Professors Michael Meraklis and Richard MacGillivray Dawkins remarked that this is the reason for the quest in Greek variants of the tale type. In addition, Swedish scholar Waldemar Liungman located this form of the story around the Black Sea and in Greece.

In 20th century Dutch collections, the bird is sometimes called Vogel Vinus or Vogel Venus. Scholarship suggests that the name is a corruption of the name Phönix by the narrators. The name also appears in the 19th century Hungarian tale A Vénus madara ("The Bird Venus").

In a variant published by illustrator Howard Pyle, The White Bird, the prince takes part in a chain of quests: for the Fruit of Happiness, the Sword of Brightness and the titular White Bird. When the prince captures the White Bird, it transforms into a beautiful princess.

In the Hungarian variant Az aranymadár ("The Golden Bird"), the king wants to own a fabled golden bird. A prince captures the bird and it reveals it is a princess cursed into the avian form by a witch.

In an Ossetian tale titled "Соловей горной долины" ("The Nightingale from the Mountain Valley"), youth Warri/Wari lives with his old father. When the old man dies, he marries a girl and they build a house near a crossroads. Three times, passing hermits tell them the house is defective or lacks something. After much time passes, and three sons are born to them, the hermits compliment the building, but notice that their house will be even more beautiful if Warri has the Nightingale from the Mountain Valley. Frustrated with all the years, and now of an old age, his three sons promise to go on a quest for it. This tale lacks the princess and the horse, however.

=== The horse as the object of the quest ===
The horse of the variants of the tale is sometimes referenced along with the bird, attached to a special trait, such as in Flemish versions Van de Gouden Vogel, het Gouden Peerde en de Prinses, and Van de wonderschoone Prinses, het zilveren Paardeken en de gouden Vogel, and in French-Flanders version Van Vogel Venus, Peerdeken-Muishaar en Glooremonde.

The horse, in many variants of the tale, is the means by which the hero escapes with the princess. In one Italian variant, the horse is described as irraggiungibile ("unreachable").

In the Hungarian variant A vak király ("The Blind King"), a king is going blind and his three sons quest for the only cure: the golden-feathered bird. The youngest prince, with the help of a fox, joins the quest for the golden bird, the horse with silver coat and golden mane, and a princess from another kingdom.

In a French tale from Poitou, Le merle blanc ("The White Blackbird"), an old king sends his sons to find the titular white blackbird so he can be young again. When the youngest prince begins his quest, he finds a friendly fox, which informs him about the lengthy chain of quests he must make: to get the bird, he must take the "belle fille" first; to get her, he must find the mule whose every step can jump seven leagues.

=== The princess as the object of the quest ===
In the title of many variants, the Princess as the last object the hero's quest is referenced in the title. The tales usually reference a peculiar characteristic or special trait, such as in Corsican variant La jument qui marche comme le vent, l'oiseau qui chante et joue de la musique et la dame des sept beautés (Corsican: "A jumenta chi biaghja quant'u ventu, l'agellu chi canta e chi sona, a donna di sette bellezze"; English: "The she-donkey that rides like the wind, the bird that sings and plays music, and the maiden of seven beauties"), collected by Genevieve Massignon.

In Italian variant L'acqua di l'occhi e la bella di setti veli ("The water for the eyes and the beauty with seven veils"), the prince is sent on a quest for "l'acqua di l'occhi", the beauty with seven veils, the talking horse and the "aceddu Bonvirdi" (a kind of bird).

In Romanian variant Pasărea cîntă, domnii dorm, the emperor asks for the golden bird whose song makes men sleep. His son travels the lands for the fabled bird, and discovers its owner is the princess of the golden kingdom.

In Hungarian variant A próbára tett királyfi ("The king's son put to the test"), the prince is helped by a fox in his quest a golden bird and a golden horse. In the final part of the quest, the prince is tasked with kidnapping a fairy princess from her witch mother. With his faithful fox companion, which transforms into a replica of the fairy maiden to trick her mother, the prince obtains the fairy maiden.

In a tale collected by Andrew Lang and attributed to the Brothers Grimm, The Golden Mermaid, the king's golden apples are stolen by some creature or thief, so he sends his sons to find it. The youngest son, however, is the only one successful: he discovers the thief is a magic bird that belongs to an Emperor; steals a golden horse and obtains the titular golden mermaid as his wife. The tale is actually Romanian and was collected by Arthur and Albert Schott from the Banat region with the title Das goldene Meermädchen ("The Golden Sea-Maiden").

In a collection of Upper Silesian fairy tales by Joseph Freiherr von Eichendorff (unpublished at the time, but in print only later by his descendant Karl von Eichendorff containing the tale Der Vogel Venus ("The Bird Venus") or Das Märchen vom Vogel Venus, dem Pferd Pontifar und der schönen Amalia aus dem schwarzen Wald ("The Tale of the Bird Venus, the Horse Pontifar and the beautiful Amalia of the Dark Forest"), the king wants the bird Venus to regain his youth. The prince also quests for the horse Pontifar and lady Amalia, a mysterious maiden who lives in a dark castle in a dark forest, guarded by wolves, lions and bears. When the hero is ready to take her on his journey back, she is seen at the castle's gates wearing a black dress. The story is a combination of types: ATU 506, "The Grateful Dead", since the fox helper is the spirit of a dead man; ATU 551, "The Water of Life", and ATU 550, "Bird, Horse and Princess".

=== Other interpretations ===
A mythological interpretation of the tale type suggests an approximation of the Golden Bird with a peacock, a bird with astral and solar symbolism in world cultures. Likewise, the hero of the tale also rides a golden horse and rescues a beautiful maiden, which can be equated to Venus (the Morning Star) - or, according to Lithuanian scholarship, its Baltic counterpart, Aušrinė.

Historical linguist Václav Blažek argues for parallels of certain motifs (the night watch of the heroes, the golden apples, the avian thief) to Ossetian Nart sagas and the Greek myth of the Garden of the Hesperides.

== Variants ==
Scholarship acknowledges that the character of the "magic bird with glowing feathers" or with the golden plumage is known in the folklore of many peoples around the world, such as Russian “zhar-ptica”, Slovak “fire bird” and Armenian "Kush-Pari". (Note: Other examples of fantastic bird with luminous plumage are the Chilean Alicanto, Mediaeval Germanic Hercinia.)

It has been noted that the tale "is told in Middle East and in Europe", but its variants are present in traditions from the world over, including India, Indonesia and Central Africa, as well as North Africa, North, Central and South America.

Swedish folktale collectors George Stephens and Gunnar Olof Hyltén-Cavallius suggested an Eastern origin for the story.

=== Literary history ===
Scholars Stith Thompson, Johannes Bolte and Jiří Polívka traced a long literary history of the tale type: an ancient version is attested in The Arabian Nights.

A story titled Sagan af Artus Fagra is reported to contain a tale of three brothers, Carolo, Vilhiamo and Arturo of the Fagra clan, sons of the King of the Angles, who depart to India on a quest for the Phoenix bird to heal their father. It was published in an Icelandic manuscript of the 14th century. Swedish folktale collectors George Stephens and Gunnar Olof Hyltén-Cavallius listed Danish tale Kong Edvard och Prints Artus, collected in 1816, as a story related to Sagan of Artus Fagra.

Dutch scholarship states that a Flemish medieval manuscript from the 11th century, Roman van Walewein, is an ancestor of the ATU 550 tale type. In that vein, folklorist Joseph Jacobs also suggested the romance of Walewein as predecessor to "The Golden Bird" tale, albeit in regards to an Irish variant of the type.

Scholars Willem de Blécourt and Suzanne Magnanini indicate as a literary version a tale written by Lorenzo Selva, in his Metamorfosi: an illegitimate son of a king searches for the Pistis, a plant with healing powers. Later, he is forced to seek the maiden Agape, a foreign princess from a distant land, and a winged horse to finish the quest.

An almost immediate predecessor to the Grimms' tale was published in 1787, in an anonymous compilation of fairy tales. In this story, Der treue Fuchs ("The loyal fox"), the youngest son of King Romwald, Prince Nanell, shares his food with a fox and the animal helps him acquire the Phoenix bird, the "bunte Pferdchen" ("colored horse") and the beautiful Trako Maid. The publisher was later identified as Wilhelm Christoph Günther (de).

=== Oral versions ===
==== Europe ====
===== France =====
A French version, collected by Paul Sébillot in Littérature orale de la Haute-Bretagne, is called Le Merle d'or (The Golden Blackbird). Andrew Lang included that variant in The Green Fairy Book (1892). In The Golden Blackbird, the gardener's son set out because the doctors have prescribed the golden blackbird for their ill father. The two older brothers are lured into the inn without any warning, and the youngest meets the talking hare that aids him only after he passes it by. The horse is featured only as a purchase, and he did not have to perform two tasks to win the Porcelain Maiden, the princess figure. Also, the hare is not transformed at the end of the tale.

Another version, collected by François-Marie Luzel, is called Princess Marcassa and the Dreadaine Bird. There, the sick man is a king rather than a gardener, and the animal - a white fox in this variant - isn't the brother of the princess, but the soul of a poor old man whom the prince, after being robbed by his older brothers, buries with the last of his money. The prince, while stealing the bird, impregnates the princess as she sleeps, and it's the child's insistence on finding his father which makes the princess follow him and reveal the truth.

===== Ireland =====
An Irish variant of the type, published in 1936 (Le roi magicien sous la terre), seems to contain the Celtic motif of "the journey to the Other World".

===== Southern Europe =====
Galician ethnographer Lois Carré Alvarellos published a Galician tale titled O Páxaro de Ouro, wherein the king owns an orchard where there is a tree with red Portuguese apples that are stolen by the titular golden bird. He is helped by a fox and completes the quest by obtaining a golden horse and a princess with golden hair.

Author Wentworth Webster published two Basque tales: he summarized one wherein the youngest of three princes obtains the water of life to heal his father, a magic horse and a bird. In another, titled The White Blackbird, the third prince quests for a white blackbird to cure his blind father, the king, as well as a young lady from the king's house and a very beautiful horse.

====== Italy ======
The "Istituto centrale per i beni sonori ed audiovisivi" ("Central Institute of Sound and Audiovisual Heritage") promoted research and registration throughout the Italian territory between the years 1968–1969 and 1972. In 1975 the Institute published a catalog edited by Alberto Maria Cirese and Liliana Serafini reported 13 variants of type 550 across Italian sources, under the name La Ricerca dell'Uccello d'Oro.

In an Italian tale from Apulia, with the title L'acqua brillante e il pero ("The Shining Water and the Pear Tree"), a king and a queen have three sons. One day, the queen dies, leaving only the king and the princes, and eventually the king himself becomes blind. The doctors prescribe the Shining Water and the Pear Tree to cure him, and the princes go on a quest for them. However, the elder two are led astray from the quest when they ride into Taranto and spend their time at an inn and marry the innkeeper's daughters. The quest falls on the shoulders of the youngest prince, Peppinello. He pays the debts of a dead man and finds a little dog ("cagnolina"), which helps in the quest: first, for the Shining Water and the Pear Tree, which a sorcerer will trade for the enchanted horse Zaccaria that gallops fifty miles per hour, which the second sorcerer wants to trade for the Speaking Bird in the golden cage, which a third sorcerer wishes to trade for a maiden called Rosa With the Golden Hair who lives in the middle of the sea.

===== Germany =====
Folklorist Jeremiah Curtin noted that the Russian, Slavic and German variants are many, such as Die drei Gärtnerssöhne ("The gardener's three sons"); or Der Goldvogel, das Goldpferd und die Prinzeßin, by German theologue Johann Andreas Christian Löhr.

In the Plattdeutsche (Low German) variant collected by Wilhelm Wisser, Vagel Fenus, the protagonist searches for the bird Fenus because his father dreamt that it could restore his health, while in the tale De gollen Vagel, the tale begins with the usual vigil at the garden to protect the tree of golden apples.

In a variant from Flensburg, Guldfuglen ("Goldbird"), the gardener's youngest son, with the help of a fox, searches for the White Hart and the "White Maiden" ("hivde Jomfru").

In a dialectal German tale from Grabatz, Banat, collected from informant Margarete Birkenheuer with the title Die Goldent ("The Golden Duck"), a king becomes ill and has a dream about the feather from the golden bird (a duck) that can cure his eyes. The king's youngest son begins his quest for the golden duck and finds its nest with silver eggs. He goes to steal the bird when the animal honks to alert its master, a giant, who comes to stop the theft. The giant sends the prince for a stallion in a stable, but the animal neighs and alerts its master, twelve giants, who send the prince to capture a maiden from her father's garden.

===== Hungary =====
In a Hungarian tale titled A csodás szőlőtő ("The Wonderful Grapevine"), three princes ask his father, the king, why one of his eyes laughs while the other cries. This prompts a quest for the king's lost grapevine and, later, for the savage paripa (horse) from another king and a beautiful princess.

In another Hungarian variant translated by Michel Klimo as an alternative version of L'Oiseau de Feu, the hero is a king's son who is helped by a wolf. In his quest, the prince gets the golden-feathered bird, a golden-maned horse from the seven-headed dragon, and the golden-haired princess from the twelve-headed dragon.

===== Poland =====
In a Polish variant, About Jan the Prince, the fabled bird is named "The Flamebird". The tale was originally collected by Antoni Josef Glinski, with the title O Janie królewiczu, żar-ptaku i o wilku wiatrolocie ("About Jan the Prince, the Flamebird and the Wind-like Wolf"). With the help of the wind-wolf, Prince Jan takes part in a quest for the Flamebird, a golden-maned steed and Princess Wonderface.

===== South Slavic =====
In a Yugoslavian variant, The Little Lame Fox, Janko, the naive but good-hearted youngest son of a farmer, is helped by a fox in his quest for the Golden Apple-Tree, the Golden Horse, the Golden Cradle and the Golden Maiden. The Golden Maiden, a princess herself, insists that she will marry Janko, for his good and brave heart.

===== Slovakia =====
In a Slovak tale Popelvár, the foolish hero gets the bird for his father, the king, but he is killed by his brothers, who also take his wife, princess Sipsindilona. In this tale, the princess shows more agency than other heroines and tries to find a way back to her beloved on her own terms.

===== Czech Republic =====
In a Czech tale collected by Karel Jaromír Erben, Ptak Ohnivák a Liška Ryška ("The Firebird and the Red Fox"), the youngest prince is helped by a red fox in his quest for the Ohnivák, the horse Zlatohřivák and the maiden Zlatovláska ("Golden-Hair"). He also published the tale in the Czech almanac Máj, and even compared it to the German tale by the Grimms.

===== Bulgaria =====
In a Bulgarian variant, "Златното птиче" ("The Golden Bird"), the king orders his sons to guard his prized golden apple-tree from the nocturnal thief. The youngest prince discovers it is a bird with "fiery-like, luminous feathers". The kings sends his sons to look for the bird: the two elders give up on the quest as soon as they begin, while the youngest meets an old man who helps him. The prince gets the bird and a flying horse as part of the quest, and marries the daughter of the king who owns the golden bird.

===== Udmurt people =====
In a tale from the Udmurt people published by folklorist Nadezhda Kralina with the title "Дочь хозяина мира" ("The Daughter of the Lord of the World"), a poor man has three sons and tasks them with watching the crops against a nocturnal thief. The elder two fail, but the youngest, Petir, discovers a bird of dazzling beauty and golden plumage. They go on a journey and meet a man on the road; the elder two are rude to him and the old man sends them to their deaths at the hands of a bear and a wolf. The youngest is kind and the old man gives him a flying carpet. Petir, then, takes part in a chain of quests for the golden bird from the lord of the air, the golden-maned horse from the lord of the earth, the golden-scaled perch from the lord of the water, and the daughter of the lord of the world. The tale was also translated into Hungarian with the title A világgazda lánya ("The Daughter of the Lord of the World"), and sourced from the Votjak (another designation for the Udmurt people).

===== Slovenia =====
In a Slovenian variant published by author and linguist Matija Valjavec with the title Zlata tica ("Golden Bird"), the hero is the youngest of three princes. He is helped by a bear (Slovenian: medved) and quests for the titular golden bird, a horse "unlike any other in nine realms" and a mermaid (Slovenian: morsko deklico; 'maiden from the sea'). The tale is considered to be the earliest appearance in print of the tale type in Slovenia.

===== Scandinavian =====
Variants from Scandinavia countries have been attested in the works of Svend Grundtvig (Danish variant "The Golden Bird" or Guldfuglen) and Peter Asbjornsen (Norwegian variant "The Golden Bird" or Gullfuglen).

According to scholar Ørnulf Hodne's The Types of the Norwegian Folktale, tale type 550, known in Norway as Gullfuglen, registers 25 variants across Norwegian sources.

===== Baltic Countries =====
====== Lithuania ======
August Leskien collected variants from Lithuania, where the wolf is the helper, akin to Slavic variants: Vom Dummbart und dem Wolf, der sein Freund war. In this tale, a blind king has an orchard with a golden-apple tree. A luminous bird steals the apples and the youngest son, a fool, goes after it and takes part in a quest for a white horse and a princess who has never set eyes on any man.

In another Lithuanian tale by Leskian and Brugmann, also titled Von dem Dummbart und dem Wolf, der sein Freund war, the apples are made of diamond and the thieving bird is a falcon. The foolish youngest son gets the bird, a fine horse and a princess of great beauty.

====== Latvia ======
In a Latvian variant collected in 1877 by Fricis Brīvzemnieks, "одарѣ раскрасавицѣ царевић и братѣдуракѣ съ его помощниками" ("The talented princes, the foolish brother and his helpers"), the king sets a deadline for his three sons: one year from now, they must capture and bring him the golden bird that ate his golden apples. The youngest son is the only one that soldiers on, and eventually captures the bird, two dogs, a steed and a princess. Fricis Brīvzemnieks, in the same book, gave an abridged summary of two other variants: in one, the prince abducts a princess with golden hair, eyes like dew and fingernails like diamonds, and in the other, when the prince captures the golden bird, it uses its power to revive the older brothers who were petrified.

===== Armenia =====
Armenian scholarship reports at least 60 variants of tale type ATU 550 in Armenian publications.

===== Azerbaijan =====
In an Azeri tale titled "Соловей Хазарандастана" (Azeri: "һазарандастан бұлбүлү", Hazarandastan bülbülü; English: "The Nightingale of Khazarandastan"), a padishah has a beautiful garden. One day, however, some visitors compliment the garden, but say it lacks Bili-Bilgeis Khanum ("Lady Bilgeis"), a rose of Khazarandastan and the nightingale of Khazarandastan, and the horse Suleimani-ereb ("Solomon's Arabian Horse"). Hearing their conversation, the padishah decides to send his three sons to quest for the objects. The elder princes fail and end up in heavy debts in two cities, while the youngest prince finds the rose and the nightingale, tames the horse by uttering the name of prophet Solomon, and defeats Bili-Bilgeis Khanum in battle to win her over. The young prince takes the four objects with him and pays his brothers' debts. In gratitude, the elder brothers do not want to deal with their father, since they failed the quest, and decide to steal the credit: they tie his brother's feet and arms and throw him in a well, then take the rose, the nightingale and the Khanum with them, and leave the horse behind, since it recognizes the younger brother as its master.

===== Caucasus Region =====
In a variant from the Karachay-Balkars with the title "Золотая птица" ("Golden Bird"), the titular golden bird steals magic apples from the king's garden that grant youth and restore vitality. For three years, the king orders his three sons to guard the tree. On the third year, the youngest prince discovers the bird. With the help of a wolf, he then takes part in a quest for the golden-maned horse of the Earth Khan and a goldfish from the lake of Khan Dadiyana.

In a tale from the Nogais titled "Золотая птица" ("Golden Bird"), an old man has three sons and an apple tree in his garden. Someone creeps into his garden and steals the golden apples from the tree, so he orders his sons to stand guard on the garden. The elder two fail, but the youngest, taken to be a fool by his elders, discovers the golden bird. With the help of a wolf, he also acquires a gray horse with golden mane and liberates a golden-haired maiden from the many-headed azdahas.

==== Asia ====
===== Syria =====
In a Syrian tale collected by Uwe Kuhr with the title Der Falke ("The Falcon"), a king has two sons named Saif ad-Din and Baha ad-Din by his first wife, and a son named Aladdin by his Black concubine. He also has a beautiful tree in his garden, with leaves of gold, silver and diamonds that are stolen by a giant falcon. The three sons stand guard on the tree, but only Aladdin discovers the falcon. The king then sends them after the bird. Aladdin rescues a snake that becomes a girl and offers him guidance in his quest: for the bird from the Hall of Birds of Prey, for the flying horse of the giant demons, for the all-crushing sword that vanquishes enemies, and for princess Fatima, taken by the ghouls.

In an Arab tale collected by Enno Littmann from a Syrian source and translated to German language with the title Die Geschichte von dem Vogel mit der Feder ("The Story of the Bird with the Feather"), a king has three sons, ‘Adschîb, Gharîb and Kasîm. One day, the king is sitting on his throne room when a bird flies in, picks up a hair of his beard and flies away. The bird returns twice again, but on the third time, the king manages to catch a gold feather from the bird's tail. He then announces he wishes to have the bird and sends his sons after it. The elder two princes stop by a crossroads and leave their quest, while Kasîm journeys on. With the help of a demon, prince Kasîm reaches the garden where the gold bird is, inside a cage. He tries to capture the bird, but its owner, a king, is alerted of the attempted theft and sends Kasîm for the Rennpferd (a racehorse). To get the Racehorse, which belongs to another king, Kasîm has to obtain a pomegranate in such-and-such a garden from another monarch. The king who owns the garden promises to give Kasîm two pomegranates in exchange for the daughter of the Jewish king, princess Badî‘at el-Husn wal-Dschamâl. After stealing the princess and obtaining the objects, with the demon taking their forms to trick the monarchs, Kasîm also rescues two captive princesses from their demonic captors in an underground lair, then returns to free his brothers from servitude and is betrayed by them. Due to this, the Jewish princess transforms into a Black slave, the bird's feathers lose their luster and turn white, the pomegranates turn black, and the race horse becomes a lame horse ("Klepper", in Littmann's translation).

===== South Asia =====
In an Indian variant, In Search of a Dream, the youngest prince quests for an emerald bird, because his father, the king, had a dream about a beautiful garden, with a tree in it where the bird was perched. Apart from this tale, Indian scholar A. K. Ramanujan pointed the existence of twenty-seven variants collected from all over India.

===== North Asia =====
In a Tatar tale collected in Tobolsk, Der den Vogel suchende Fürstensohn ("The Prince's Son that seeks the bird") and published in Vasily Radlov's collection, the prince's youngest son watches his father's house at night and finds a bird. Soon, he travels to capture the bird and bring it home. With the help of a wolf, he later steals seven wonderful horses and a golden cithara from two different foreign princes and finally abducts a princess from a fourth realm.

In a tale from a Shor teller, titled "ПТИЦА СЧАСТЬЯ" ("The Bird of Good Fortune"), a rich man has three sons, the youngest named Alyg Ool. Alyg Ool is considered a fool and has slept by the fireplace so many years his skin is full of soot. One day, the father orders his sons to stand guard at their crops and shoo away the birds. Near the crops stands a beautiful birch tree. They notice that the birch leaves are being eaten by something, so they spend the next three nights on a vigil. The elder two fail, but Alyg Ool, the youngest, discovers a golden bird. He decides to pluck a feather from its body, instead of shooting it, and chases after it. To help him, he buys a horse. He follows the bird to the kingdom of a kaan. Alyg Ool tries to take the bird, but he accidentally sounds the bells and alerts the kaan. The kaan wakes up and asks Alyg Ool to bring him a maiden named Altyn Tarak.

===== Central Asia =====
Tajik folklorist Klavdia Ulug-Zade published a Tajik tale titled "ХАСАН И ВОЛК" ("Hasan and the Wolf"). In this tale, the king is quite sad, until he is convinced to visit other cities and their gardens. He learns that on the fortieth garden, a wondrous tree produces a flower and a fruit, but they are stolen by a bird. He asks his son Hasan to stand guard on the tree and bring him the flower, the fruit and the bird. Hasan stands guard on three nights, and on the third discovers the bird. He shoots at it and it drops a feather with something writing on it. He is approached by a wolf, who helps him obtain the beautiful daughter of another padishah, and the yellow horse that belongs to a div.

In an Uyghur tale translated to Turkish with the title Batur Kız ("Brave Girl"), an old man is rich with many possessions, and has six sons and one daughter. One day, the youngest son goes on a journey and does not return, so he weeps for his son's absence until he becomes blind. A physician prescribes the remedy that is located in the distant city of Rum. The male children offer to go in search of the remedy, but squander their riches and return home empty-handed. The youngest daughter offers to go, takes a mule and goes on a journey. She meets a dragon on the way, but pays no heed to it. The dragon questions why she did so, and the girl reveals she is in a hurry to help her father. The dragon then offers his help to the girl, and they take part in a chain of quests for the remedy: she reaches the treasury of the Shah of Rum where the remedy (some medicine wrapped in paper and a medicine inside a box) is located, but the Shah of Rum wants the princess of Enedir Han in return; Enedir Han will consent to deliver his daughter, if the girl brings back the tulpar horse of the witch that lives on Kuhikap. After obtaining the objects of the quest and restoring her father's sight, the dragon shakes himself and reveals he is the rich man's missing son, who fell in love with Enedir Han's daughter and was transformed into a dragon when he was nearly capturing the witch's tulpar horse, a miraculous steed.

====== Uzbekistan ======
In an Uzbek tale titled "Сладкоголосый соловей" ("The Nightingale with the Sweet Voice"), a cruel sheik or shah orders the construction of a splendid tree made of gold and jewels he collected all his life. After it is made, some nocturnal thief begins to steal pieces of the tree. The shah's three sons decide to hold a night watch. Only the youngest discovers the culprit: a bird of immense beauty - its beak of ruby, the feathers of pearls and coral, and with a sweet-sounding voice. The shah decides that whoever brings the bird shall inherit the throne. A monkey is the helper in this variant, and the prince also quests for a beautiful princess that sleeps in a golden ark, and a horse named Kara Kaldyrgotsch from magician Orsaky, who lives in the Isle of Diamonds.

In an Uzbek tale translated to Turkish with the title Kör Gözü Açan Kız ("The Girl Who Opened Her Father's Blind Eyes"), a local landowner has six sons and one daughter. One day, the youngest son goes on a journey and does not return, so he grows worried and cries nonstop, to the point where he becomes blind. A friend of his notices this and says that there is a cure for him, in the distant land of Rum. The male children offer to go in search of the remedy, but squander their riches and return home empty-handed. The youngest daughter offers to go, takes a mule and goes on a journey. She meets a dragon on the way, but pays no heed to it. The dragon questions why she did so, and the girl reveals she is in a hurry to help her father. The dragon then offers his help to the girl, and they take part in a chain of quests for the remedy: she reaches the treasury of the Sultan of Rum where the remedy (some medicine wrapped in paper and some medicine in a bottle) is located, but the Sultan of Rum wants the daughter of Anadır Han in return; Anadır Han will consent to deliver his daughter, if the girl brings back the black horse of the witch that lives on Mount Qaf. After obtaining the objects of the quest and restoring her father's sight, the dragon shakes himself and reveals he is the landowner's missing son, who fell in love with Anadır Han's daughter and was transformed into a dragon when he was nearly capturing the horse of Kara Khan.

===== East Asia =====
In a Mongolian tale translated as Die goldenen Äpfel ("The Golden Apples"), a prince plants apple trees in his garden, and they wield beautiful apples. One year, however, the apples begin to disappear, and the prince asks his three sons to investigate into the matter. The youngest brother discovers that, at night, a rainbow appears and some birds fly about to eat the apples. The third son snatches a feather and shows it to his father, who proclaims that whoever brings him the bird shall inherit his throne. The third son begins the quest: he sacrifices his horse to feed a wolf who becomes his mount and guide, and eventually steals a horse from the chaan and rescues one of the Prince Olgör's daughters from an unwanted marriage. At the end of the tale, the wolf asks for a heavy golden axe to be made and to be used on him. The prince's third son, reluctantly, kills the wolf, but the animal changes back into his original human form.

==== Africa ====
May Augusta Klipple's 1938 study locates variants of type 550 in Africa among the Swahili and in Kordofan.

===== North Africa =====
In a North African tale translated from Arabic to Russian with the title "Молодой принц" ("Young Prince"), a king owns a garden with a magic tree that yields golden apples, but which are stolen every night. Thus, the king stands guard all night and discovers the culprit: a bird with golden plumage. The following morning, the king orders his sons to capture the bird: the princes lie in wait on different nights, but the elder two fail due to falling asleep, and the youngest manages to steal a single feather. The king guards the feather in a chest, forgetting about it for months, until he opens the chest again. He then orders his sons to fetch him the bird. The three princes go on a quest and part ways at a crossroads. The youngest prince walks into a road and suddenly his horse falls ill and dies, and a wolf appears to offer its help, explaining that the crossroads had an inscription: on one way, the rider would die, on the other, their mount. The prince agrees with the wolf's help and takes part in a chain of quests: for the fiery-golden bird, locked in a golden cage in a tree of gems, for a horse with golden teeth as quick as lightning, and for a princess more beautiful than the Moon who is located beyond seven seas, seven mountains and seven deserts.

In an Egyptian tale titled The Gold Falcon, a rich carpet merchant her three sons, elder twins Raheel and Raheem and the younged Nahad, the most studious and dilligent of the three. One day, Nahad is resting in the shade of a mulberry tree when a gold feather drops in his hand. Nahad deduces it belongs to a gold falcon, and his elder twin brothers pluck it from his hands to show their father. Their father decides to send them on the quest for the gold falcon. Nahad goes on the quest and shoots an arrow at some hyenas menacing a leopard. The leopard changes into a beautiful houri, the daughter of the King of the Jinns, and directs the youth to the gold falcon. As part of teh quest, he goes after the gold falcon, then is sent for a glass horse that grazes up in a mountain, and to rescue the Maiden of Grace and Beauty, daughter of the lord who owns that glass horse and who was kidnapped by an old ghoul.

===== Northeast Africa =====
German ethnologue Leo Frobenius collected a tale from Kordofan with the title Vogel, Pferd, Büchse ("The Bird, The Horse, The Box"): a Melik has a beautiful tree in the garden that yields seven apricot-like fruits. However, one night, a bird comes and takes one of the seven fruits, until there it none. The youngest son offers to stand guard on the tree the next night and shoot at the bird, which leaves a feather. The youth takes the feather and shows his father, who wants the bird for himself. The three sons go on a quest for the bird; the two elders brothers stop at a crossroads, read the signposts and cease their questing. The youngest son continues on his quest, with the help of an Aldjann: he obtains a bird, a horse that can be summoned everywhere by simpling rubbing some hairs from his mane, and a box that holds another king's servants, drummers and trumpeters. When he gets the box, the prince opens it and a large retinue comes out. The Aldjann helps the prince put everyone inside again and close the box. The tale was translated to Russian as "Птица, конь и ларец" ("Bird, Horse and Stall"), sourced from the Nubian people.

===== Central Africa =====
In a variant from Congo, The Tale of the Golden Birds, a flock of golden-coloured Golden Birds fly over the kraal, and the local king sends his 11 sons after them. During their long journey, every one of the brothers decide to settle in a local village, until there is only one brother left to continue their quest. He arrives at the city of the Golden Birds, whose people demand the Magic Drum. In turn, the people who have the drum ask for the Golden Queen from the city that rules over all the land and who shines like the sun. The youngest gets the prizes and visits his brothers before returning to their father. His brothers, however, kill him and take the birds, the drum and the woman to their father. A little dog, which the Golden Queen took with her, resurrects the slain brother, who goes to his home city and reveals his brothers' treachery.

===== Eastern Africa =====
German linguist Carl Gotthilf Büttner published a Swahili tale titled Kisa cha binti Matlai Shems (German: "Die Geschichte von Fräulein Matlai Shems"): a king with six sons by his official wife and a seventh by a concubine sees a bird with golden wings and legs of mother-of-pearl. The king wants the bird for himself and sends his seven sons after him. The six elders begin their quest, but cease midway, for they believe their father lost his mind. Only the youngest soldiers on, and obtains the bird, a Sword of Thunder and princess Matlai Shems ('East, the place where the Sun rises'). Büttner, on a footnote, supposed that the tale was a fragment of a larger story.

In an Eastern African variant, "История Маталаи Шамси, принцессы Заря" ("The Story of Matalai Shamsi, Princess of the Dawn"), a king and his seven sons are sitting in the garden, when a beautiful luminous bird passes by them. The king wants his sons to get the bird for him and sends them. Six of them decide to give up the quest partway through, while their youngest half-brother, Shamsudini, vows to fulfil their father's request. He meets a djinn on his way who becomes his helper after getting him food. Shamsudini embarks on a quest for the Thunder-Sword and Matalai Shamsi, the "Princess Sunrise". The story was first published by Dutch linguist Jan Knappert with the title The Story of Bibi Matalai Shamsi, 'Princess Sunrise', and sourced as from the Swahili.

German linguist Carl Velten published another Swahili tale titled Msiwanda ('The lastborn son'). In this tale, a king has seven sons: Salem, Sleman, Nasur, Said, Hemedi, Abdallah and Msiwanda ('The last born son'). One day, a beautiful bird perches on a tree in their garden and the king marvels at the bird, wanting to have it for himself. He sends his seven sons after the bird. On the journey, each of them eventually gives up and stops by every city on the way. Only Msiwanda continues the journey, and obtains the bird, the Thunder Sword, the Drum that sounds seven times louder and a woman named Binti Sanabu.

===== Western Africa =====
In a tale from the Ndowe people of Equatorial Guinea, Los tres reyes ("The Three Kings"), there are three kings, one that owns an orchard, the second a golden bird and the third a golden horse. The golden bird flies over to the first king's orchard to eat fruits, which greatly inconveniences the first king. So he announces that whoever brings him the bird, shall marry his daughter. A youth leaves his village and walks to the second king to get the bird, which he brings to the first king, and later to the third king to get golden horse. However, the youth has a last task from the first king: raze a mountain to the ground. With the help of an old woman, the youth fulfills the task and marries the princess. He then prepares to go back to his village with the bird, the horse, and his wife, but the old woman appears again to warn him that his brothers will trick him and steal his possessions and his wife.

In another tale from the Ndowe people with the title Los cuatro reyes ("The Four Kings"), there live four kings, one with a golden apple tree, another that owns a golden bird, a third a golden horse, and the fourth has a golden daughter. The son of the first king watches over the golden apple tree for the thieving golden bird, and later goes on a quest for the golden horse and the fourth king's golden daughter, with the help of a leopard.

==== Americas ====
===== Canada =====
A similar variant fairy tale of French-Canadian origin is The Golden Phoenix collected by Marius Barbeau, and retold by Michael Hornyansky. It follows the hero Petit Jean, the youngest son of the King, who discovers the thief of his father's golden apple to be a golden Phoenix, a legendary bird. Other differences include a battle with 3 mythical beasts, a Sultan's game of hide-and-seek and his marriage with the Sultan's beautiful daughter.

===== United States =====
Variants have been recorded from American regions and states: a version named The Golden Duck from West Virginia; a tale The King's Golden Apple Tree, from Kentucky; a version from the American Southwest.

In a French-Missourian variant, L'Zouéseau d'Or ("The Golden Bird"), the youngest prince, P'tit Jean (Little John) finds out that the golden bird is the thief from his father's garden. He then goes on a quest for a golden-maned horse and the Prettiest Princess in the World, with the help of a fox. At the end of the tale, the fox is revealed to be the princess's brother.

===== Mexico =====
J. Alden Mason collected a variant from Mexico, titled Cuento del Pájaro del Dulce Canto (English: "The Bird of the Sweet Song").

===== Peru =====
In a Peruvian tale collected from informant María Filomena Turema, in Chiloé Island, with the title El Pájaro de Fuego ("The Firebird"; "The Bird of Fire"), a king has a golden apple tree in his garden whose fruits are being stolen at night, so his sons, princes Pedro, Juan and Diego, offer to stand watch. The elder two fail, but the youngest, Juan, discovers the culprit by throwing a rock at it. The bird escapes, but leaves behind its feather. Juan says that it was the bird of fire, and their father orders his sons to capture it and bring it back. Juan takes his horse and goes to the road, when a lion appears and devours the horse, then offers its help to the young prince. With the lion's help, prince Juan takes part in a chain of quests: the bird of fire for the horse with the silver mane, which belongs to the king of the enchanted night ("rey de la noche encantada"); and the horse for princess Helena, the beautiful.

===== Brazil =====
In a Brazilian variant collected by Sílvio Romero in Sergipe, A Raposinha (English: "The little fox"), a prince stops three men from beating a dead person, and in gratitude is helped by a fox in his search for a parrot from the Kingdom of Parrots as a cure for the king's blindness.

Author Figueiredo Pimentel published a Portuguese Brazilian tale titled O Besouro de Ouro ("The Golden Beetle"): king Hostiaf VI loses his sight after he walks among some thorns, and his youngest son, Julião, goes on a quest for a remedy to cure him. With the help of the titular Golden Beetle (which is the soul of a dead man), he takes part on a chain of quests: the cure for his father is the blood of a feeble-looking parrot in the kingdom of Parrots; to get the parrot, he is tasked with getting a sword from the Kingdom of the Swords; to get the sword, he has to steal the lamest looking horse from the Kingdom of Horses; lastly, to get the horse, he is orders to capture the princess from a neighbouring kingdom. With the Golden Beetle's advice, he brings them all with him, and meets his elder brothers en route to their kingdom. The elder princes, jealous of their cadet's success, throw him in a well and take the parrot, the sword, the horse and the princess with them.

=== Literary versions ===
French author Edouard Laboulaye included a literary version named The Three Wonders of the World in his book Last Fairy Tales: the queen wishes for a magical bird that can rejuvenate people with its song. The youngest prince also acquires the winged horse Griffon and a wife for himself, the princess Fairest of the Fair.

Italian author Luigi Capuana used the motif of the golden-coloured bird stealing the apples in his literary fiaba Le arance d'oro ("The Golden Apples"), where a goldfinch is sent to steal the oranges in the King's orchard.

Professor Jack Zipes states that the tale type inspired Russian poet Pyotr Pavlovich Yershov to write his fairy tale poem The Little Humpbacked Horse. The tale begins akin to ATU 530, "The Princess on the Glass Mountain", (hero finds or captures wild horse(s) with magical powers) and continues as ATU 550: the envious Tsar asks the peasant Ivan to bring him the firebird and the beautiful Tsar-Maid.

A literary treatment of the tale exists in The True Annals of Fairy-Land: The Reign of King Herla, titled The Golden Bird: with the help of friendly fox, the king's youngest son ventures to seek the Golden Bird, the Golden Horse and a princess, the Beautiful Daughter of the King of the Golden Castle. At the conclusion of the tale, the fox is revealed to be the Princess's brother, transformed into a vulpine shape.

Czech school teacher Ludmila Tesařová (cs) published a literary version of the tale, named Pták Zlatohlav, wherein the knight quests for the golden-headed bird whose marvellous singing can cure an ailing princess.

== Adaptations ==
A Hungarian variant of the tale was adapted into an episode of the Hungarian television series Hungarian Folk Tales (Magyar népmesék). It was titled The Fox Princess (A rókaszemü menyecske).

The tale type also inspired the composition of the Märchenoper L'Upupa und der Triumph der Sohnesliebe ("The Hoopoe and the Triumph of Filial Love"), inspired by a Syrian fairy tale titled Die Geschichte von dem Vogel mit der Feder.

== See also ==
- Firebird (Slavic folklore)
- Ibong Adarna
- Laughing Eye and Weeping Eye
- Prâslea the Brave and the Golden Apples
- The Bold Knight, the Apples of Youth, and the Water of Life
- The Brown Bear of the Green Glen
- The Golden-Headed Fish
- The King of England and his Three Sons
- The Nine Peahens and the Golden Apples
- The Sister of the Sun
- The Story of Bensurdatu
- The Water of Life
- The Little Green Frog (French literary fairy tale)

== Bibliography ==
- Bolte, Johannes; Polívka, Jiri. Anmerkungen zu den Kinder- u. hausmärchen der brüder Grimm. Erster Band (NR. 1-60). Germany, Leipzig: Dieterich'sche Verlagsbuchhandlung. 1913. pp. 503–515.
- Cosquin, Emmanuel. Contes populaires de Lorraine comparés avec les contes des autres provinces de France et des pays étrangers, et précedés d'un essai sur l'origine et la propagation des contes populaires européens. Tome I. Paris: Vieweg. 1887. pp. 212–222.
- Hyltén-Cavallius, Gunnar Olof och Stephens, George. Svenska Folk-Sagor och Äfventyr. Förste Delen. Stockholm: pa A. Bohlins Förlag. 1844. pp. 151–152 and 164–168.
- Hyltén-Cavallius, Gunnar Olof och Stephens, George. Svenska Folk-Sagor och Äfventyr. Förste Delen. Stockholm: pa A. Bohlins Förlag. 1849. pp. 488–489.
- Schott, Arthur and Schott, Albert. Walachische Maehrchen. Stuttgart: J. G. Cotta. 1845. pp. 368–370.
