= The Bird 'Grip' =

Swedish fairy tale

The Bird 'Grip' is a Swedish fairy tale. Andrew Lang included it in The Pink Fairy Book. It is Aarne-Thompson type 550, the quest for the golden bird/firebird; other tales of this type include The Golden Bird, The Greek Princess and the Young Gardener, How Ian Direach got the Blue Falcon, The Nunda, Eater of People, and Tsarevitch Ivan, the Fire Bird and the Gray Wolf.

== Summary ==
A king lost his sight. An old woman said that the song of the bird, 'Grip', would restore it. The king's eldest son offered to fetch the bird, from where it was kept in a cage by another king; but on his way to fetch the bird, he stayed at a merry inn, where he enjoyed himself so much that he forgot about his journey. His two brothers followed; the second also stayed at the inn, but the youngest said that he had to fetch the bird 'Grip', and continued on instead of remaining at the inn.

He stayed at a house in the woods where he heard shrieks in the night. In the morning, he asked about the shrieks. A girl told him that they came from a dead man, whom the innkeeper had beat and killed for not being able to pay the bill, and whom he refused to bury without the money for the funeral. The prince paid his bill, but was afraid to stay longer, so he asked the girl to help him escape in the night. She told him the host kept the key to the stables under his pillow, but she would help him if he would take her with him. He did so, and got her a place at a good inn before he went on.

The youngest son then met a fox, which told him it could help him. When they got to the castle where the bird was, the fox gave him three grains: one for the guardroom, one for the room with the cage, one for the cage itself. Then he could take the bird, but he must not stroke it. He obeyed with the grains, but when he decided to stroke the bird, it woke and screamed. He was captured. In prison, the fox appeared and told him to answer "Yes" to everything at the trial. He was asked whether he was a master thief and he answered yes. The king offered to pardon him if he carried off the world's most beautiful princess, from the next kingdom.

The fox gave him three grains again: for the guardroom, the princess's chamber, and her bed, and warned him not to kiss the princess, but he failed again at the kiss. Again at the trial, he was asked whether he was a master thief and he answered yes. The king offered to pardon him if he carried off the horse with the four golden shoes, from the next kingdom.

The fox gave him three grains again, for the guardroom, the stable, and the horse's stall, and warned him against the golden saddle, and that this time, the fox would not be able to help him if the boy failed in his task. When the boy saw the saddle, he reached for it, but something struck his arm, and he led out the horse without it. He confessed to the fox, who said that it had been he who had struck his arm. Returning to the princess's castle, he confessed that he would gladly take her to his father's castle on the horse, and so the fox gave him the grains again, and this time he carried the princess off. He asked the fox if he could try the bird again, and this time, he succeeded in catching the bird.

The fox then warned the boy against ransoming anyone with the money. The prince rode on and discovered that his brothers had gone into debt at the inn and were to be hanged. He paid off the debt. His brothers, jealous, threw him into a den of lions and took the bird, the horse, and the princess, threatening to kill her if she did not say they had won them. They told their father that their youngest had been hanged for debt. But the bird did not sing, the horse would let no one in the stall, and the princess wept unceasingly.

In the lions' den, the prince found the fox; the lions did not harm him, and the fox led him out, saying only that sons that would forget their father would also betray their brother. The fox asked him to cut off his head. The prince tried to refuse, but the fox insisted that he would kill the prince if he did not. The prince did, and the fox told him that he was the dead man whose debts he had paid.

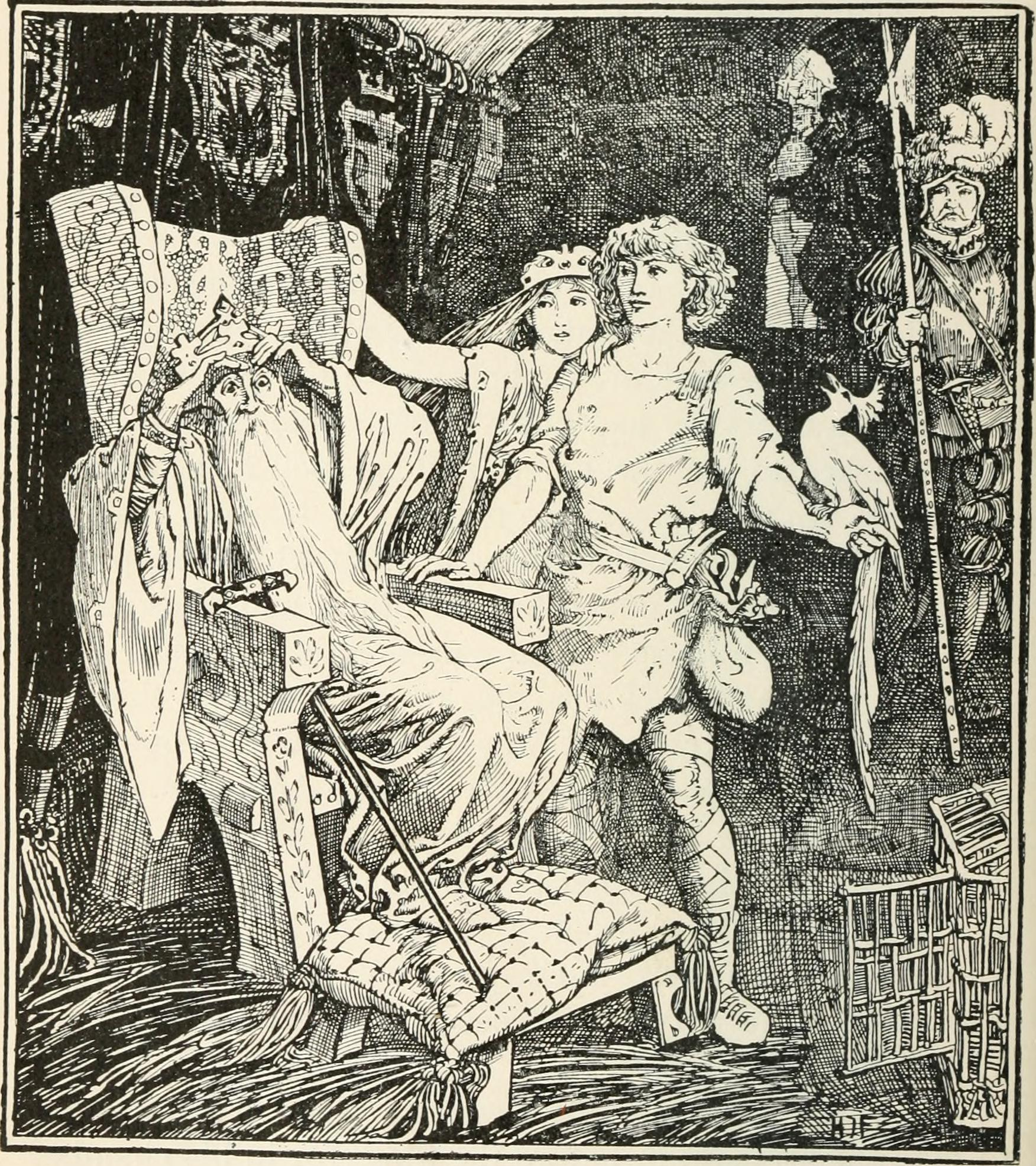
The prince brings the healing bird and the princess to his father's court. Illustration by Henry Justice Ford for Andrew Lang's The Pink Fairy Book (1897).

The prince disguised himself as a horse-shoer and went to the castle. He put shoes on the horse with four golden shoes, and hearing the bird Grip would not sing, declared that it lacked something and if he could see it, he could learn what it was. He called the bird by name. It began to sing, and caused the princess to smile. The king's sight recovered, and he recognized the horse-shoer as his youngest son. He banished the older sons, but the youngest married the princess and lived happily ever after.

== Motifs ==
While the hero in these stories is normally aided by a talking animal, for it to be a ghost is unusual. This is the grateful dead, a common folklore motif, found also in Fair Brow.

== See also ==
- The Water of Life
- The Bold Knight, the Apples of Youth, and the Water of Life
- The Golden Mermaid
- Laughing Eye and Weeping Eye
- The Little Green Frog
- The Brown Bear of the Green Glen
- The Story of Bensurdatu
- Ibong Adarna
