= The Greek Princess and the Young Gardener =

Irish fairy tale

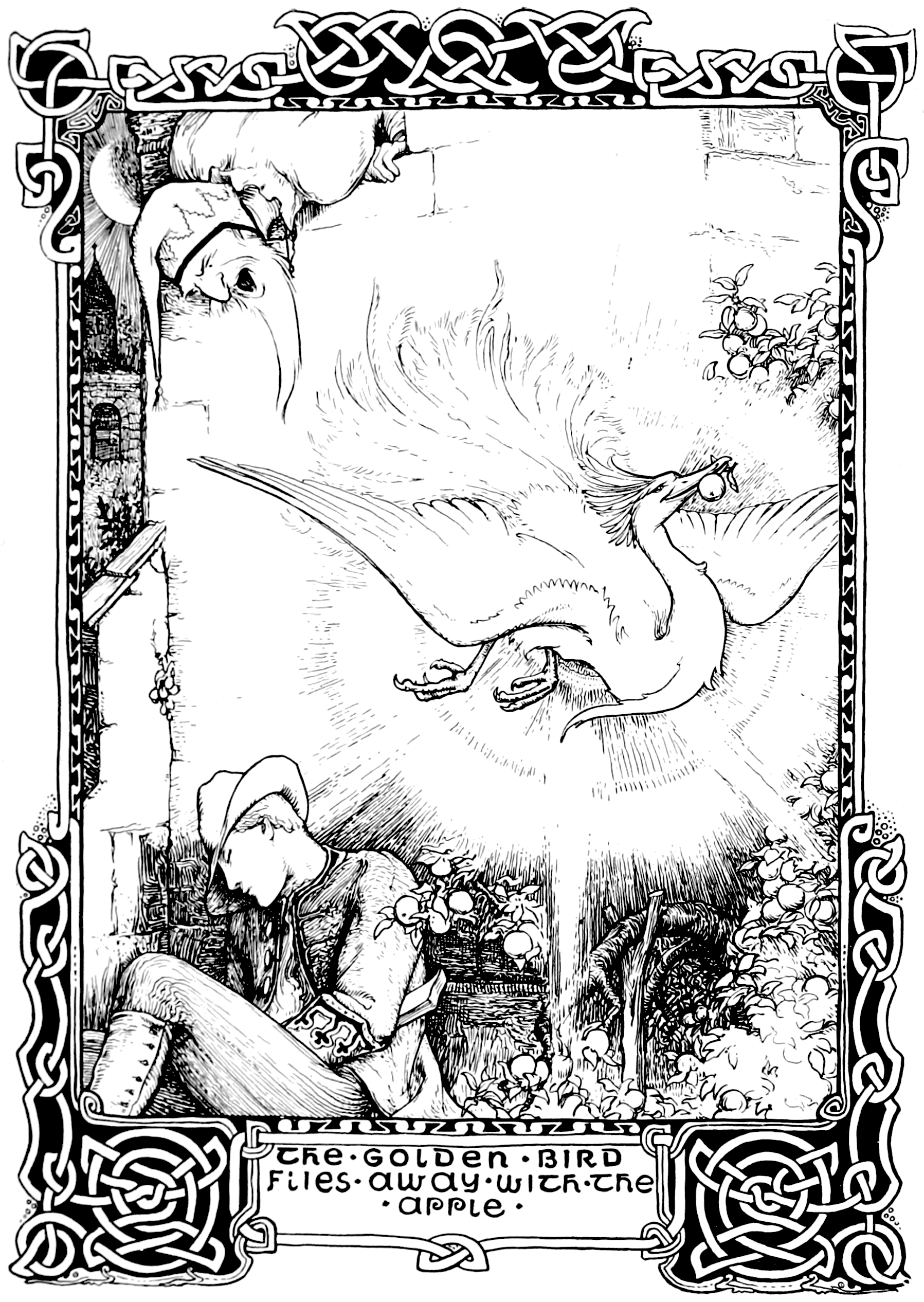
- The golden bird steals the apples under the gardener's son's watch. Frontispice illustration of More Celtic Fairy Tales by John D. Batten (1895).

Folk tale
- Name: The Greek Princess and the Young Gardener
- Aarne–Thompson grouping: ATU 550 (The Quest for the Golden Bird; The Quest for the Firebird; Bird, Horse and Princess)
- Region: Ireland
- Published in: Fireside Stories of Ireland by Patrick Kennedy (1870); More Celtic Fairy Tales by Joseph Jacobs (1895)
- Related: The Bird 'Grip'; The Golden Bird; Tsarevitch Ivan, the Fire Bird and the Gray Wolf; How Ian Direach got the Blue Falcon; The Nunda, Eater of People

The Greek Princess and the Young Gardener is an Irish fairy tale collected by Patrick Kennedy in Fireside Stories of Ireland. Joseph Jacobs included it in More Celtic Fairy Tales.

The tale is similar to Aarne-Thompson's type 550, "the quest for the golden bird/firebird", the Scottish How Ian Direach got the Blue Falcon and the German The Golden Bird . Other fairy tales of this type include The Bird 'Grip', Tsarevitch Ivan, the Fire Bird and the Gray Wolf, and The Nunda, Eater of People.

== Synopsis ==
A king with one daughter grew old and sick, but the doctors found that the best medicine for him were apples from his own orchard. One night, he saw a bird stealing them. He blamed the gardener for neglecting the orchard, and the gardener promised that his sons, the land's best archers, would stop the thieving bird. The first night the oldest son came to the garden, but fell asleep; the king saw him and the thieving bird again, and though he shouted, the boy did not wake quickly enough. The same thing happened with the second son. But on the third night, the youngest son stayed awake and shot off a feather, thus frightening the bird away.

The king admired the feather greatly and said his daughter would marry whoever brought him the bird. The gardener's oldest son set out to do it. When a fox came to beg some of his lunch, the son shot an arrow at him. There were two inns, one merry, and one quiet in which to stay and when the oldest son found the inns, he chose the merrier one, and never came out again. Soon after, the second son set out, and ended up the same.

Finally, the youngest set out. He shared his lunch with the fox and out of respect, the fox warned him against a merry inn with dancing, and to stay in a quiet inn. The youngest followed the fox's advice and stayed in the quiet inn. The next day, the fox told him the bird was at the castle of the King of Spain and carried him there. Then it said that he could go in and carry out the bird and its cage. He went in, but he saw three golden apples with the bird, and a golden cage. He went to put the bird in the golden cage, and it awoke, and the boy was captured. The king gave him one chance to save his life: to steal the King of Morocco's bay filly.

The son came out, the fox carried him to that castle, and warned him to not let the horse touch anything except the ground. He went in and saw a golden saddle. When he put it on the filly, it squealed and again he was caught. The king told him he could have his life and the filly if he brought him Princess Golden Locks, the daughter of the Greek King.

The fox carried him to that castle and warned him how to answer when asked a favor. He found the princess and woke her, asking her to let him take her with her, and promising to free her from the King of Morocco. She asked to say goodbye to her father; he refused; she asked to kiss him instead, and the boy agreed, but that awoke the king. He said that if the boy removed a great heap of clay, enchanted so that for every shovel thrown away, two came back, he would believe that he could keep her from the king. The boy tried, but the heap grew larger. The fox told him to eat and rest. He confessed to the king and princess his failure, and the princess hoped he did not fail. The king let him take her, though he lamented being alone, as the princess's brother was kept captive by a witch.

The fox carried them to the King of Morocco, and the boy asked to shake hands with the princess before he left. When the king agreed, he carried her off on the bay filly. Then he brought the bay filly to the King of Spain, leaving the princess with the fox, but when the king gave him the bird and the golden apples, he stroked the horse as a fine beast, and when he was done, he rode away with both the horse and the bird.

They rescued his brothers, who were begging, and the fox asked the boy to cut off his head and tail. The boy could not do it, but his oldest brother did it for him, and the fox became the prince, the princess's brother. He married the king's daughter, and the gardener's son married his sister.

== Analysis ==
=== Tale type ===
The is classified in the international Aarne-Thompson-Uther Index as tale type ATU 550, "Bird, Horse and Princess" (previously, "The Quest for the Golden Bird").

Folklorist Joseph Jacobs noted in his notes that the story was "clearly that of the Grimms' Golden Bird", and suggested as an early parallel the Arthurian romance of Walewein.

=== Combinations ===
Irish scholarship points out that type ATU 550, "Bird, Horse and Princess", appears combined with tale type ATU 329, "Hiding from the Princess", in Irish tradition.

== Variants ==
In an Irish tale published by Jeremiah Curtin with the title The Bird of the Golden Land, the king sets his sons on the quest for the titular bird, and whoever brings it with him shall have the crown. The three brothers arrive at a house of an old man, who gives a sledge to the oldest prince, a rope to the second and a cradle to the youngest. He also directs them to a secret underground passage that leads to the Golden Land. The youngest descends on the cradle and arrives at the hut of an old woman, who seems to know the reason for his quest. She directs him to a stable, where he finds a mare that can take him across seas and to the King of the Golden Land. After he meets the King, His Majesty proposes a challenge: the king will hide three times in different locations, and thrice the prince must find him (which he does, by accident). Secondly, the prince must hide and the king must look for him (which the prince accomplishes with the help of the mare). (Note: This sequence is classified as tale type ATU 329, "Hiding from the Princess (Devil)": hero has to hide three times, and the princess has to look for him.) After the youngest prince returns with the Bird of the Golden Land to the hut of the old woman, she reveals she is a queen, the mare is another queen and the Bird itself is a third queen.

== See also ==
- Prâslea the Brave and the Golden Apples
- The Golden Mermaid
