= How Ian Dìreach got the Blue Falcon =

Scottish fairy tale

How Ian Dìreach got the Blue Falcon (Scottish Gaelic: Sgeulachd Mic Iain Dìrich) is a Scottish fairy tale, collected by John Francis Campbell in Popular Tales of the West Highlands. He recorded it from a quarryman in Knockderry, Roseneath, named Angus Campbell.

Andrew Lang included it in The Orange Fairy Book.

== Publication ==
The tale was republished as The Adventures of Iain Direach, Prince Ian Direach and His Quest, and Prince Iain. The tale was also translated into German as Mac Iain Direach and into Irish as An Seabhac Gorm (The Blue Falcon).

== Synopsis ==
A king and a queen had a son, Ian. When Ian was almost grown to a man, his mother died, and his father remarried. One day Ian went hunting and shot at a blue falcon, knocking off a feather. His stepmother cursed him until he found her the falcon. He cursed her to stand with one foot on the great hall and the other on the castle, and always face the wind, until he returned, and left.

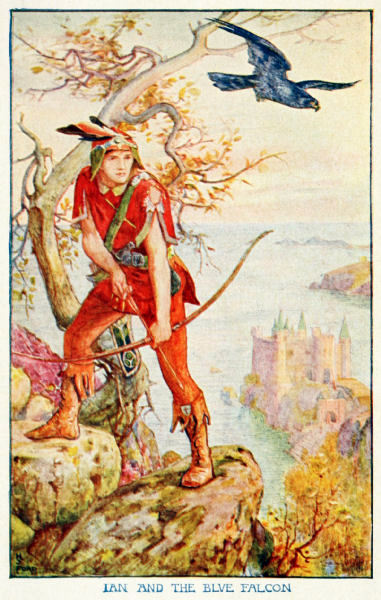
Ian has the Blue Falcon on his sights. Illustration by Henry Justice Ford for Andrew Lang's The Orange Fairy Book (1906).

He met with Gille Mairtean the fox, who tells him that the blue falcon is kept by the Giant of the Five Heads, and the Five Necks, and the Five Humps, and to seek service there tending animals. If he, above all, treats the birds kindly, the giant will let him care for the blue falcon, and then he can steal it, if he does not let any of its feathers touch anything in the house. In time the giant trusted him, but the falcon started by the doorpost, and the feather touching the post made it scream and brought back the giant. The giant tells him he may have the falcon if he brings him the White Sword of Light, owned by the Big Women of Dhiurradh.

Gille Mairtean turned himself into a boat and carried Ian to the island of Dhiurradh, and told him to seek service there, polishing gold and silver, which will let him, in time, steal the sword, but he must not let its sheath touch anything within the house. This succeeded until the tip of the sheath touched the doorpost, and it shrieked. The Big Women told him he may have the sword if he brings them the bay colt of the King of Erin.

Gille Mairtean turned himself into a boat, and carried Ian to the castle, where he served in the stable until he had a chance to steal the colt, which swished its tail against the door, and the king told him he must bring him the daughter of the king of the Franks.

Gille Mairtean turned himself into a boat and carried him to France. The boat ran himself into the cleft of a rock, and sent Ian to say he had been shipwrecked. The royal court came down to see the boat, and music came out of it. The princess said she must see the harp that played such music, and Ian and Gille Mairtean carried her off. She was angry, he explained why he needed to carry her off, and she said she would rather marry him.

They returned to the king, and Gille turned himself into a beautiful woman, and had Ian give him instead of the princess. After Ian received the bay colt, Gille bit the king, knocking him unconscious, and escaped, and they returned to the Big Women. Gille turned himself into a bay colt, and after Ian received the sword, threw it at all the Big Women, killing them. They returned to the giant, and Gille turned himself into a sword and, once Ian had received the blue falcon, cut off the giant's heads.

Gille warned Ian how to carry what he had brought back to the castle, to prevent his stepmother turning him into a bundle of sticks. He obeyed, and his stepmother was turned into a bundle of sticks herself. So Ian burned her, married the princess, and lived ever afterwards in friendship with Gille Mairtean the fox.

== Analysis ==
=== Tale type ===
The tale is classified in the international Aarne-Thompson-Uther Index as type ATU 550, "Bird, Horse and Princess" (formerly, "The Search for the Golden Bird"), the same classification as German The Golden Bird.

Scottish literary critic W. P. Ker compared the tale to the medieval Dutch romance of Roman van Walewein (Gawain), since both stories are characterized by a hero taking part in a chain of quests.

=== Motifs ===
Folklorist Patrick Kennedy stated, on his notes to the Irish tale The Greek Princess and the Young Gardener, that the quest for the bird with the help of an animal "occurs in Mac Iain Direach ('Son of John the Upright')".

Alan Bruford argued that the name of the hero was a corruption of literary name Mac an Dìthreabhaich.

== Variants ==
=== Europe ===
==== Scotland ====
Campbell published another variant, titled An Sionnach or The Fox, from a man named Jon the tinker, in 1859. In this tale, Brian, the son of the King of Greece, in order to marry the hen's wife, must quest for "the most marvellous bird" in the world, the White Glaive of Light and the Sun Goddess (named Dia Greine), "daughter of the king of the gathering of Fionn". He is helped in his tasks by a fox, which is the Sun Goddess's brother transformed. Campbell, in his commentary to the variant, noted that this Scottish tale was "the same legend" as the German tale The Golden Bird, by the Brothers Grimm.

Francis Hindes Groome republished the tale The Fox in his book Gypsy Folk-Tales.

==== Ireland ====
Author Seumas MacManus published an Irish variant in his work Donegal Wonder Book. In this tale, titled The Hound of the Hill of Spears, prince Owen is fond of fowling, and finds the feathers of a Blue Hawk. His new step-mother, who hates him, knows that the bird belongs to the Giant of the Seven Heads and Seven Trunks, and casts a geasa on Owen to not return home until he brings the Blue Hawk of Connaught. On his journey, he shares his food with a white hound that introduces himself as the White Hound of the Hill of Spears. With the hound's help, Owen takes part in a chain of quests for the Blue Hawk of Connaught, the Sword of Light from the King of Denmark, the Steed of Bells from the King of Spain, and the beautiful princess Starlight, daughter of the King of Greece. In order to trick the owners of the treasures, the White Hound shapeshifts into the princess, the steed, the sword and the hawk.

=== Americas ===
==== Canada ====
Folklorist Helen Creighton collected a tale from a teller named Wilmot Macdonald, from Newcastle, New Brunswick. In his story, titled The Sword of Brightness, an old man has a farm and three sons. He plans to give the farm to anyone that can bring the Sword of Brightness from an old king. The elder two take up on their father's offer, and so does the youngest son, whom the elder two dismiss as unintelligent. They ride together and stop just before two hotels, the first with a placard reading "to pay nothing", and the second with a placard reading "pay what you can". The elder two go to the first hotel, while the youngest spends the night in the second hotel. He helps an old man in the second hotel and has breakfast with him. The next day, the old man tells the youth to fetch some red cow's straw in the barn and an egg a white hen laid the night before since they might be useful for him. Before he leaves, the man also gives him a book that will help the youth if he ever gets stuck on his quest. He arrives at the old king's castle and reads in the book he must not place the Sword of Brightness in the silver scabbard, nor in the golden one. He takes the sword and the silver scabbard, which sounds the alarm bells to alert the king. The king appears to him and makes a deal: he will give him the sword if the boy fetches for him a golden fruit from the tree that belongs to the giants. He agrees to the deal and goes to the giants' kingdom to steal a fruit, but is found out by the giants. The creatures demand in return he retrieves them a girl they chained to a rock, since she also came for the fruits. The youth goes to the rocks, places an egg on his head, changes into a bird and flies to the rocks to release the girl. The youth takes the girl, the golden fruit and the Sword of Brightness with him and returns home. Next to the road home, he falls asleep. His elder brothers seize the opportunity to steal the girl and the sword and take the credit for the quest.

== See also ==
- "The Sister of the Sun"
- "The Golden Bird"
- "The Greek Princess and the Young Gardener"
- "Laughing Eye and Weeping Eye"
- "The Bird 'Grip'"
- "The Little Green Frog"
- "The Golden Mermaid"
- "Tsarevitch Ivan, the Firebird and the Gray Wolf"
- "The Firebird and Princess Vasilisa"
