= The Nunda, Eater of People =

Abridged version of a Swahili fairy tale

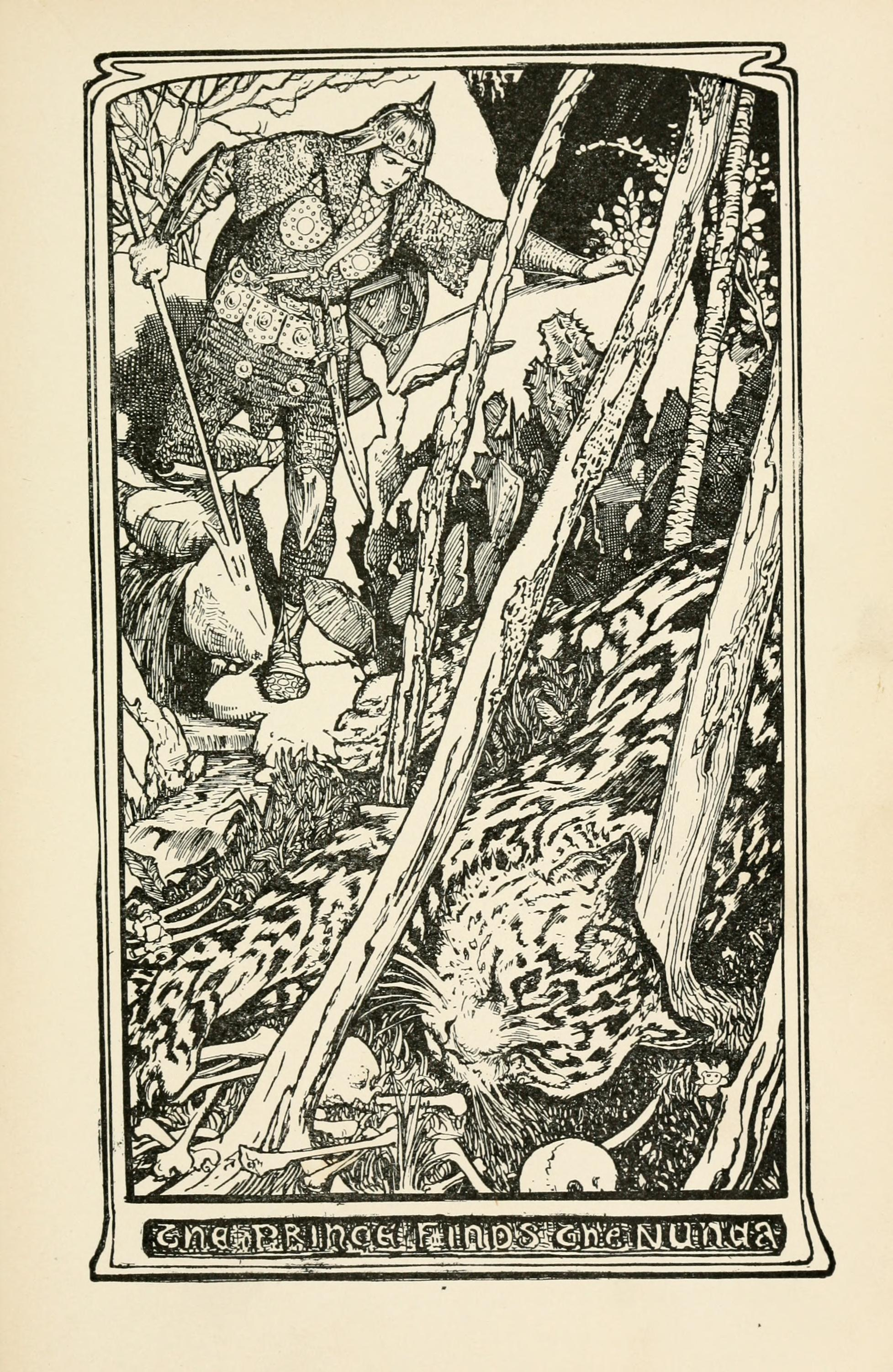
Illustration from Andrew Lang's Fairy Books

The Nunda, Eater of People is an abridged version of a Swahili fairy tale titled "Sultan Majnun" (Sultani Majinuni), collected by Edward Steere (1828–1882) in Swahili Tales, as told by natives of Zanzibar (1870). Andrew Lang included it in The Violet Fairy Book (1901).

It is Aarne-Thompson type 550, the quest for the golden bird/firebird.

== Synopsis ==
A Sultan was very proud of his garden and of six of his seven sons, but he scorned the youngest son as weak. One day, he saw that his date tree was ready to fruit; he sent his oldest sons to watch it, or the slaves would steal the fruit and he would have none for many a year. The son had his slaves beat drums to keep him awake, but when it grew light they slept and a bird ate all the dates. Every year after that, he set a different son and finally two sons but for five years the bird ate the dates. The sixth year, he sent a man of his. His youngest son asked why he did not send him. Finally the father agreed. The youngest went, sent his slaves home and slept until early. Then he sat with corn in one hand and sand in the other. He chewed on the corn until he grew sleepy and then he put sand in his mouth, which kept him awake.

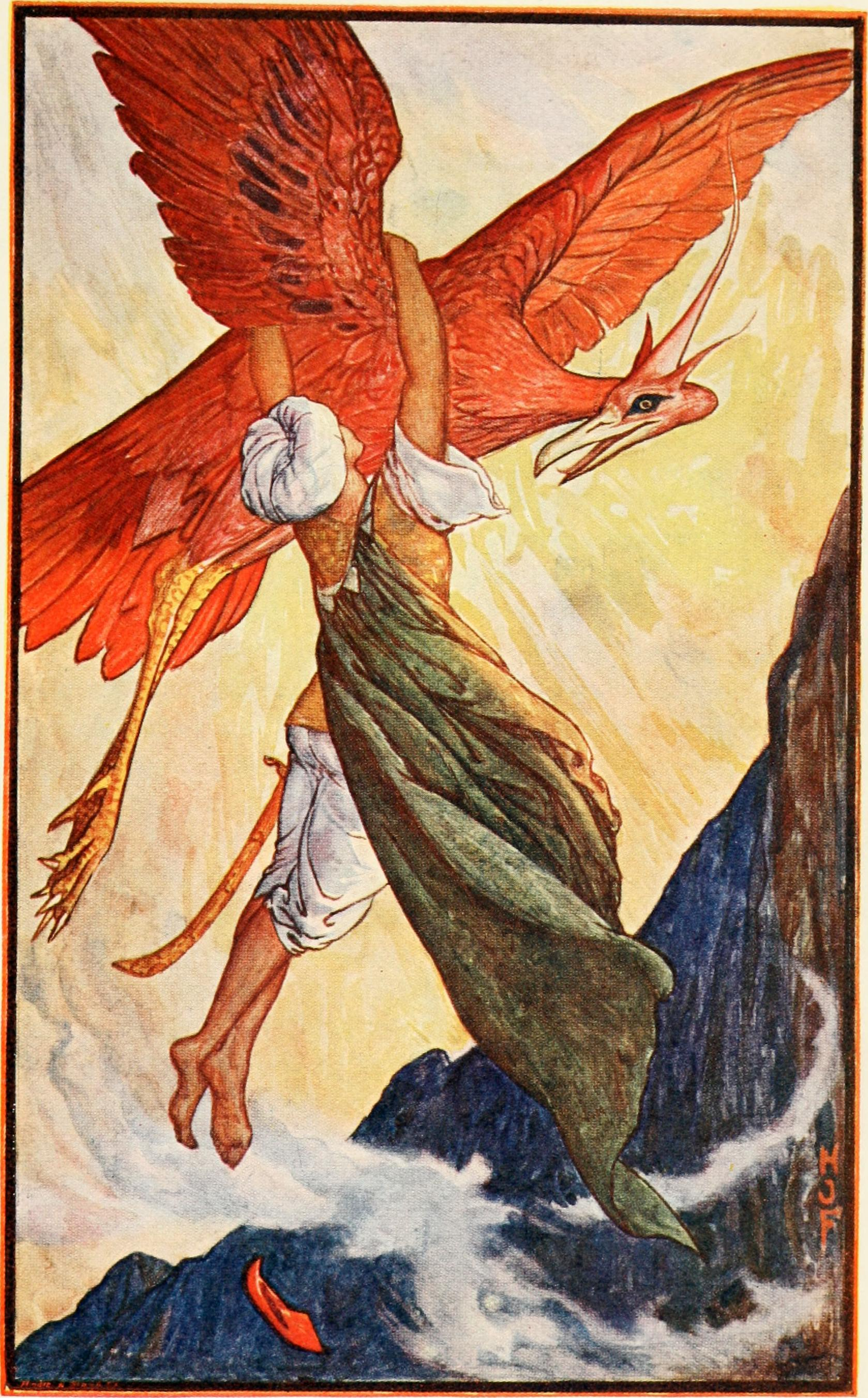
The prince holds on to the giant bird. Illustration by Henry Justice Ford for Andrew Lang's The Violet Fairy Book (1901).

The bird arrived. He grabbed it. It flew off with him, but he did not let go, even when it threatened him. In return for its freedom, the bird gave him a feather and said if the son put it in a fire, the bird would come wherever he was. The son returned, and the dates were still there. There was much rejoicing.

One day, the sultan's cat caught a calf and the sultan refused compensation on the grounds that technically he owned both. The next day it caught a cow, and then a donkey, a horse, and a child and then a man. Finally it lived in a thicket and ate whatever went by but the sultan would still not entertain any complaints. One day, the sultan went out to see the harvest with his six sons and the cat sprang out and killed three. The sultan demanded its death, admitting it was a demon.

Against his desperate parent's wishes, the youngest son set out after the cat, which was called "The Nunda (Eater of People)" and could not find it for many days. Finally, he and his slaves tracked it over a mountain, through a great forest. The prince and slaves threw spears into it and ran away. The next day they carried it back to the town. The people and Sultan rejoiced because they had been delivered from the bondage of fear.

== Versions ==
=== First part ===
Olga Töppen published a version of the first part of the story as Der Dattelbaum ("The Date Tree"), wherein a king has a date tree in his garden that is mysteriously attacked at night, and he orders his sons to stand guard. At the end of the tale, the king's youngest son discovers a bird coming to steal the dates.

=== Second part ===
The tale was also collected in Zanzibar by George Bateman, with the name Mkaaah Jeechonee, the Boy Hunter: his father is Sultan Maaj'noon and the huge cat is called Noondah. This version skips the episode with the bird and focuses on the hunt for the king's giant feline.

Another translation of the tale was Nunda the Slayer and the origin of the One-Eyed, published by Chauncey Hugh Stigand and sourced from the Swahili language. This version lacks the introductory part with the bird and begins with the Sultan feeding his pet cat until he grows large enough.

German linguist Carl Velten collected a version of the second part of the story, titled Hadisi ya nunda, which he translated to German as Geschichte der bösen nunda ("Tale of the Evil Nunda"). In this tale, a king orders his soldiers to find meat for his pet creature, which he feeds until it grows large enough.

== Analysis ==
=== Tale type ===
The first part of the tale is classified in the international Aarne-Thompson-Uther Index as tale type ATU 550, "Bird, Horse, and Princess", or, previously, "The quest for the Golden Bird". The second part of the tale involves motif B.11.2.3.1, "The monster that devours everything".

The second part of the tale sometimes exists as an independent story, such as the version Hadisi ya nunda, collected and published by German linguist Carl Velten. In this regard, Noël J. Gueunier and Madjidhoubi Said noted that the story of "Le Monstre dévorant" ("Swallowing Monster") is spread across Africa, "particularly" in the Bantu-speaking areas and in the Malagasy regions.

=== Motifs ===
==== The Nunda monster ====
Professor Alice Werner suggested the first part of the tale might have been a foreign importation. In regards to the Nunda (es), she compared it to a series of stories from other African peoples about "The Swallowing Monster" that grows larger with each thing it devours and/or is capable of eating entire villages. The word nunda is also said to mean 'fierce animal', 'cruel man' or 'something heavy'.

The Nunda is also known as Mngwa, from the Swahili mu-nwga ('strange one') . It appears to be a creature of large size, possibly a giant cat.

According to Carl Velten, the word nunda or mnunda is a Swahili term for a bloodthirsty monster or person.

Scholars Noël J. Gueunier and Madjidhoubi Said noted that "Le Monstre dévorant" ("Swallowing Monster") is a normal domestic animal at first, like a rooster or a kitten, that the king either finds in the forest or raises until it grows large enough to start devouring entire villages in the kingdom.

==== Other motifs ====
Edward Steere noted the resemblance of the hero's name, Sit-in-the-kitchen, with Cinderella, another folktale character that sits in the ashes.

== See also ==
- Tsarevitch Ivan, the Fire Bird and the Gray Wolf
- The Nine Peahens and the Golden Apples
- The Golden Mermaid
- The Golden Bird
- Simurgh
