= Kotyhoroshko =

Ukrainian and Eastern European fairy tale

Kotyhoroshko (Ukrainian: Котигорошко), also Kotygoroshko, is the hero of the Eastern European folk tale of Ukrainian origin of the same name, centered around a boy of extraordinary strength who was born from a pea and freed his own brothers and sisters from the captivity of a serpent.

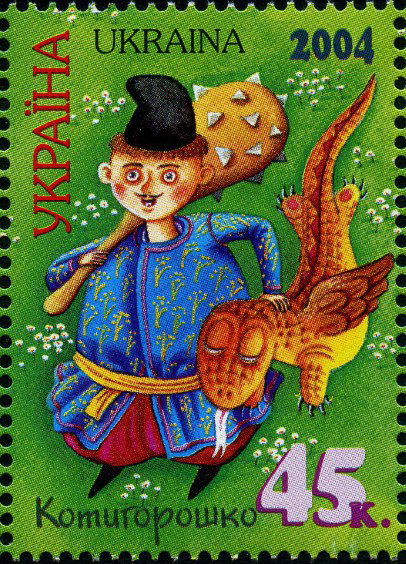
Stamp of Ukraine featuring Kotyhoroshko, 2004

== Name and origin ==
The name Kotyhoroshko is related to peas, a leguminous crop that has been grown since the Chalcolithic period by the peoples who inhabited Eastern Asia, the coastal lands of the Mediterranean and Black seas. Peas were considered a sign of life-giving force in agricultural societies: yield, fertility of livestock and prosperity of the land owner. In particular, among the Slavs, peas were an integral part of the Christmas table and marriage customs associated with the birth of children.

The image of the hero Kotyhoroshko, as it is believed in modern folklore, goes back to the initial Indo-European mythological tale about a hero born by a good miracle, who frees a kidnapped girl with the help of a powerful weapon. The epic Ramayana (Indra's liberation of his wife Sita from Ravana's captivity) and fairy tales such as "Bukh Kopytovych" or "Suchenko" are based on the same content.

The Russian historian, Borys Rybakov, considered the fairy tale Kotyhoroshko as a late Neolithic mythologeme about the journey of a magician to the afterlife to liberate the souls of the dead.

Ukrainian folklorist Viktor Davidyuk considered Kotyhoroshko as the embodiment of the collective strength of his brothers, who were captured by a snake or serpent. Therefore, Kotyhoroshko shows extraordinary strength even before passing the main test. Peas in this case symbolize the embodiment of the human essence in other forms.

== Kotyhoroshko in fairy tales ==
=== Main plot ===
A father sends his six sons to plow the field, and his daughter to bring them lunch. The daughter then looks for the brothers, following the furrow plowed by them, but the serpent tricks her by making his own furrow to lure her to him and imprison her. When the brothers go to free her, the serpent challenges them to a battle. The serpent defeats all six sons and imprisons them also.

Now without children, their mother eats a pea that rolled by, after which she gives birth to a son, whom she calls Kotyhoroshko (Котигорошко or "Rolling Pea"). The boy grows quickly, becomes extremely strong and digs a hole to obtain a piece of iron. After that, he asks his parents where his brothers and sister are. They dissuade him from searching, but Kotyhoroshko takes the iron to the blacksmith to make a weapon to fight against the snake. The blacksmith forges a mace, and Kotyhoroshko tosses it twice, testing its strength. The first version breaks from falling, and the second version bends. Taking the final mace, Kotyhoroshko proceeds to the snake's lair.

Hiding in the snake's dwelling, Kotyhoroshko is waiting for the snake. When the snake dies, Kotyhoroshko takes the snake's treasures and frees the prisoners, but does not reveal that he is their brother. On the way home, Kotyhoroshko falls asleep, and the brothers plan to tie Kotyhoroshko face down to an oak tree and tell their parents that they alone defeated the snake. Arriving home, the brothers learn from their parents about Kotyhoroshko. Meanwhile, Kotyhoroshko uproots the oak tree and throws it into the house. After that Kotyhoroshko leaves.

While traveling the world, Kotyhoroshko meets three men with unusual powers: Vernyhora (Вернигору or 'flips mountains' ), Vernydub (Вернидуба or 'flips oaks' ) and Krutyvus (Крутивуса or 'crooked mustache'). Vernihora can move mountains, Vernydub can uproot oak trees with his bare hands, and Krutyvus can make waters part. The four of them reach an empty cabin in the forest, where they stop for the night.

In the next three days, three go hunting, while a different one each day stays in the hut to guard and cook food. Repeatedly, a small but powerful old man (grandfather) comes with demands to each of the three men standing watch in their turn. When Vernyhora, Vernydub, and Krutyvus each in turn treat the grandfather disrespectfully, the grandfather hangs each one guarding on a nail, eats everything prepared and leaves. None of the three men admit this, and tell the others that they fell asleep and did not have time to prepare food. On the fourth day, Kotyhoroshko himself remains in the hut. Kotyhoroshko puts the old man outside, but the old man tries to hang Kotyhoroshko in the same way. Kotyhoroshko pinches the old man's beard in an oak tree. The old man then pulls the oak tree from the ground and runs away.

Their trail leads to a pit into which Vernyhora, Vernydub and Krutyvus are afraid to go. They decide to knit ropes on which Kotyhoroshko descends into the pit. At the bottom there is a palace and a princess, who dissuades Kotyhoroshko from fighting with the old man. Kotyhoroshko still fights the old man, kills him and takes the treasures together with the princess. Kotyhoroshko's friends pull out three bags of jewels and the princess's robe to the surface, and they decide to throw Kotyhoroshko down. Kotyhoroshko ties a stone to the rope instead of himself and when it is dropped, remains unharmed.

Inside the pit, Kotyhoroshko protects some chicks from a thunderstorm. When a bird flies in and asks who covered them from the rain, the chicks point to Kotyhoroshko. The bird promises to fulfill his wish for this, and he wishes to fly to the surface. During the flight of the bird, the bird asks for six pieces of meat and water to feed it. There is not enough meat, so Kotyhoroshko cuts off his calf and gives it to the bird. After learning what Kotyhoroshko gave her, the bird regurgitates the calf and brings living water. Sprinkled with water, the calf grows in its place.

After getting out of the pit, Kotyhoroshko looks for Vernyhora, Vernydub and Krutyvus. He punishes them and marries the princess.

In the Ukrainian version of the tale, the grandfather not only hangs the guards on nails, but also cuts a belt from the leather on the back of each; the bird is described sometimes as the mother of chicks; Kotyhoroshko forgives his betraying friends.

== Interpretation of the content of the fairy tale ==
According to ethnologists, the plot of the liberation of the brothers from the serpent's captivity reflects the liberation from foreign oppression. The motive of abducting the bride is considered to be a reflection of the original customs of transferring her from her parents' lineage to her own. At the same time, the boy can find a bride in a different family, where he was brought up. The struggle with the bride's guards is an allegory of the magical struggle with the totem of the family. This also includes the original rite of killing the king (or a person representing him), necessary for marrying his daughter and inheriting the throne.

Ukrainian folklorist Lidia Dunaevska noted that the fairy tale "Kotyhoroshko" depicts the hero's initiation, and according to an atypical structure. Usually, the old man or grandfather, who represents the ancestor, must help the hero for showing kindness. But here it happens at the end, when Kotyhoroshko sacrifices a calf to a bird. Kotyhoroshko has the characteristics of a hero, which he acquires after the fight with the snake, and which takes place in a liminal space (where there is uncertainty). Having overcome the snake, the hero gets rid of uncertainty about his fate and leaves the everyday world for further exploits, unlike his brothers, who do not fight with the snake.

According to Viktor Davydyuk, Kotyhoroshko belongs to the same line of fairytale heroes as Ivan the Son of Man and Ivan Pobyvan. They are united by the acquisition of invulnerability after being hit by an opponent. Viktor Davydyuk interpreted this as the use of wisdom to counteract physical force. The hero knows that he needs the snake strike to gain power. Kotyhoroshko deliberately allows him to strike the first blow in order to go beyond ordinary time and space, to become eternal and immortal. Similarly, the weakness of friends in front of the old man and their betrayal serves as a warning for Kotyhoroshko himself.

== Image in culture ==
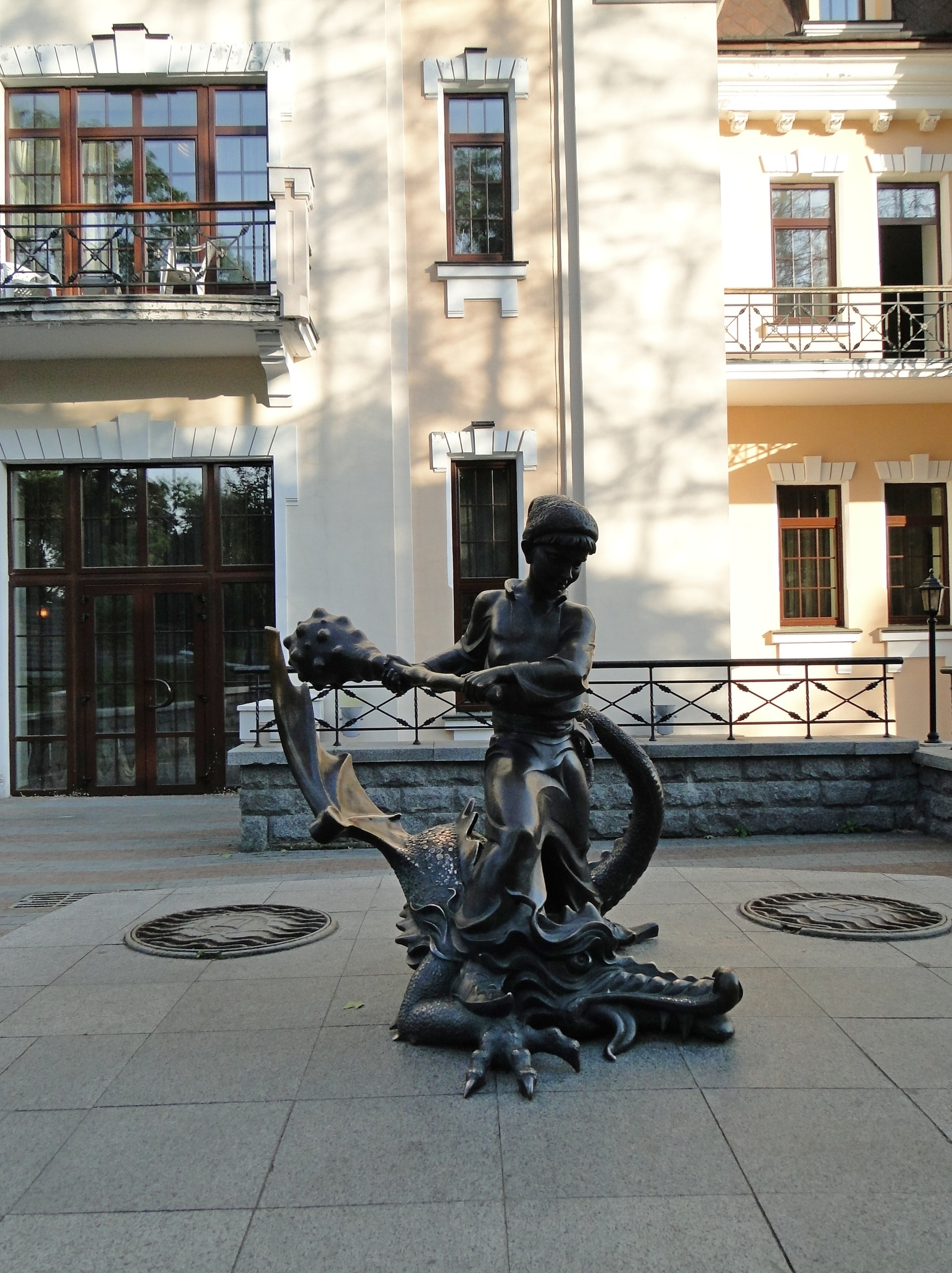
Statue of Kotyhoroshko, Kyiv Academic Puppet Theater

=== Cartoons ===
- 1970 — "Kotyhoroshko" ("Котигорошко", Kyivnaukfilm). Director: Boris Hranevich. Production designer: Yuriy Skirda.
- 2008 — "Magic pea" ("чарівний горох"). Director: Rudenko-Shvedova Yaroslava Yuriivna . Production designer: Eduard Kirich.
- 2013 — "Adventures of Kotyhoroshka and his friends" (Ukrainian: "Пригоди Котигорошка та його друзів", Ukranimafilm). Director: Rudenko-Shvedova Yaroslava Yuriivna . Production designer: Eduard Kirich.

=== Movies ===
- 1960 - family fantasy film entitled Letayushchiy korabl.

=== Books ===
- The story of Kotyhoroshko has been translated into Japanese.

=== Plays ===
- Ukrainian play of the same name by Anatoly Shiyan (b. April 5, 1906, Borysovka - d. May 6, 1989, Kyiv)

=== Ballet ===
- A one-act ballet choreographed by Roman Mykyta and originally performed by the Ballet Theatre of Maryland in January, 2023 in Largo, Maryland.

=== Stories ===
- In Vsevolod Nestayko's story "In the Land of the Sunny Bunnies", one of the residents of the Palace of Magical Tales fought with snakes during the release of negative characters by Mr. Morok.

== Other ==
- Kotyhoroshko is a Ukrainian surname.
- Ivan Kotyhoroshko is a heroic character in Mykhailo Kotsyubynskyi's story "At a High Price".
- Vasyl Kozhelyanko's fantasy novel "Kotyhoroshko" (2000). The main character is Vyshneslav Kotygoroshko.

== See also ==
- Ukrainian Fairy Tale
- Category: Ukrainian Fairy Tales
- Ukrainian Animation
- Ukrainian Folklore

For tales about wild men and strong heroes:

- The Adventures of Massang (Kalmyk folktale)
- Bear's Son Tale
- Basajaun
- Fehérlófia (Hungarian folk tale)
- Jean de l'Ours
- The Son of a Horse (Chinese folktale)
- Waligóra and Wyrwidąb ("Mountain Beater" and "Oak Tearer"), legendary Polish heroes
- Gorynya, Dubynya and Usynya
- Wild men

For other tales about rescuing princesses in the underworld:

- Dawn, Midnight and Twilight
- Prâslea the Brave and the Golden Apples
- The Gnome (fairy tale)
- The Story of Bensurdatu
- The Norka
- Jihaguk daejeok toechi seolhwa
