= Jean de l'Ours =

Character in Jean de l'Ours

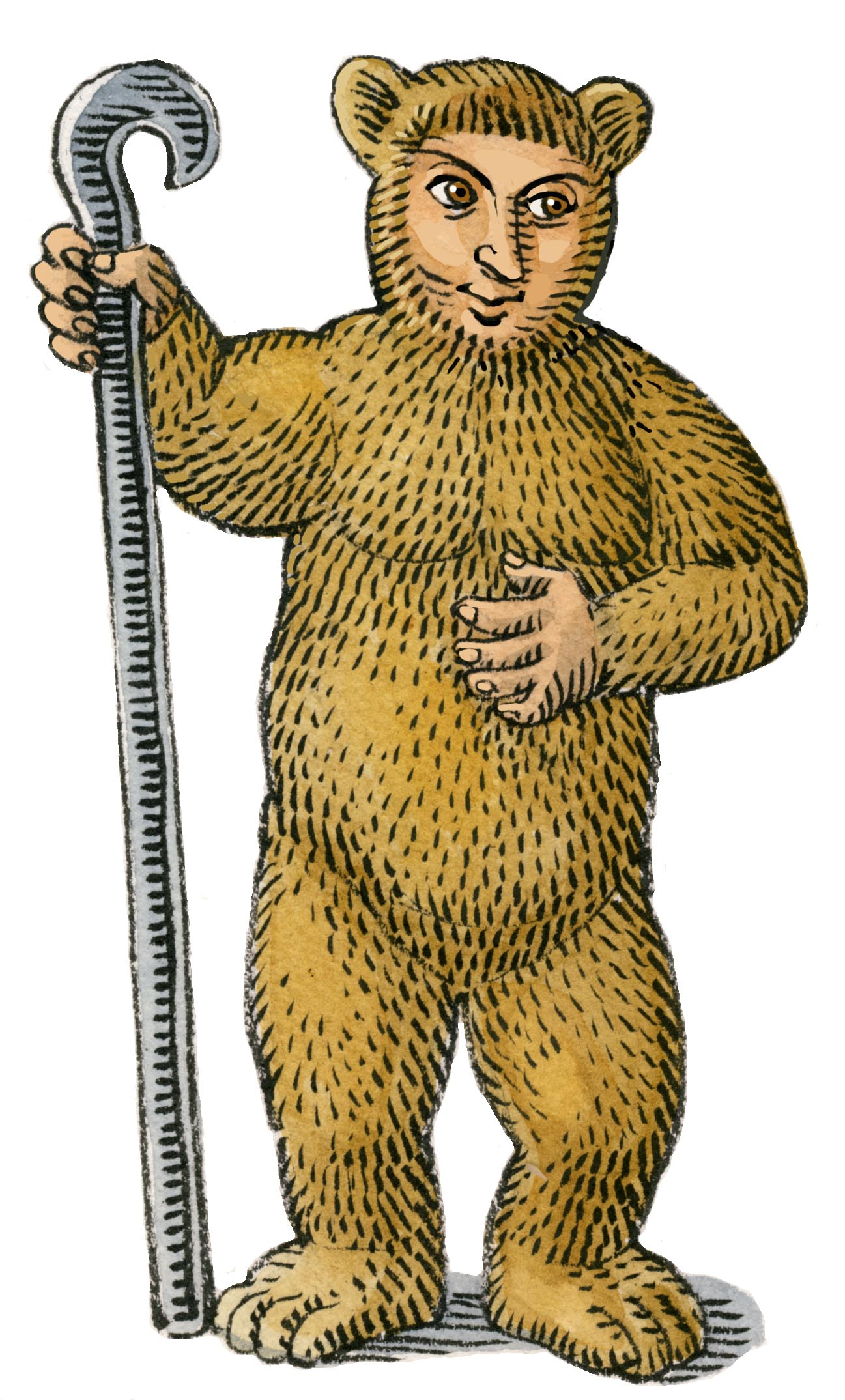
Jean de l'Ours. An artist's visualization with bear's ears. (Note: Cf. Jean-Claude Pertuzé's illustrations which depict Jean de l'ours with bear's ears.)

Jean de l'Ours (French pronunciation: [ʒɑ̃ də luʁs]) (Note: Note that final s is pronounced.) or John the Bear, John of the Bear, John-of-the-Bear, John Bear, is the leading character in the French folktale Jean de l'Ours classed as Type 301B (Note: However, the third revision of the Aarne-Thompson classification system, made in 2004 by German folklorist Hans-Jörg Uther, subsumed both subtypes AaTh 301A and AaTh 301B into the new type ATU 301.) in the Aarne–Thompson system; it can also denote any tale of this type.

Some typical elements are that the hero is born half-bear, half-human; he obtains a weapon, usually a heavy iron cane, and on his journey; he bands up with two or three companions. At a castle the hero defeats an adversary, pursues him to a hole, discovers an underworld, and rescues three princesses. The companions abandon him in the hole, taking the princesses for themselves. The hero escapes, finds the companions and gets rid of them. He marries the most beautiful princess of the three, but not before going through certain ordeal(s) by the king.

The character is said to be one of "the most popular tale-types in Hispanic and Francophone tradition". Numerous variants exist in France, often retaining the name Jean de l'Ours or something similar for the hero. Some of the analogues in Europe that retain the names corresponding to "John" are: Jan de l'Ors (Occitan: [ˈdʒan de ˈluɾs]); Joan de l'Ós (Catalan: [ʒuˈan də ˈlɔs] or [dʒoˈan də ˈlɔs]); Juan del Oso, Juan el Oso, Juanito el Oso, Juanillo el Oso (Spanish: [ˈxwan (d)el ˈoso], [xwaˈnito el ˈoso; -niʎo]); Giovanni dell'Orso (Italian: [dʒoˈvanni delˈlorso]), Iann he vaz houarn (Breton); (Note: French translation: Jean à la barre en fer, i.e. "John with the iron stick".) Ivashko Medvedko (Russian). The tale has also propagated to the New World, with examples from French Canada, Mexico, etc.

== Physical appearance ==
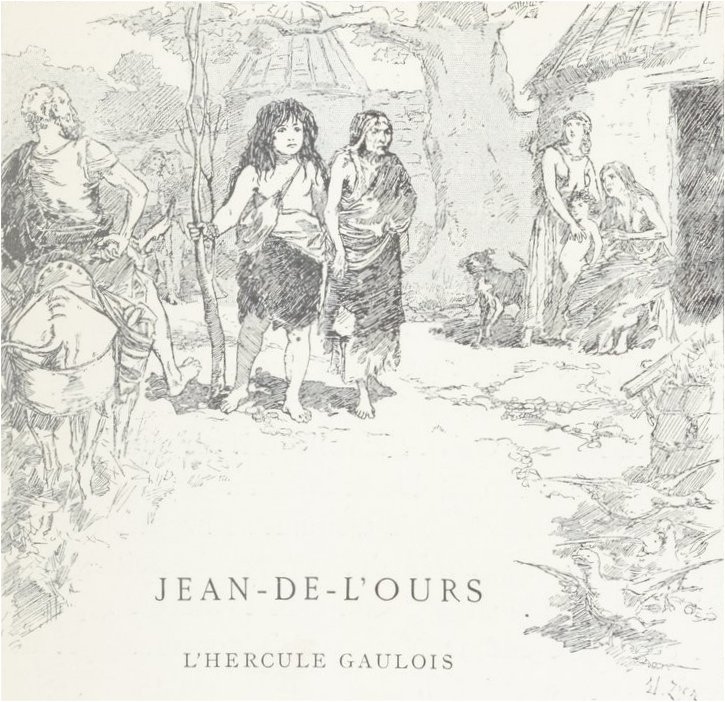
Jean-de-l'Ours as a child, here a foundling adopted by a widow abducted by a bear. —illustration by Édouard Zier.

Several French versions explicitly comment on Jean de l'ours being covered with body hair on his entire body. One Gascon version, Jan l'Oursét adds that he had "a large head just like a bear's, except for its shape".

The hero is human from the waist up and bear from the waist down in one Mexican version (Juan el Oso) as well as the Russian tale "Ivanko Medv(i)edko" (or "Ivanko the Bear's son"). For comparison, in the Avar tale "Bear's Ear", the protagonist has ears like a bear.

Jean de l'Ours is a beautiful abandoned child raised by a mother bear in Henri Carnoy's version (1885). Along the same vein, Jean de l'Ours was a beautiful foundling adopted by a widow according to Carnoy in another version (1885, illustrated by Édouard Zier), but this, except for an altered telling of the boy's origin, is by and large identical to the tale given earlier by Hippolyte Babou (1862): (Note: In Babou's version, a widow is abducted by a bear who makes the sign of the cross, and she stays with the bear. She returns a year later with a 3-month old as large as she.) In both texts he is depicted as an angel-faced, blue-eyed boy who wears a bearskin around his loins, has a lush mane like Samson's falling from head to chest, and carries a poplar sapling as a staff.

The artist's depiction by Jean-Claude Pertuzé in his Le conte de Jean de l'ours (1988) depicts Jean with rounded bear's ears attached high on his head.

== Tale type ==
"John the Bear" is categorized as Type 301 or "Three Stolen Princesses" type. (Note: The "Three Stolen Princesses" is something of an official title, published in Aarne-Thompson Types (1961) and Uther's Types (2004).) Type 301 is also sometimes termed the "Bear' son" type, although "Bear's Son Tale" in general practice is a looser term that encompasses both 301 and 650A types.

The tale is classed more narrowly as type 301 B, and the whole group dubbed the "Jean de l'ours" type, especially in the French folkloristics community, whereas 301B is often called the "Strong man and his Companions" type in English-language circles. And analogues of "Jean de l'ours" often get admixed with elements of another but very similar tale type, Strong John (AT 650).

The Juan Oso tales as analyzed by the Spanish-language folklorists are described in similar vein, with certain differences. Juan Oso tales have disseminated widely to the New World, and fall widely into types 301A, 301B, 301C, or 301D. And they exhibit mixing not only with the AT 650 mentioned above, but also with Type 513 A, "Six Go through the Whole World".

Type 513 A is marked by the presence of "extraordinary helpers". Cosquin believed these (Note: Oak-Twister, Millstone-Hurler, Mountain-Pusher in the French tales) were an outside element introduced from other tales; and Clive Claudel attributed such helpers to Thompson's tale type 513 A. Bertram Colgrave on the other hand believed certain companions ("treeman", (Note: In the Mexican tale, arrancador or "puller" of trees.) "mountain man", "stone man", etc.) should be regarded as native to Juan Oso tales, whereas generic companions (Note: i.e., "of the general fairy tale type" to use Colgrave's exact wording.) (such as "the runner") are "strictly speaking" foreign to the tale group. (Note: Or, "strictly speaking, do not belong to the bear's-son saga" to put it in Colgrave's words).) (Note: Colgrave provides the generic extraordinary companions with the definition that they are those that have "their senses or faculties strongly developed like the runner, the hearer, the taster, the smeller, or the man with the highly developed sense". (Cf. Thompson's comment that men "endowed with some remarkable power (supernatural sight, hearing, speed, or the like", recur in tale types 513 and 514, and many others besides.)

It has been suggested that tale types ATU 301 and Jean de l'Ours, ATU 650 ("Strong Hans"), ATU 302 ("Devil's Heart in the Egg") and ATU 554 ("The Grateful Animals") may have once comprised a single narrative, but, with time, the original story fragmented into different tale types.

== French versions ==
=== Soldiers' version ===
A key example of type 301 B noted by French scholars such as Paul Delarue or Daniel Fabre is the version told by soldiers, and first published by Vidal et Delmart in 1833. No regional localization was given for the version. (Note: "Version des soldats, non localisée" (Delarue (1949), p. 315).) It was designated version 1 by Delarue, who gave a summary of it. It has also been translated into English as the tale of "The Story of John-of-the-Bear".

Birth and childhood (Note: Delarue's section heading is "II. Naissance et enfance du héros".)

A woodcutter's wife looking for wood is abducted by the bear, and gives birth to a child by this bear. The child walks at four months, speaks and runs at one year, and soon even rattles the stone with which the bear plugs the cave. The boy lifts the stone at age 5 or 6, and he and his mother escape. At school, his hairiness earns him the nickname "Jean de l'Ours" from other schoolchildren. He retaliates with violence, the schoolmaster demands his parents punish him, he drops out, and enters apprenticeship under a blacksmith.

His cane and companions

He leaves the blacksmith, and as compensation, obtains an iron cane weighing 800 pounds in the shaft and 200 pounds more at the pommel. He obtains two companions, Tord-Chêne ("Twistoak") and Tranche-Montagne ("Cutmountain"). (Note: Translated "Twistoak" and "Cutmountain" in the Borzoi Book. Tord/Twistoak used oak trees as cord to tie bundles of wood, Tranche/Cutmountain lifted boulders with pincers and smashed them).)

Inside the haunted castle (Note: Delarue entitled the section "IV. Dans le château hanté".)

Jean's party lodge at a castle, without sign of human presence, but with tables and beds prepared, and meals (and other wished-for items) that would appear as if by magic. (Note: When a pipe to smoke is wished for, it states "Poof! And there were three pipes of excellent Maryland tobacco on the table".) They decide to go hunting, leaving one behind to sound the lunch bell. Tranche remains at the castle on the first turn, but a size-changing "little giant (petit géant)" descends from the chimney and beats him terribly with a stick. (Note: Fife translates "walking-stick", Delarue gives bâton.) He blames a fall going down to the cellar for being unable to signal. Next day, another companion meets the same fate, and offers a different excuse. Jean defeats the little giant by striking him before he had the chance to grow large, and the enemy flees inside a well.

Descent and visit to the Underworld

They investigate the well, taking turns being lowered down riding a basket tied to a rope. Only Jean de l'Ours has courage to reach bottom. There John meets his informant, an old woman. She reveals the adversary to be a giant who abducted three princesses from Spain. Each princess is guarded separately: in a steel castle by 2 tigers, a silver castle by 4 leopards, and a gold castle by 6 lions as large as elephants. The old woman also provides a jar of ointment to cure wounds. Jean defeats the beasts and rescues the princesses. Each princess is prettier than the last. He finds them asleep, and uses increasingly gentler means to awaken them. The hero receives from the princesses a steel, a silver, and a golden ball, respectively.

The hero's climb out

The companions betray Jean and let go of the rope pulling him up. He falls and suffers a bruised body and broken legs, which the ointment cures. Jean gains advice from the old woman on how to escape the Underworld, and is lifted out riding a giant eagle, which requires feeding each time it squawks. Near the end he runs out of meat, and he flays some flesh from his own thigh, but this too heals using the jar of salve.

The return to the princesses

Jean reaches Madrid. His two former companions have claimed credit for saving the princesses, and the eldest is ordered to choose one of them to marry, but she is granted a stay for a year and a day. Meanwhile, they collect all the Marseilles soap in the kingdom to scrub the two men clean. The hero arrives and rolls his three balls, so the eldest knows to warn the king about their true savior. The king owns another set of the three balls, and declares marriage of his daughters to anyone who could replicate them. The hero succeeds by bringing the three balls he owns, and marries the eldest. The two treacherous companions are hanged on the high gallows.

=== Cosquin's version ===
A version from Lorraine was printed by Emmanuel Cosquin in 1886 (listed as Delarue's version 9). Its English translation appeared in Stith Thompson's One Hundred Favorite Folktales (1968). The plotline is quite similar to the soldier's version summarized above, with numerous differences in detail, which will be noted:

The hero's mother was already pregnant before being captured by bear, (Note: Delarue: femme enceinte avant capture), Delarue (1949), p. 323, note on version 9 (Cosquin).) but still born half-human, half-bear; given the John the Bear name as a child; apprentices under three blacksmiths, (Note: But staying long only with the third to learn his trade) cane is 500 pounds. Three companions: Jean de la Meule ('John of the Mill') playing quoits (original: palets) with a millstone, Appuie-Montagne ('Hold-up-Mountain') (Note: Holding up a mountain to keep it from falling and being dashed to bits.) and Tord-Chêne ('Oak-Twister'). Here it is a giant (not a size-shifting being) who attacks whichever companion is staying at the castle on his turn (i.e., whoever is keeping house while the others hunt; this is chosen by lot). Two companions blame kitchen smoke for their failure. John destroys the giant, splitting it in two with a cane.

He discovers the underworld by knocking on the floor with the cane; He descends hanging on a rope; (Note: As in the soldier's version, they ring a little bell (clochette) as signal to be lifted up.) at the bottom, hero's informant is a fairy (fée); hero destroys little devils in two rooms (Note: 11 devils in one room, 12 in another. Compare the three types of beasts in three castles in Delarue's version 1 above.) before reaching a chamber of three princesses; companions release rope carrying the hero. (Note: Whether cutting or releasing is still the same motif VI a^{1} according to Delarue's analysis.) (Note: The broken leg is healed by the ointment also, which here the fairy provides.)

The hero's escape from Underworld is up to a point by the "path leading to the ground above" formula, but unique in that the fairy warns him not to look back at the little light behind (lest the light vanish and make him unable to see anything). Hero after regains princesses from companions yet sends them home — this is also an unusual pattern; John refuses invitation to kingdom at that point, and only after princesses have forgotten about him, enters kingdom on his own volition. Formulaic test of replicating three balls is solved by balls hero obtained from princesses, but in this version, each is specifically an ornate ball made with pearls, diamonds and emeralds. (Note: "3 boules ornée de perles, diamants, émauds," noted as unique element, Delarue (1949), p. 320–323.)

== Other versions ==
=== Origins of the hero ===
Jean de l'Ours in most cases is the child of a mother and a bear. (Note: Element II, b. "Il naít d'un ours et d'une femme enlevée".) (Note: Delarue also concluded that the tale "gradually mitigated" the "shocking" human/animal relationship, by having the mother either being already pregnant, the bear capturing both mother and son, or the son being described as "strong as a bear".) However, in some versions his origins are less clearly defined, i.e. his mother is already pregnant before being captured, and then gives birth to him, though he is nevertheless born a half-bear, half-human (Cosquin's version above). Professor Michael Meraklis cited that the episode of a lion or bear stealing a human woman and the hero born of this "living arrangement" must preserve "the original form of the tale", since it harks back to the ancient and primitive notion that humans and animals could freely interact in a mythical shared past. (Note: "The significance of these totem animals (...) comes from old stories of encounters between animals and ancestors.")

In the same vein, by analysing Central Asian, Caucasian and Siberian variants of the animal-born hero, Russian scholarship concluded that the bear represents a totem or ancestor figure and the encounter of the human (a married woman or a married man) with the animal happens in the forest, a locus for the totem/ancestor. In addition, Karelian scholarship recognizes that the animal as an abductor of women shows very ancient character - a possible totemic remembrance - and the bear appears the most in Russian, Karelian, Vepsian and Ingrian variants of tale type 650A, "Ivan, The Bear's Ear". (Note: Professor Gražina Skabeikytė-Kazlauskienė reached a similar conclusion: "In the primeval world, an important feature of the man considered to be his physical strength. Among the male heroes we need to distinguish a mighty man. A prototype of the mighty man is a mythical hero. Mythical origin of the mighty man is first of all supported with the motif of unusual birth. According to the tale, a woman encountered a bear in the woods, it brought her to the cave, and she gave birth to a son who had bear’s ears and was very strong. In this case, the remnants of totemism are obvious.") (Note: Professor Petro Lintur was also inclined to believe that the character was a totemic remnant. In his words: "Even today, one still comes across traces of totemism in these Ukrainian folk tales. They are to be found, for example, in tales of the bear, the master of the dense forests and the Carpathian Mountains. Here the imagination of the people created a close correlation between humans and bears (...) The son of such a union (Ivan Vedmid [Bear]) usually turns out to be a valiant warrior who has the strength of a bear and is the hero of the tale.)

By comparing Romanian variants of type 301 to international tales, French philologist Jean Boutière, in his doctoral thesis, surmised that "much more often (especially in the West)", the hero is born of a union between a woman and a bear, but elsewhere, "notably in the East", the hero is the son of a mare, a she-donkey or even of a cow.

On the other hand, ethnologue John Bierhorst saw two different types of the Bear's Son narrative: one Eurasian, which follows the usual narrative very closely, and an American (Indigenous), "belong[ing] ... to British Columbia, the adjacent Yukon and southern Alaska", also known as The Girl Who Married the Bear or The Bear Mother.

=== The weapon of the hero ===
His cane weighs from 500 pounds (e.g. Cosquin's two full versions) ranging to 10,000 pounds (Carnoy ed.) in a version from Provence. Provence is where not the standard French but Provençal is the traditional language spoken, and the cane's weight of 10,000 pounds matches the 100 quintals given in an actual Provençal text published by Nelli, The cane's weight can even be 100,000 pounds, in a cognate tale from Brittany called "Yves of the iron stick", but this tale gives no bear-associated origins for the hero, and belongs in a group characterized by Delarue as being in the "periphery", to be distinguished from the main group of French tales that includes the representative example (Soldiers' version).

There are other examples where the hero is "John Iron-Stick", named after his cane (e.g., Jean Bâton de Fer, from a manuscript collection of tales from Nièvres,) but this tale also lacks the bear-origins opening. (Note: Delarue's IIa and b elements.) From Brittany, there is also Jean au bâton de fer, (Note: "Jean with the Iron-Stick".) where the hero is in the mother's womb for 3 years. as well as a version given in both translation and in the Breton language original, Jean a la Bar de Fer aka Iann he vaz houarn.

Other times, the cane is not iron, but an oak trunk of an equally imposing size.

=== The companions of the hero ===
The strong hero meets two (or more) equally strong companions in his travels: a man whose name is related to a type of tree ("Pine-twister") and another with abilities related to rock or stone ("Cliff-breaker"). According to Romanian scholar Petru Caraman (ro), in variants from Eastern Europe and from Slavic languages, they may be known as "Dughina", "Dubyna", "Vernidub", "Vertodub" or "Vyrvidub", and "Goryńa", "Vernigora", "Vertogor" or "Valigora". (Note: Vernidub and Vernigora contain the verb "vernút", that means "to return, to give back".) The pair of heroic brothers Waligora and Wydrzudab, from Polish legend, also belong to the same semantic field. In Western Europe, they correspond to French heroes "Tord-Chêne" and "Appuie-Montagne" (or "Liebois" and "Tranchemontagne") and German "Baumdreher" and "Steinzerreiber".

English scholar A. H. Wratislaw translated Vertogor as ‘Overturn-hill’ and Vertodub as ‘Overturn-oak’. Fellow British scholar William Ralston Shedden-Ralston translated Vertodub as "Tree-extractor" and Vertogor as "Mountain leveller" - both derived from Russian vertyet’, 'to twirl'; dub, 'tree' or 'oak', and gora, 'mountain'. He also compared Vertodub to German Baumdreher (or Holzkrummacher) and Vertogor to his counterpart Steinzerreiber (or Felsenkripperer).

These characters also exist in Romance languages variants. George Calinescu and Ovidiu Bîrlea indicated two counterparts in Romanian tales: Sfarma-Piâtra and Strimba-Lemne. In Portuguese, they are known as "Arrinca-pinheiros" ("Tears-out-pines") and "Abaixa-montes" ("Smashes-hills"); in more modern and less folksy Portuguese the former is called "Arranca-Pinheiros".

In tales from Bashkirs, the central character (a supernaturally powerful man) meets two or more companions: a man named Tau-Batyr (or Gora-Batyr, from Russian gora, 'mountain'), strong enough to move mountains, and another called Urman-Batyr or Imyan-Batyr (or Les-Batyr, from Russian les, 'forest'), strong enough to carry oak trees. (Note: "Batyr" is a Turkic-Mongolic word related to "Baghatur" and meaning "hero, brave".)

=== The perils of the castle ===
The hero's adversary at the "haunted" castle is typically a dwarf (or little man) who might be capable of becoming a giant, or just a giant, or it may be the devil in some instances. In the underworld, hordes of devils (or a devil) as enemies are a commonplace, but the devil(s) can be the hero's informant or both.

After tabulating the variants he collected in the Philippines for a general overview of the narrative, professor Dean Fansler noted that the event of the hero fighting the dwarf or devil who beat his companions "occur[red] in nearly all the folk-tales of the 'John the Bear' type".

=== Rescue of the princesses in the underworld ===
Folklorist William Bernard McCarthy, who published many variants of the tale type collected from American storytellers, noted that in all versions the rescue of the princesses from the underworld seemed to be a central part of the story.

Likewise, Robert Barakat emphasized that the tale type AT 301 can be decomposed into 6 episodes, two of which "the stolen princesses" (episode nr. 3) and "the rescue of the maidens" (episode nr. 4).

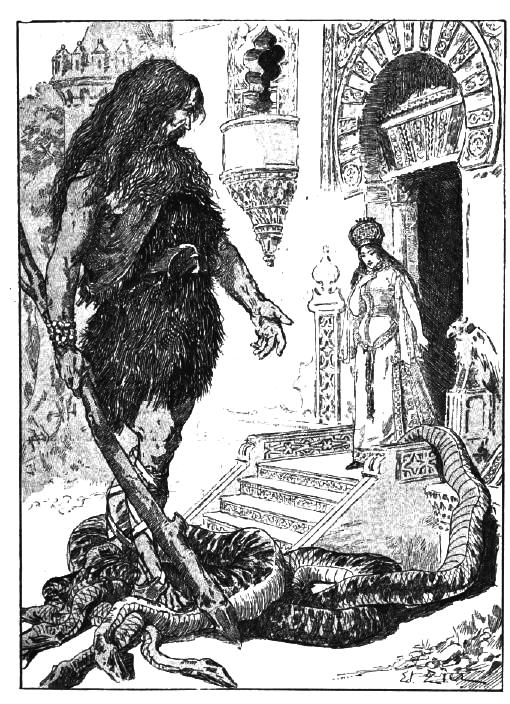
Hero Joan del'Ors releases the princess in the underground palace from her serpentine captor. Illustration by Édouard François Zier for Les Légendes de France (1883).

=== Further adventures in the underworld ===
In many variants, the hero is alerted by the princesses or discovers by himself two animals (goats or rams), one of a white color and the other of a black color. The white animal can take him to the surface, the black one will lead him further into the underworld. (Note: According to Armenian author and historian Marietta Shaginyan, in Armenian tales there are three rams: one white, one black, and a red one.) Either because he forgets this piece of information, or he is desperate to find an exit, he climbs onto the black animal and descends further into the strange underground realm. (Note: Scholar Joseph Szövérffy called this a "second or lower Underworld".) Often, it leads him to another kingdom, where a dragon has blocked all water sources and demands as ransom the sacrifice of a maiden (tale type ATU 300, "The Dragonslayer"). French comparativist Emmanuel Cosquin noted, in a monograph, the occurrence of the black and white animals in Greek, Turkish, Armenian tales, and in a story told by Hanna Diyab in 1709 to Antoine Galland. He noted that the event of the escape flight on the giant bird occurred as the closing episode of the second underworld.

Professor Michael Meraklis remarked that this episode is "usual" in Greek variants, and also happens "in many Anatolian versions". (Note: For example, in the Kurdish tale Načar Ogli, wherein the bird is the Tairē Semer (a variation on Simurgh).) This episode also appears in "some Jewish versions", which is confirmed by scholar Heda Jason's analysis of the Jewish Oriental tale corpus. Similarly, Swedish scholar Waldemar Liungman located the motif of the hero's descent into the second underworld on the goat or other animal in countries around the Black Sea and among the Arabs.

Further studies by professors Ting Nai-tung and Joseph Szövérffy indicate that this narrative also appears in Eastern Europe and Asia. A geographical analysis by Joseph Szövérffy pointed that this incident appears in Balkanic, Turkish and Caucasian variants. In addition, a pattern of migration seems to indicate that this motif spread from the Balkans in one route and into North Africa from another. Lastly, professor Szövérffy defended the idea that this motif was distinct enough from the other types that merited its own classification as AaTh 301C.

Georgian scholarship also registers the combination of types 301A and 301B with type 300: the hero defeats the dragon (translated as veshapi) and takes a journey on a griffin-like bird (translated as paskunji) back to the upper world.

Comparativist Yuri Berezkin limits the incidence of the two rams motif around the Mediterranean area, "but not beyond the Maghreb, the Middle Volga and Pamir."

Scholar Jiří Polívka listed other occurrences of the motif across European tales. Professor Raluca Nicolae interpreted this occurrence as alternance of a night and day cycle.

=== Escape from the Underworld: the flight on the eagle's back ===
The escape frequently involves a ride on the back of a giant bird, usually an eagle (as in the Soldier's version), (Note: Delarue's element VI c is his climbing out, c^{1} by a monster or quadruped, c^{2} by an eagle or some other bird.) sometimes a Roc. Versions also exist where the bird is a legendary avian creature, such as the Persian Simurgh, the Azeri Zumrud, the Turkish Zümrütü Anka, the Arabian bird Anqa, the Georgian Paskunji or a griffin. In American variants of the tale type, the hero is carried on the wings of a buzzard.

In the tale types AaTh 301, AaTh 301A and AaTh 301B, the hero, in the underworld, rescues the bird chicks of a tree nest and their father, in gratitude, takes him back to the surface. According to professor Nemanja Radulović, "this episode can be considered as the stable part of these tale-types". In that regard, professor Amar Annus suggests that both motifs ("the slaying of a dragon and the hero’s journey on an eagle’s back") were combined into "one coherent narrative" that "may have existed orally in ancient Mesopotamia".

On his way to the upper/surface world, the hero is advised by the eagle to bring him huge amounts of meat and drink to feed it on the arduous journey back. Eventually, the hero runs out of meat to feed his avian saviour and decides to rip pieces of his own flesh, to give the eagle energy to finish the journey. According to Hungarian scholarship, the motif of a hero feeding parts of his own flesh to the animal that transports him to the upper world is "found in the entire folk tale repertoire of Eurasia", in connection to the tale type ATU 301, "The Three Stolen Princesses".

In regards to the journey on the eagle's back, folklorist scholarship recognizes its similarities with the tale of Etana helping an eagle, a tale type later classified as ATU 537, "The Eagle as helper: hero carried on the wings of a helpful eagle". In her analysis of Armenian tale The Son of the Gray Horse, Professor Susie Hoogasian-Villa cited two Romani variants, one from Bukovina, where the hero of unusual birth is carried by the eagle, and one Welsh, where a dwarf takes the hero to the surface world.

Mythologist Mircea Eliade pointed that the motif can also be found in Siberian shamanism, and tales from Siberian folklore attest the transport of the hero by the eagle or another bird species from the depths of Hell to the world's surface. The geographical distribution of tale type ATU 301 with the presence of this motif seems to be spread along "Europe, large parts of Central Asia and the Middle East, China (Miao), Canada and South America".

In the same vein, Bernard Sergent suggested that the motif of a hero feeding parts of his own flesh to the eagle he uses to escape the underworld may actually show considerable antiquity. He suggested this motif, numbered B322.1 in Stith Thompson's Motif-Index of Folk-Literature, is the most ancient part of the tale type, being traceable to the Paleolithic.

=== Fate of the unfaithful companions ===
The ungrateful companions suffer various fates: either disappear, are punished, or forgiven depending on the version.

== Pyrenees ==
Versions of the tale found in the Pyrenees region, across languages. These include for example "Joan de l'Ors" in Occitan, from the Aude province, in the French Pyrenees, Joan de l'Os in Catalan on the Spanish side, and examples in Basque.

Daniel Fabre noted in his study of Jean de l'ours that there were parallels between the birth origins of the hero and the various bear festivals in the Pyrenees region, held during Candlemas or Carnival seasons. Violet Alford also noted that the tale of Jean de l'Ours showed "[a] more primitive compelling mountain form (Pyrenees and Alps) in which it is possible to distinguish some connection with the traditional bear cult of the Pyrenees."

A bolder claim has been made that Jean de l'ours episodes are reenacted in these festivals. (Note: Collado who made the claim draws on Emmanuel Le Roy Ladurie, but Ladurie merely analyzed the bear in these rituals as having aspects of both a flock-endangering beast, and a satyr-like sexual predator.)

In some legends, the Pic du Midi d'Ossau is the head of John the Bear. In the Pyrenees, 'Jean' is sometimes regarded as an Anglicized corruption of "people" (gens) or "giants" (géants), an assumption which works well in French, but not in the various other languages and dialects of the region.

== Occitan ==
The tale type AT 301B is said to be one of the most widespread tales (plus repándu) in the Occitaine. Indeed, French scholarship points that it is the region where most versions have been found so far.

An Occitan version Jan de l'Ours, collected by Urbain Gibert in Sougraigne, Aude was published by René Nelli, alongside his side-by-side French translation. Nelli may have preferred the orthography "Joan de L'Ors", or at least that was the spelling he used when he was alerting his pending publication.

Fabre and J. Lacroix also published a recitation of the tale by a conteuse from Aude (Louise Cassagneau).

The 19th century writer Valère Bernard had worked the Joan de l'Orso character throughout his work la Légenda d'Esclarmonda, and there was a building on that icon, so that in the eyes of some Joan de l'Orso may have appeared as "the hero par excellence of the Pays d'Oc".

=== Other Provence tales ===
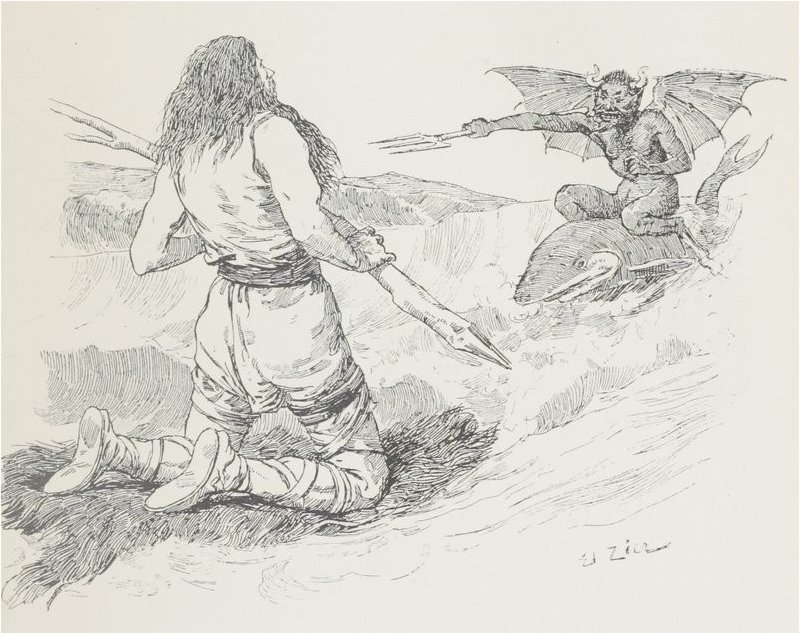
Jean-de-l'Ours combats the archdemon who uses a shark as his mount. —illustration by É. Zier.

Some tales from Provence were published in standard French. In Hippolyte Babou's version (1862), considered to be an arranged piece of work to a large degree, the hero goes to the Holy Land region into Palestine on his bearskin, and faces off with an archdemon who rides a shark. (Likewise in the version close to it printed by Henri Carnoy, with illustrations by Édouard François Zier).

Henri Carnoy also published a version (Note: Already referred to above in #Physical appearance and regarding the weight of the cane in #Other versions.) in which a mother who had no food due to famine exposed her infant in the woods, but the child was raised by a mother bear that lost one of its cubs. The plotline is somewhat elaborate. A slaying of dragons rescues three princesses, Pomme d'or, Pomme d'argent, Pomme de cuivre ("Golden-Apple", "Silver-Apple", "Copper-Apple"). Although this is enough number of brides for Jean's party, the betrayal of the cut cord still ensues. Pomme d'or refuses marriage to a traitor, and wishes to wed Jean. So the two companions consult a witch on a way to murder Jean and Pomme d'or. An evil spirit with the black beard who enters into the betrayers' service is defeated and killed by Pomme d'or's guardian spirit, whom she summons by biting into her gold apple. The two companions are punished by the guardian spirit, but afterwards forgiven by Jean.

== Basque ==
The corresponding character is denoted Juan Artz [xwan arts̻], Hachko, or Xan Artz [ʃan arts̻] in Basque country.

One Basque version of the tale is Juan Artz, edited by Resurrección María de Azkue accompanied by Spanish translation. The name Juan Artz denotes "Juan Bear", where hartza is the word for "bear". The story begins by stating "They say that Juan was raised by a she-bear in the mountains because his mother had no breast". This pattern where not a male but female bear is involved, and suckles the infant, is given by Delarue as one of the alternative origins for hero in the tale group, but it is not exhibited in many examples in his list. (Note: Few examples, apparently only Delarue's 5., from Birette, B. Norm., 44.) This motif of a she-bear raising the hero is paralleled by Orson in Valentine and Orson, a tale widely read in roman bleue (chapbook) form in the early modern period.

In the tale given by Jean Barbier, Hachko eta harén bi lagunak (French: Hachko et ses deux compagnons; "Hachko and his two companions"), (Note: Hachko means "little bear".) instead of a bear, it is the Basa-Jaun ([bas̺a jaun], (Note: The initial /j/ may be ɟ, d͡ʒ, ʒ, ʃ, or χ.) French: Seigneur Sauvage) who kidnaps the girl in the forest and carries her to an underground dwelling. But Barbier's version which makes this substitution has been suspected of being an interpolation of a modern date, most probably by Barbier himself, in a study by N. Zaïkak.

According to the hypothesis, Barbier based his tale on Jean-François Cerquand's version, l'Ourson or Le fils d'ours ("bear cub" or "bear's son"; Basque: Hartch Ume) published in 1878 and 1882. This version was taken down from a native of Mendive in Basse-Navarre. (Note: In the story, a girl returning from Mendive to Otchagarria in Spain is abducted by a bear in the Irati Forest.)

== Spain ==
Aurelio Espinosa, Sr. published three versions of Juan el Oso from Spain in his Cuentos Populares Españoles: Juanito el Oso (from Blacos, Soria in Castile and León and another from Tudanca, Santander) and Juanillo el Oso (from Villaluenga, Toledo).

Versions found in Spain are marked by the motif of the devil's ear, or Lucifer's ear, which are present in Espinosa's versions named above. When the hero cuts the ear off the diabolical adversary, he has gained mastery over him, and thereafter, the hero can summon the devil by biting on the ear, and command him at his disposal. In one tale the hero encounters a duende (a sort of goblin) who severs his own ear and gives it to Juanito. In some versions, "Lucifer's Ear" becomes the title of the tale. (Note: La oreja de Lucifer, a literary version by Fernán Caballero.) This motif also occurs widely in various versions from Latin America and Spanish-speaking populace in the United States (§Versions in the Americas).

In Juanito el Oso (Blacos version above), the bear's son has a massive ball weighing 100 arrobas (2500 lbs.) made for him, to be used as weapon. His companions are Arrancapinos y Hace sogas "Uproots-Pinetrees-and-Makes-Ropes") and Allana cerros con Culo ("Flattens-Hills-with-Buttocks").

Espinosa published more versions in Cuentos populares de Castilla y León: Juanillo el Oso and Juan Os from Peñafiel, Valladolid. And a non-ursine variant, called El Hijo Burra ("Donkey's son") from Roa, Burgos.

Spanish scholarship has called attention to a similar being from Valencian folklore: the strong Esclafamuntanyes (ca), also described in some versions as the son of a bear and a human woman.

The Asturian tradition reports various tales about a Xuan l'Osu ("John the Bear"), often accompanied or faced with a fox character (raposa or rapiega). Xuan l'Osu is often characterized as a 'young man with amazing strength and a tail capable of moving rocks', and he's said to be the offspring of a woman kidnapped by a bear and the animal itself. In the parish of Tuña (Tineo) there is a place named Pena l'Osu ("the Bear's Rock"), named so because it was thought to be where this woman was kidnapped to. Depending on the version, Xuan l'Osu may face the Devil, a giant, an ox of fire or a seven-headed dragon. The character also appears much more rarely as Xuan de la Burra ("John of the donkey"). In some versions Xuan l'Osu tries to eat the townsfolk's oxen, with a fox character (raposa) often coming to save the farm animals by cleverly deceiving the bear and delivering a moral lesson. Scholarship has observed these two oppositions between the bear and the fox may represent oppositions in the expected roles of women (and specially mothers, represented by the fox) and men (represented by the bear).

== Versions in the Americas ==
There are cognate tales found in various parts of the Spanish-speaking Americas. Espinosa, Sr. collected 33 tales published in his Cuentos Populares Españoles.

=== Mexican versions ===
Variants of the story have been collected among the Mexican population of the United States, and in Mexico (in Chihuahua, Jalisco, Guadalajara, Mitla, Tehuantepec, Oaxaca, Chiapas—Chamula, and Zinacantán).

American folklorist Robert A. Barakat published in English translation his collected versions "of North Mexico". These included a tale (entitled Juan el oso) collected in Ciudad Juárez, Mexico, (Note: Barakat does not clearly identify the tale type, suggesting it is contaminated by several motifs "usually found in other tale types", p. 335.) as well as tales from natives of that city residing in the United States: a version entitled Juan Oso collected in El Paso, Texas, in 1964, (Note: Barakat says "John Bear" follows the typical plotline of type 301A. Barakat (1965), p. 335.) and a fragmentary Juan de la burra (John of the Donkey).

Frank Goodwyn had also published in 1953 a complete Juan de la burra (collected in Chicago). Here, it can be seen that not only is the animal transposed to a female donkey, it is not the hero's parent, but only his wetnurse which allowed the abandoned child to suckle. It thus resembles the tale of El Hijo Burra ("Donkey's son") of Spain. (Note: Except the hero has no name like "Juan" in the Spanish tale from Roa, Burgos.)

The hero's helpers in the El Paso version were Aplanacerros (Mountain Breaker) and Tumbapinos (Pine Twister), reminiscent of names in the French version, whereas in the Juan de la burra, they were Carguín Cargón (the Carrier), Soplín Soplón (the Sigher), Oidín Oidón (the Hearer), exactly as found in Fernán Caballero's La oreja de Lucifer, which is indeed a story classified as Type 301B, but one whose protagonist has no connection to a bear or any substituted animal.

In Mexican versions, the machete (Note: The machete given by Mountain Jumper.) or a machete weighing 24 kilograms has displaced the massive cane in French versions. There is also a version with an "iron weapon" (Note: The iron weapon which the grandfather (the king) provides. Barakat assumes it to be a machete in subsequent discussion (Barakat (1967)).) with which he severs the devil's ear.

== International distribution ==
According to Stith Thompson's study, the tale is found "over the whole of Europe" ("specially well known in the Baltic and in Russia"), in the Near East, North Africa and in the Americas (brought by the French and the Spanish).

=== Europe ===
The tale type is said to be found "in all the Indo-European language groups of Europe", as well in the Finno-Ugric family (e. g., in Finnish, Estonian and Sami languages) and in Basque. In the same vein, critic Walter Puchner, in Enzyklopädie des Märchens, remarked that type AaTh 301B is "more typical" of Western, Central and Northern Europe.

It has been noted that "the story of the underground journey and the three princesses ... is ubiquitous in the Hispanic tradition", where the strong hero travels to the underworld realm with his companions with fantastical powers.

Professor Susie Hoogasian-Villa claimed that the tale-type "The World Below" is "one typical Armenian folktale": the hero rescues three princesses in the underworld realm, is abandoned by his companions and hitches a ride on the eagle's back in order to return to the surface.

According to Professor Bronislava Kerbelytė, the tale type AT 301B is reported to register 240 Lithuanian variants, under the banner The Mighty Man and the Fellow Travellers, with and without contamination from other tale types.

In a Georgian variant, Asphurtzela ("hundred leaves"), a mother's daughter is captured by a devi and forciby married to it. Her three sons are also captured by the devi. Years later, the woman gives birth to a boy named Asphurtzela, who matures very rapidly and develops great strength. He goes to another village and rescues his siblings. Later, in his travels, he meets a "clod-swallower" and a "hare-catcher" with millstones tied to both feet. The trio sets up camp and cook their food, but three devi insist to eat it. His friends relent and let the devi eat their food, but Asphurtzela kills the devi and follow its severed head to a hole, where three princesses are being held captive. The usual narrative follows, but the avian helper of the hero in this version is a griffin, after the hero helped its young.

=== Eastern Europe and Asia ===
On the other hand, professor Jack Haney stated that the types AT 301A and 301B, "The Three Underground Tsardoms", are very popular in "the East Slavic world", and its combination with tale type AT 650A, "Strong Hans", is "very common in the Urals".

Professor Dean Fansler collected nine variants from the Philippines archipelago and based on their similarities to tabulate a general overview of the narrative. He also noted that the variants he collected were connected to "two well-known European cycles of folk-tales, - 'Strong Hans' and 'John the Bear'".

Professor Bertram Colgrave also stated that variants have been found in Indian languages.

Similarly, Chinese folklorist and scholar Ting Nai-tung collected some 62 variants of the tale type AT 301 from China and adjacent countries. He also remarked that Chinese scholarship had already noted their resemblance to European folktales by the early 20th century.

One variant from a Daghur source was collected, containing the ursine-born hero, the betrayal by his companions (two ghosts from a haunted house), the rescue of a maiden in a cave and the journey back to the surface on a bird.

==== Middle East ====
German scholar Ulrich Marzolph stated that the tale type AT 301 "The Three Stolen Princesses", showed "particular prominence" in the Eastern Mediterranean and Near East regions.

The tale type is also said to be popular in Iraq.

=== Americas ===
The tale, in the Americas, is claimed to be widespread in Andean tradition ("relato panandino") and purportedly belongs to an ancient indigenous tradition, although variants exist in Peru, Ecuador, Bolivia, Argentina and Central America.

Variants of the tale type have been collected from the oral tale repertoire of many Native American populations, such as the Maliseet, the Shoshone, the Assiniboine and the Chilcotin (Tsilhqotʼin).

Anthropologist Elsie Clews Parsons recorded three variants, one from Martinique and two from Guadeloupe, that mix type AT 650A (the mishaps of the hero's childhood) with type AT 301B (rescue of princesses in the underworld and flight on eagle).

=== Literary variants ===
Scholarship recognizes the Spanish rhyming story Las Princesas Encantadas as belonging to ATU 301 tale type. In this story, a king locks his three daughter in a tower (instead of an underground prison) and the hero, after he is betrayed by his brothers, escapes the tower with the help of a magical flying horse. The story continues as another tale type: ATU 314, "Goldener" (prince works in menial position in another king's palace).

== Parallels ==
It has been suggested that the tale of John the Bear may be connected to the legend of Georgian hero Amirani and character Sbadilòn, the hero of an Italian fairy tale.

=== Sbadilòn ===
Sbadilòn, or Giovanni Sbadilòn Senzaterra, is the protagonist of a Mantua tale collected from an old female storyteller in the 1970s. Sbadilón carries a spade and meets two strong companions: Tagliaboschi, son of a charcoal burner ("carbonaio") and Darfino Ammazzacinquecento ("Darfino Crushes-Five-Hundred"). By lifting a marble tombstone, Sbadilón descends to an underworld realm (possibly Hell), kills five evil wizards and rescues a princess. In this story, the betrayal of the companions does not occur; instead, he willingly decides to stay underground, until an eagle bites his flesh and carries him back to the surface.

=== Conon ===
Scholarship on the tale type indicates similarities between the narrative and a tale by Greek writer Conon. In this story, two shepherds find a pot of honey in a cave. One descends the hole in a basket, sends the pot of honey to his companion. However, one betrays the other, leaving him to die in the pit. The other shepherd has a vision that god Apollo instructs the man to hurt his own flesh to attract vultures. The ploy works and the vultures carry the shepherd to their nest at the foothill.

=== Ancient Greece ===
Paul Delarue also listed as ancient parallels to the bear-born hero a myth about Polyphonte and her twin sons Agrius and Oreius, born of a male bear, and a version where Arcesius, grandfather to Odysseus, was sired by human Cephalus and a she-bear.

=== Torec ===
Professor Joseph Szövérffy drew attention to another possible parallel to the tale type: in an episode of the medieval (13th century) romance Torec, chevalier Melions descends to a cave to rescue his beloved and two other maidens, captured by a dwarf. After he sends them through a rope to his two companions, they betray him and leave him stranded in the cave. With the help of animals (a horse, two dogs and two hawks), he returns to the surface.

=== Er Töštük ===
Turkish folklorist Pertev Naili Boratav noted that Kyrgyz epic Er Töštük contains several similarities to types 301A and 301B: after an encounter with the dangerous witch Želmoğuz, Er Töštük falls into the Underworld. Down there, he disguises himself with a scurvy appearance and marries a local princess. His father-in-law sends Er Töštük and his brothers-in-law on some errands, including finding the magical colts of the Spotted Mare that were stolen. On this quest, Er Töštük rescues the children of the Giant Eagle from the Dragon. Some time later, he has to return to the surface, and the Giant Eagle, in gratitude for his previous good deed, takes him and his wife back to his realm.

== John Bear in literature ==
In 1868, Prosper Merimee published Lokis, a new telling of a mysterious marriage Count, which appears to be born from the rape of his mother, and probably by a bear, these elements are gradually revealed, until the epilogue where the animal instincts of the character come to the fore. This news is written following a trip Merimee did in Lithuania and the Baltic countries where the story (or legend) was underway.

In 1990, Alina Reyes evokes the myth in her second novel, Lucie au Long Cours.

In 2011, the novel by Philippe Jaenada "Woman and Bear" explicitly refers to the tale.

== See also ==
For tales about wild men and strong heroes:

- The Adventures of Massang (Kalmyk folktale)
- Bear's Son Tale
- Basajaun
- Fehérlófia (Hungarian folk tale)
- The Son of a Horse (Chinese folktale)
- Son of the White Mare, Hungarian animated film
- Valentine and Orson
- Waligóra and Wyrwidąb ("Mountain Beater" and "Oak Tearer"), legendary Polish heroes
- Gorynya, Dubynya and Usynya
- Wild men

For other tales about rescuing princesses in the underworld:

- Dawn, Midnight and Twilight
- Prâslea the Brave and the Golden Apples
- The Gnome (fairy tale)
- The Story of Bensurdatu
- The Norka
- Jihaguk daejeok toechi seolhwa
- Kotyhoroshko
