= Jihaguk daejeok toechi seolhwa =

Korean folktale

Jihaguk daejeok toechi seolhwa 지하국대적퇴치 설화 The Downthrow of the Fearsome Underworld Enemy

Folk tale
- Name: Jihaguk daejeok toechi seolhwa 지하국대적퇴치 설화; The Downthrow of the Fearsome Underworld Enemy
- Aarne–Thompson grouping: 300
- Country: Korea

Jihaguk daejeok toechi seolhwa (Korean: 지하국대적퇴치 설화; lit. The Downthrow of the Fearsome Underworld Enemy) is a Korean folktale about a heroic figure who defeats an underworld monster that kidnaps humans above ground and steals from them in order to marry the woman he rescues. The story features the theme of quest through the journey the protagonist embarks on to find his bride as well as the theme of eradication in terms of the protagonist’s defeat of the monster.

== History and Transmission ==
Ever since Son Jin-tae introduced this tale to Korean academia, it has been referred to as either “Jihaguk daejeok jechi seolhwa” or “Jihaguk daejeok toechi seolhwa,” the titles respectively given by Son Jin-tae and Jang Deok-sun. The tale has a long history which is demonstrated not only by the way it served as a motif for multiple biographical novels including Geumwonjeon (금원전 The Tale of Kim Won), Geumnyeongjeon (금령전 The Tale of the Golden Bell), and Choe Chi-won jeon (최치원전 The Tale of Choe Chi-won), but through traces of it in other stories such as Shenyang dongji (申陽洞記) in the Chinese story collection Jiandeng Xinhua (剪燈新話 New Tales for the Trimmed Lampwick), Hong Gil-dong jeon (홍길동전 The Tale of Hong Gil-dong), and Seol In-gwi jeon (설인귀전 The Tale of Seol In-gwi). For instance, Geumnyeongjeon is similar to Jihaguk daejeok toechi seolhwa in that the protagonist rescues and marries a princess abducted by a monster with nine heads. Jihaguk daejeok toechi seolhwa appears to have influenced the second half of Hong Gil-dong jeon in which Hong Gil-dong establishes a kingdom called Yuldoguk, defeats a monster inside a cave, and takes as his wife the kidnapped woman he rescues from the monster. Jihaguk daejeok toechi seolhwa has been orally passed down nationwide in Korea and approximately sixty variations of the tale can be found in collections such as Hanguk gubi munhak daegye (한국구비문학대계 Compendium of Korean Oral Literature).

== Plot ==
=== Summary ===
Once upon a time, a maiden became kidnapped by a monster from the underworld. When the maiden’s parents offered all they owned in addition to their daughter in exchange for her rescue, a general came forward and set out on the mission. After a series of severe trials, the general finally learned that the monster was living in the underworld and discovered a narrow door leading to it. The general tried to make his men climb down a rope to reach the underworld, but all of them gave up halfway. The general was left with no choice but to make the trip himself. Once down in the underworld, the general hid up in a tree beside a well. Shortly afterwards, a maiden came along to draw water. The general dropped a few leaves into the water jar to inform her of his presence and was able to infiltrate the monster’s house with her help. The maiden asked the general to lift a rock to see whether he was strong enough to defeat the monster, but the general failed the test. The maiden thus gave the general some invigorating water to drink and had him build up his strength. Once he grew stronger, the general was finally able to slay the monster and send all the kidnapped people back up above ground. However, the men waiting above ground snatched the maiden and took off without waiting for their general. The general eventually escaped from the underworld with the help of a deity, punished the men who betrayed him, and married the maiden he rescued.

=== Variation ===
The protagonist’s identity differs from time to time in some variations of this folktale. The protagonist is sometimes a strong man, warrior, military officer, idler, hunter, or a boy. The female abducted by the underworld enemy is sometimes a princess or a lady from an affluent family. Instead of the kidnapped maiden, a deity serves as a guide to the protagonist in some variations, or the protagonist is assisted by a magpie indebted to the protagonist. In terms of subtypes, this tale is linked to the story Geumdwaejigul (금돼지굴 The Golden Boar in a Cave), which is related to the birth story of Choe Chi-won. A variation in which the protagonist ventures down to the underworld in pursuit of the monster that killed his mother shares connections with the stories Kkori datbal judungi datbal goemul (꼬리 닷발 주둥이 닷발 괴물 The Monster With a Five Feet Long Beak and Tail) and Jomagu (조마구 The Monster Jomagu).

== Features and Significance ==
In Jihaguk daejeok toechi seolhwa, the protagonist experiences all sorts of hardships and ordeals before defeating the villain and marrying a woman of high birth. This tale’s protagonist hence coincides with the typical image of those in other folktales who embark on an adventure without fear or hesitation. Also, the conflict between the protagonist, his subordinates, and the fearsome enemy marks a clear division between good and evil and leads to a typically optimistic ending in which the good wins.

Jihaguk daejeok toechi seolhwa revolves around the conflict between the protagonist’s world above ground and the underworld where the fearsome enemy resides. The storyline is similar to that of heroic epics in that the protagonist sets out on an adventure and overcomes adversities to fulfill a mission. On the other hand, this tale’s protagonist is not someone born under extraordinary circumstances or with a remarkable skill, which is different from those of other myths or legends. The protagonist in this tale remains closer to the general formula of an ordinary figure showing his potential while searching for a solution.

The motif of Jihaguk daejeok toechi seolhwa has most likely been adapted and altered by other old Korean novels. The significance of this folktale therefore lies in the impact it had and connections it shares with old Korean stories such as Geumwonjeon, Geumnyeongjeon, and Choe Chi-won jeon, and even Hong Gil-dong jeon.

== Other ==
Folktales similar to Jihaguk daejeok toechi seolhwa can be found not only in Korea, but around the world. In the West, this sort of story is referred to as a tale of magic, or a Perseus and Andromeda type of story. The tale also shares commonalities with several types of stories under the Aarne-Thompson classification: Type 300 (The Dragon Slayer), Type 301 (The Bear’s Son), and Type 303 (The Twins or Blood-brothers). Type 301 is also known as “The Three Stolen Princesses”, which suggests a connection to this particular Korean folktale.

== See also ==
- Jean de l'Ours
- Fehérlófia (Hungarian folk tale)
- Dawn, Midnight and Twilight
- Prâslea the Brave and the Golden Apples
- The Gnome (fairy tale)
- The Story of Bensurdatu
- The Norka
- The Son of a Horse (Chinese folktale)

== Sources ==
- “Jihaguk daejeok toechi: The Fur-hatted Man and Sworn Brothers,” Compendium of Korean Oral Literature.
- “The Golden Boar’s Descendants by Choe Go-un (1),” Compendium of Korean Oral Literature.
- “Jihaguk daejeok toechi (地下大敵退治),” Compendium of Korean Oral Literature.
