= The Adventures of Massang =

Kalmyk folktale about an animal-born hero

The Adventures of Massang is a Kalmyk folktale about a strong hero born of a cow, who finds three companions and has further adventures. The tale was published in the Siddi-Kur (or Siddhi-Kur), a compilation of Kalmyk and Mongolian stories.

The story is related, in the international Aarne-Thompson-Uther Index, to type ATU 301, "The Three Stolen Princesses", as a former subtype, AaTh 301B, "The Strong Man and his Companions": a hero of hybrid human-animal origin finds strong companions and climbs down to an underworld, and is eventually betrayed by his companions.

== Origins ==
=== The Bewitched Corpse compilation ===
The Tales of the Bewitched Corpse is a compilation of Indo-Tibetan stories that was later brought to Mongolia and translated to Mongolic languages. The collection is known in India as Vetala Pañcaviṃśati, in Tibet as Ro-sgrung, in Mongolia as Siditü kegür, and in Oirat as Siddhi kǖr.

In this regard, Mongolian linguist Tsendiin Damdinsüren noted the existence of two Tibetan compilations of Vetala tales, one with 13 chapters and the other with 21. Also, both versions were mentioned in the work The Book of the Son, written in the 11th century. Lastly, the divergence in contents between the Indian Vetala and the Tibetan versions, according to Damdinsuren, may indicate the latter were original works, instead of an adaptation or translation. In the same vein, according to Tibetologist Françoise Robin, there are more than 20 versions of the compilation in the Tibetan-speaking zone alone, and their common versions contain between thirteen and twenty-five stories, with some even reaching up to 75 tales.

=== The origin of the Massang tale ===
Hungarian Mongolist Lászlo L. Lörincz (1965) noted that the tale of Massang contained two "independent" parts connected as a loose whole. In the same vein, Tibetologist Rolf Stein argued the tale of Masang existed as "an indigenous tale" before being inserted into the compilation as the third story of the Tibetan and Mongolian redactions of The Bewitched Corpse, being also mentioned in other works, such as Father's Teaching and the Son's Teaching (Pha-chhos, Bu-chhos), from the 11th century.

According to Chinese researcher Lin Jifu, stories of a hero with animal parentage are found "primarily" among the nomadic and hunting peoples of northern and western China, and the Tibetan people have the oldest tradition and the highest number of variants. The tale Nor-bzang rgyal-po (or Ma-bzang rgyal-po and alternate spellings) is found in the Tibetan compilation Tales of the Corpse (Ro-sgrung), a book of tales that is referenced in ancient Tibetan literature as being as old as the 2nd century CE. At least fourteen manuscriptural versions exist in Tibet, with a varying number of tales in each one, but all contain a "common story": Brother Masang, the story of an ox-headed hero with human shape who joins forces with extraordinary companions to fight demons. The tale is not present in the original Indian compilation Twenty-Five Tales of Vetala, but must have existed in oral form at the time and was incorporated into the literary tradition, which helped in its diffusion.

== Summary ==
=== Slaying the Shimmu ===
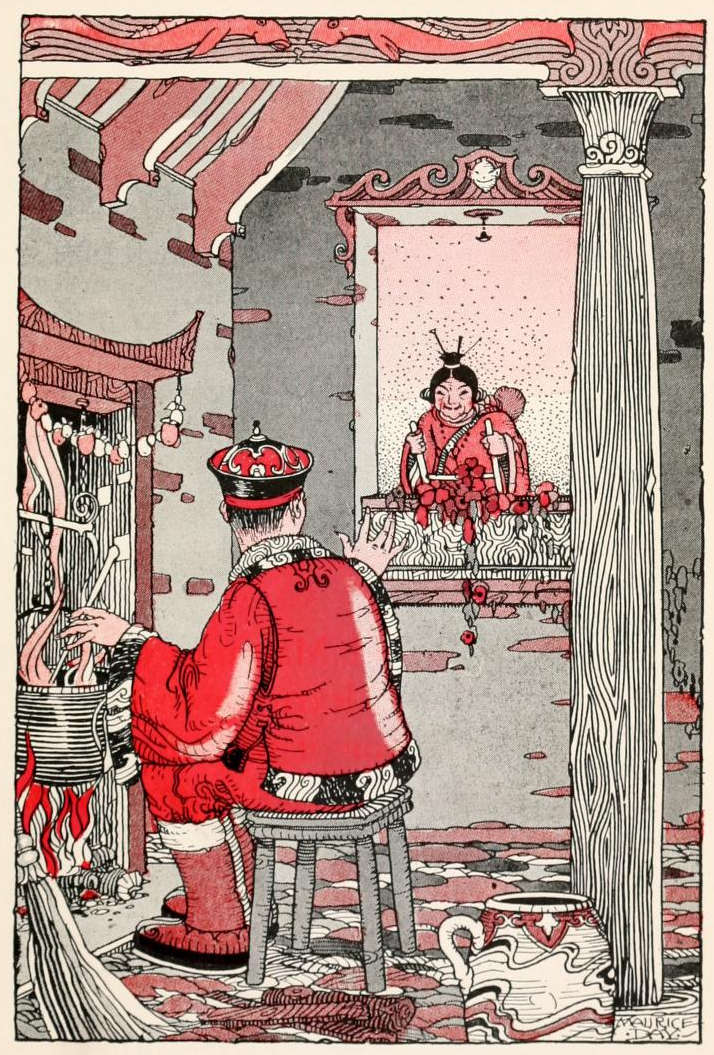
The little woman climbs on the window and spies on Massang's friend preparing the food. Illustration by Maurice Day for Wonder Tales from Tibet (1922).

In the tale How the Schimnu-Khan was Slain, of Tibetan or Mongolian provenance, the first part shows the birth of a youth named Massang "of the bull's head". A poor man's only cow gives birth to a half-man, half-cow hybrid and its owner is horrified by the creature. The cow-man, receiving clemency, flees from the old man and into the world. The youth meets a "black-coloured man (...) born of the dark woods", a "green-coloured man (...) born of the green meadows" and a "white-coloured man (...) born of the crystal rock" and the quartet soon move to a dwelling overlooking a hill. They take turns cooking the food while the others gather game nearby. One day, a small old woman appears and beats the three companions to steal their food ("milk and meat", as the story says). On the fourth day, Massang sees the little old woman and matches strength with the creature. After three tests, the little woman escapes and leaves behind a blood trail for the four heroes to follow. They soon come to an opening in the rock; down below, the witch's corpse strewn about near heaps and heaps of treasure. Massang descends to take the treasure to his companions but they betray him and leave him for dead in the pit. Massang sleeps on the witch's corpse - for years - and when he awakes, three cherry trees have sprouted, which he uses to climb to the surface. He visits his treacherous companions and discovers they have made a life for themselves with the witch's treasure, but they beg Massang to spare them.

=== Origin of a constellation ===
In the second part of the tale, Massang decides to spare his former companions and carries on with his life. He finds a beautiful maiden carrying water in a jug and follows her. Massang arrives at the court of Churmusta Tengri, who bids welcome to the hero and tells him his arrival is most propitious. Churmusta Tengri explains that there will be a war between a white host of Tengri forces and the black host of the Schummu. Massang helps the white hosts by defeating the black host leader. At the end of the tale, a Schummu strikes a hammer against the ground and sparks fly out, originating seven stars of a constellation (Ursa Major or the Pleiades). In this version of the tale, translated by British folklorist Rachel Harriette Busk, the narrator, in the framing device of the book, comments that he never returned to his master to bring him riches.

== Versions ==
Charles Fillingham Coxwell translated the tale as Massang's Adventure. In his translation, Massang's companions are a "dark complexioned man (...) descended from the forest", a man of green colour "born of the turf" and a white man originated from crystal.

The tale was also translated by Charles John Tibbits as The Adventures of Massang, wherein Massang is described as horned; the dark man is called Iddar, Son of the Forest, and the other two Son of the Grass and Son of the Sedges. In his translation, the Schummu smites Massang and from this action seven stars spring out.

In a Russian language translation of the tale, titled "Массанг" ("Massang"), published in 1978, the hero's companions are given the following names: Idder (Иддер) of the dark woods; Geger (Гегер) of the green fields/meadows; and Adder (Аддер) of the white mountains. This tale also contains the origins of the constellation, but ends on a happy note.

Massang also appears in a Tibetan and in a Kalmyk tale. In the latter, he is born from a human couple in the country of India, but still shows the bull/ox features, like horns and a tail.

In a version of the tale translated by author Eleanore Myers Jewett with the title The Promise of Massang, sourced as Tibetan, the translator removed the animal birth of the hero, thus making him a normal boy instead. The tale lacks the second part about the origin of the constellation, and ends with Massang bringing the cow's owner the riches he promised.

== Variants ==
According to German Tibetologist Dieter Schuh, the tale of the ox-man and the origin of the constellation appears in both Tibetan and Mongolian literature. Hungarian orientalist László L. Lőrincz remarked that the tale is attested in a Tibetan collection named Ro-sgruṅ ("The Magic Corpse"), with the title Ya-ru-kha-khra'i le'u-ste. He also noted that the tale is popular in Mongolia, published in the Siditü kegür, and the hero may be known by the Tibetan name Yarupa or by Masang.

=== Mongolia ===
Hungarian orientalist László L. Lőrincz established the classification of the Mongolian tale corpus, published as Mongolische Märchentypus ("MMT"). In his system, he indexed a Mongolian type numbered MMT 127, Der kalbsköpfige Masang ("The Calf-Headed Masang"), which corresponds to tale type 301B. In the tale type, a hybrid son is born of a union between a man and a cow or a man and a she-bear; in his youth he meets equally powerful companions and they move out to a house; a diminute demoness attacks the heroes while they are preparing food, and Masang defeats her; they follow the trail to a hole and Masang descends and defeats the witch; he steals the demoness's treasure, but his companions abandon him down below; to escape, he plants a magical seed for a tree to grow or a bird carries him up to the surface. Later, Masang helps deity Qormusda in his battle against demons; Qormusda either transforms Masang to human form, or he dies and his body is sundered to make the Ursa Major constellation; or he intervenes in a war between two Khans and marries the daughter of the victor.

György Kara, Hungarian professor of Mongolian studies, provided a Hungarian language translation of a Mongolian tale with the title "Ам цагаан бяруу". In his translation, titled Am Cagán Bjarú, a Fehérszájú Borjú ("Am Cagán Bjarú, The White-Mouthed Calf"), the constellation Dolon Burhan ("The Seven Buddhas") was originally a man named White-Mouthed Calf. The story is largely the same: the ox-man hero is born of a cow, meets three companions (a man from the forest, a man from the woods, and a man sat on a stone), and finds them a house. While there, a mysterious old woman appears and demands a bit of their food, and attacks them after being denied. The White-Mouthed Calf hurts the old woman and follows her to a pit, he is betrayed by his companions, but reaches the surface after three years by climbing on three trees that sprouted on the old woman's corpse. At the end of the tale, the White-Mouthed Calf helps the Celestial Emperor against the Emperor of Demons, but an evil woman, ally of the Emperor of Demons, strikes the hero with a weapon and his body is torn apart in seven pieces. The Celestial Emperor takes the seven pieces and creates the Seven Buddhas constellation.

=== Buryat people ===
Folklorist Elizaveta V. Barannikova translated and published a Buryat tale titled "Тугал Масан" ("Tugal Masan"). The tale is inserted as a story-within-a-story told by the Burkhan: Tugal Masan meets a Black Tarba, a White Tarba, and a Blue Tarba. In the part about the celestial king, Tugal Masan is recruited to fight against the black yak army of Khara Lusan Khan. At the end of the tale, Tugal Masan survives and is offered to marry the daughter of the celestial king, but he declines.

=== Tibet ===
Tibetologist David MacDonald translated and published a Tibetan tale he titled The Story of Yakro Kharto. In this tale, a widowed man goes hunting and finds the bull-man in the forest. The bull-man, named Yakro Kharto, begs to be spared and flees into the woods. He meets three companions: a black man named Forest-Born, a green youth named Born-in-the-Grass and another named Born-in-a-Glass-House. The tale is much the same: the companions' betrayal, the small old woman and the return to the surface by climbing the peach tree. In the second part of the story, Yakro Kharto follows the maiden and meets King Gyajin, who asks his help in defeat in the evil spirits. At the end of the tale, the gods descend a rope from the heavens which Yakro Kharto climbs up and reaches the stars.

In a variant titled Masang Yharu Khadra, sourced as from Tibet, the hero is born with a bull's head and tail and given the name Masang Yharu Khadra. He meets his companions (a man with face as black as wood bark, another with face as blue as the grasslands, and the third with face as pale as a rock). He is betrayed in the same manner and escapes the hole by climbing up three peach trees. When he meets the girl, he follows her and climbs up a rose vine to the sky, where he meets the leader of the gods of heaven, who enlists Masang's help. The next day, the forces of heaven assume the shape of white yaks and fight the demonic forces, who are in the shape of black yaks.

In a Russian language translation by Tibetologist Yuri Parfionovich, the hero's name is given as "Пегий бычок" (English: "Piebald Bull Calf"), and its source is explicitly named "Игра Веталы с человеком" ("Vetala's Game with a Man").

== Analysis ==
=== Parallels ===
Folklorist William Ralston Shedden-Ralston called Massang the "Calmuck Minotaur", in reference to the hybrid bull-man creature of Greek myth. Charles Fillingham Coxwell also related Massang to the Greek Minotaur.

Coxwell saw a parallel between Massang and Lorraine (French) hero "John of the Bear" (Jean de l'Ours), another strong hero with animal parentage.

Hungarian scholarship argue for a parallel between the Kalmyk Massang and a similar figure of Hungarian folktales: Fehérlófia ('Son of the White Mare'), a youth born of a white mare.

=== Tale type ===
W. R. S. Ralston related the story to an international narrative wherein a hero, joined by two companions (his brothers or not), follows a creature to its underground lair; the hero is lowered by a rope and finds down there either kidnapped princesses or some treasure. Either way, the hero is abandoned by the other two in the underground to perish, but eventually escapes and punishes his traitorous companions. These tales were later classified in the international index Aarne-Thompson-Uther as tale type ATU 301, The Three Stolen Princesses (or The Three Underground Kingdoms, in Russian academia).

According to philologist researcher Irina S. Nadbitova, from the Kalmyk Institute for Humanities research RAS, a similar narrative exists in the Kalmyk Folktale Corpus, but the bull-man hero is disenchanted by a girl at the end of the tale. Nadbitova classified it as type 430, "Юноша-бык" ("The Bull Youth").

=== Other motifs ===
The little old woman who attacks the heroes is described as a Schimnu or Schumnu, which the translator considered to be a version of Mara, a demonic being in Buddhism.

Lörincz suggests that the coloured companions in the Tibetan tale may represent guardian spirits of the woods, the meadows and the mountains, or be interpreted as indications of the cardinal directions. Also, the heavenly deity or king, named Dbaṅ-po brgya-byin in the Tibetan text, is equivalent to Sanskrit Śatakratu, that is, Indra.

==== The birth of the constellation ====
The second part of the tale of "ox-man" Massang (or Masn Mirü) involves his fight against a powerful enemy king and the origin of a constellation. However, scholarship suggests that this second part is an addition to the original tale. Scholarship points out that the story of Massang serves as an etiological tale to the origin of a seven-star constellation known as "Долон Эбуген" ("Seven Elders") or "Долан Бурхн" ("Seven Deities"). According to Hungarian orientalist László L. Lőrincz, the tale is another myth to explain the origin of the Great Bear.

== See also ==
- Prâslea the Brave and the Golden Apples (Romanian fairy tale)
- The Story of Bensurdatu (Italian fairy tale)
- Dawn, Midnight and Twilight (Russian fairy tale)
- The Gnome (German fairy tale)
- The Norka (Russian fairy tale)
- Jihaguk daejeok toechi seolhwa (Korean folktale)
- The Son of a Horse (Chinese folktale)
