= Fehérlófia (folk tale) =

Hungarian folk tale

Folk tale
- Name: Fehérlófia
- Also known as: The Son of the White Horse; The Son of the White Mare
- Aarne–Thompson grouping: ATU 301 (Three Stolen Princesses)
- Region: Hungary
- Published in: Eredeti népmesék by László Arany (1862)
- Related: Jean de l'Ours; Three Princesses

Fehérlófia (lit. The Son of the White Horse or The Son of the White Mare) is a Hungarian folk tale published by László Arany in Eredeti Népmesék (1862). Its main character is a youth named Fehérlófia, a "Hungarian folk hero".

The tale is classified in the Aarne–Thompson–Uther Index as tale type ATU 301, "The Three Stolen Princesses", but the Hungarian National Catalogue of Folktales (MNK) classifies the tale as AaTh 301B.

== Summary ==
It was, it was not, a white mare that nurses its own human child for fourteen years, until he is strong enough to uproot a tree. The mare dies and the boy departs to see the world. He wrestles with three other equally strong individuals: Fanyüvő, Kőmorzsoló and Vasgyúró. The four strike a friendship and move to a hut in the forest. They set an arrangement: one should stay in the hut and cook the food while the others hunt.

One day, a little man or dwarf named Hétszűnyű Kapanyányimonyók. He invades the hut and beats Fehérlófia's companions to steal the food (a cauldron of porridge). Fehérlófia meets the dwarf and traps his beard in a tree trunk. The hero leads his friends to the dwarf's location but he seems to have escaped to somewhere. Fehérlófia and the other heroes follow after and find a pit or a hole that leads deep underground.

After his companion feel too frightened to descend, Fehérlófia himself climbs down a rope (a basket) to the underground. Down there, he finds the dwarf, who points him to three castles in this vast underworld: one of copper, the second of silver and the third of gold. Inside every castle, there is a lovely princess, a captive of a serpentine or draconic enemy. Féherlofia rescues the princess of the copper castle by killing her three-headed dragon captor and goes to rescue her sisters, the princess in the silver castle and the maiden of the golden castle.

He kills the seven-headed dragon in the silver palace and the twelve-headed dragon of the golden palace. Then, all four return to the basket in order for the princesses to return to the upper world. Féherlófia lets the princess go first, since the four of them would impair the ascent of the basket. Some time later, the basket does not return to retrieve Fehérlófia, so he wanders about in the underworld and sees a nest of griffins chicks. He uses a bush to create a protection from the rain and the griffin bird arrives to thank him. The human hero says he could use some help to return to the upper world. The griffin is happy to oblige, but he needs to be fed on the way up.

Near the end of the ascent, Fehérlófia discovers the food supplies are gone, so, out of desperation, slices his own hand and leg to feed the bird. When they land, the griffin is astonished at the human's sacrifice, so it gives him a vial of magical liquid to restore his strength. A restored Fehérlófia, then, searches for his traitorous companions to teach them a lesson. The trio is shocked to see their fallen companion back from the underworld and die of fright. Fehérlófia takes the princesses to their father and marries the youngest.

== Variants ==
=== Europe ===
In a tale collected in the Vend Romani dialect, the youth is the son of a "white horse", but the narration says the boy's father lifts the giant tree with a finger. Regardless, the boy is nursed by his mother for 21 years and finally uproots the tree. He travels the world and meets four other companions: Cliff-breaker, Hill-roller, Pine-twister and Iron-kneader. When he descends to the underworld, he rescues four princesses in the copper, silver, gold and diamond castles. Three of his companions marry three of the princesses, and the story concludes with the hero revealing Iron-kneader's betrayal and marrying the diamond princess.

A Romani-Bukovina variant, titled Mare's Son, shows many identical elements with the Hungarian tale: the hero's supernatural birth (by a mare); the mare nursing the boy; the tree uproot test; the three companions (Tree-splitter, Rock-splitter and Tree-bender); the small-sized man who steals the food; the descent to the underworld; the rescue of the eagle nest and the escape on the eagle's back. However, in the Underworld, Mare's Son puts the escaped dwarf in the basket and helps an elderly couple against an evil fairy that stole their eyes. Its collector and publisher, scholar Francis Hindes Groome, noted that the tale was "clearly defective", lacking the usual elements, despite the parallels with several other stories.

==== Hungary ====
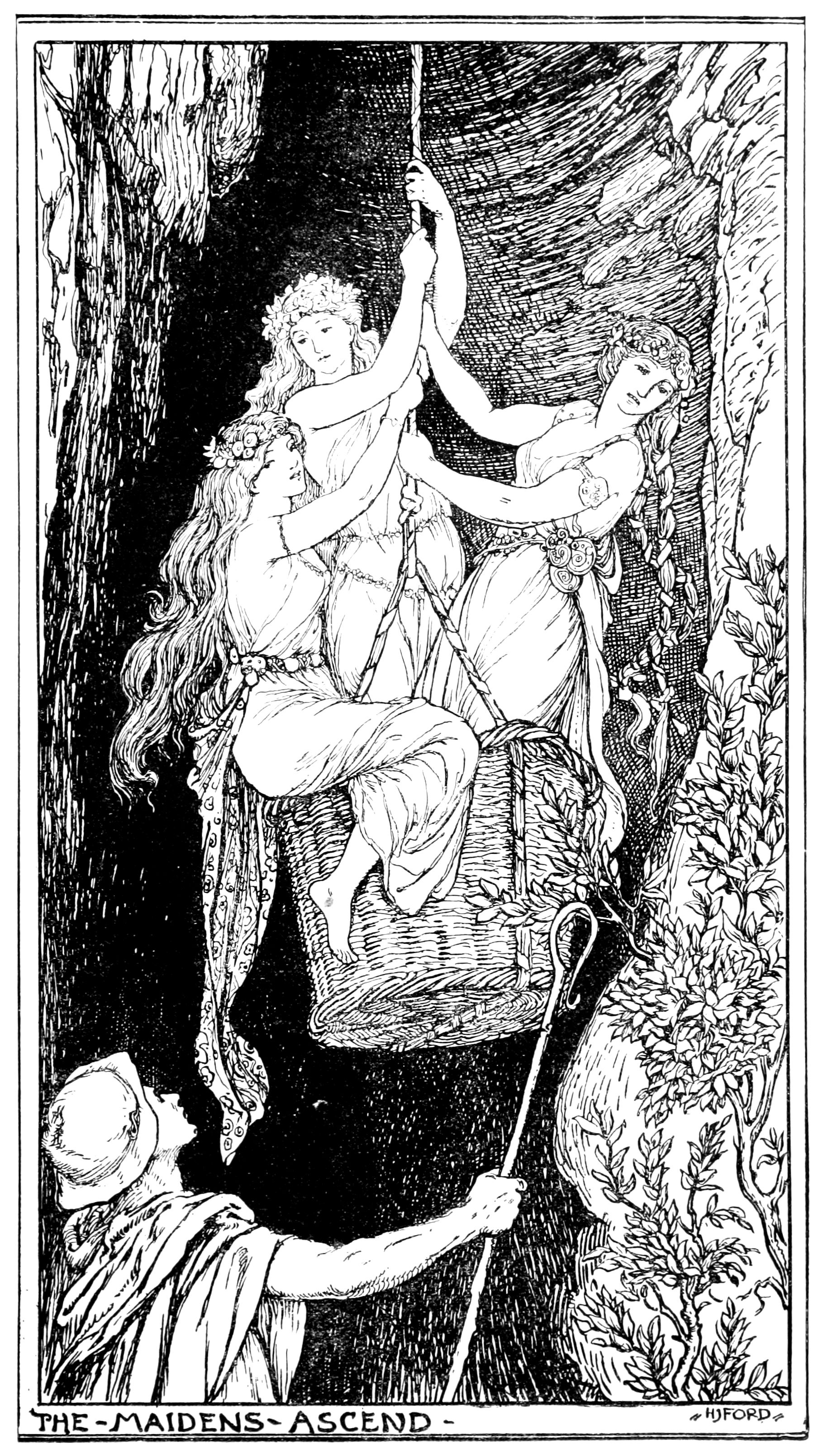
Shepherd Paul watches as the princesses are roped to the upper world. Illustration by Henry Justice Ford for The Crimson Fairy Book (1903).

In another Hungarian tale, collected by János Erdélyi with the title Juhász Palkó or Shepherd Paul, a shepherd finds a two-year-old boy in a meadow and names him Paul. He gives the boy to a ewe to suckle, and the boy develops great strength to uproot a tree after fourteen years. Paul goes to travel the world and meet three equally strong companions: Tree-Comber, Stone-Crusher and Iron-Kneader. They strike a friendship and set an arrangement: one will stay at home while the others go hunt some game. Paul's three companions stay home and are attacked by a dwarf that steals their food. Paul defeats the dwarf and ties his giant beard to a giant tree. Paul scolds his companions and wants to show them the defeated foe, but he has vanished. They soon follow him to an opening that leads underground. Paul descends, enters three castles, kills three many-headed dragons, liberates three princesses and transforms the castles into golden apples with a magic wand. The last dragon he kills was the dwarf in the surface, under a different form. Paul is betrayed by his companions, protects a nest of griffins with his cloak and their father takes him to the surface after a three-day journey. After he rests a while, the hero goes after his traitorous companions, kills them and marries the youngest princess.

==== Russia ====
In a Russian tale collected by Russian folklorist Ivan Khudyakov with the name "Иванъ - Кобьлинъ сынъ" and translated as Ivan the Mare's Son, from Riazan district, an old peasant couple buys a small mare from twelve brothers. Later, the old man buys a fine colt from a gentleman and forgets about the little mare. Feeling dejected, the mare flies away to the open steppes and gives birth to a human boy named Ivan, who grows by the hour. The human boy fixes some food and water for his equine mother and goes on a journey to rescue the tsar's daughter, kidnapped by an evil twelve-headed serpent. He meets two companions on the road, Mount-Bogatyr and Oak-Bogatyr, and they set for the entrance to the serpent's underground lair (this version lacks the episode of the little man and the hut). Ivan the Mare's Son descends the well, kills the serpent and rescues the tsar's daughter. His companions betray him and abandon him underground. Very soon (and suddenly), twelve doves appear and offer to take Ivan back to the surface (acting as the eagle of the other variants). After he arrives, he sees that his mother has died and ravens are pecking its body. He captures of the ravens as help in unmasking his traitorous companions.

==== Mari people ====
Hungarian scholarship located a similar tale of the horse-born hero among the Mari people. In a Hungarian translation of the tale, titled Vültak, a fehér kanca fia ("Vültak, The Son of the White Mare"), hero Vültak is born of a white mare. He joins forces with two companions, Tölcsak ("Son of the Moon") and Kecsamös ("Son of the Sun"), and each of them marries a maiden. The three couples live together, until one day a strange personage tries to enter their house, but Vültak dismisses him. Some time later, the strange man beats the three heroes to a pulp and kidnaps their wives to his underground lair. Vültak's mother, the white mare, heals the trio at the cost of her own life. Vültak descends to the underground with a rope, rescues the girls and defeats the villain (whose soul was hidden outside his body).

==== Czech Republic ====
A similar tale, Neohrožený Mikeš was recorded in today's Czech Republic by Božena Němcová. While some of the elements are missing, it follows the same general plot - Mikeš the main hero, a blacksmith's son, was nursed by his mother for 18 years, and as such developed enormous strength. After forging himself a club out of 7 quintals of iron, he sets out; on the way he's joined by two companions, named Kuba and Bobeš. They learn of three kidnapped princesses and decide to rescue them. Staying in a cave, a dwarf appears to each of them and attempts to kill them; however, Mikeš defeats him and takes his beard. He turns into an old woman, who tells them the princesses were kidnapped by a dragon and held in the underworld, and leads them to the entrance. Mikeš enters using a rope, finds two of the princesses, and using a magical candle defeats the creatures guarding them. The princesses are rescued, but the companions betray Mikeš by attempting to drop him to his death; he is warned and attaches his club instead. He then defeats the dragon and saves the third princess, who turned out to be the old woman. Together, they return to the princess's castle, where they prevent the marriage of the other two sisters and the treacherous companions - who flee, never to be seen again.

==== Literary variants ====
According to scholarship, Romanian author Ion Creanga used similar plot elements to write his literary tale Făt-frumos, fiul iepei ("Făt-Frumos, Son of the Mare"), or Prince Charming, the Mare's Son.

== Analysis ==
=== Classification ===
According to scholar Ágnes Kovács, the tale belongs to type AaTh 301B, "The Strong Man and his Companions". (Note: It should be noted, however, that the third revision of the Aarne-Thompson classification system, made in 2004 by German folklorist Hans-Jörg Uther, subsumed both subtypes AaTh 301A and AaTh 301B into the new type ATU 301.) She also stated that Fehérlófia was "one of the most popular Hungarian tales", with more than 50 variants. A recension by scholar Gabriella Kiss, in 1968, listed 64 variants across Hungarian sources. Fieldwork conducted in 1999 by researcher Zoltán Vasvári amongst the Palóc population found 4 variants of the tale type.

Scholarship also sees considerable antiquity in the tale. For instance, Gabriella Kiss stated that the tale "Son of the White Horse" belonged to the "archaic material of Hungarian folk-tales".

In regards to the journey on the back of a giant bird (an eagle or a griffin), folklorist scholarship recognizes its similarities with the tale of Etana helping an eagle, a tale type later classified as Aarne–Thompson–Uther ATU 537, "The Eagle as helper: hero carried on the wings of a helpful eagle".

=== Origins of the hero ===
In another tale of the same folktype, AaTh 301B ("The Strong Man and his Companions"), named Jean de l'Ours, the hero is born from a human woman and a bear. The human woman is sometimes lost in the woods and the animal finds her, or she is taken by the animal to its den. In a second variation, the hero is fathered by a lion and he is called Löwensohn ("The Lion's Son").

Professor Michael Meraklis cited that the episode of a lion or bear stealing a human woman and the hero born of this "living arrangement" must preserve "the original form of the tale", since it harks back to the ancient and primitive notion that humans and animals could freely interact in a mythical shared past.

In the Hungarian tale, however, the father is unknown, and the non-human parentage is attributed to a female animal (the white mare). This fantastical birth could be explained by the fact that the character of Fehérlófia was "originally a totem animal ancestor". This idea seems supported by the existence of other Hungarian tales with a horse- or mare-born hero (like Lófia Jankó and Lófi Jankó) - a trait also shared by Turkish and Chuvash tales (Note: Bashkir folklorist Nur T. Zaripov published a tale from the Bashkirs (another Turkic people) with the title "Бузансы-батыр" ("Buzansy-Batyr"): an old couple have a gray mare named Buzbia that gives birth to a human boy after a harsh winter. The boy is raised by the human couple, given the name Buzansy-Batyr and meets companions in his youth. The tale then veers into tale type ATU 513A, "How Six Made Their Way Through the World".) - and the existence of peoples that claim descent from a mythical equine ancestor. A similar conclusion has been reached in regards to the animal-born hero of Russian folktales: the hero "magically born from a totem" represents "the oldest character type".

By comparing Romanian variants of type 301 to international tales, French philologist Jean Boutière, in his doctoral thesis, surmised that "much more often (especially in the West)", the hero is born of a union between a woman and a bear, but elsewhere, "notably in the East", the hero is the son of a mare, a she-donkey or even of a cow.

=== Parallels ===
Professor Mihály Hoppál's study, titled Feherlófia, found "Eastern parallels" to the tale across the Eurasian steppes, in Mongols and Turkic peoples of Inner Asia and in Kyrgyz folklore (namely, the Er Töstük epic). Also, according to him, the story of Fehérlófia does not have parallels in Europe, but belongs to a select group of tale types shared by Hungary and other Asian peoples. In another article, he states that the type "can be traced all the way to the Far East (including the Yugur, Daur, Mongol and Turkic peoples of Central Asia)".

In the same vein, professor Tünde Tancz says the type "belongs to the fairy tale area of West Asia", a region that encompasses "the repertoire of Finno-Ugric peoples and many Turkic peoples". Similarly, researcher Izabella Horváth argues that the tale shows great parallels to tales from Osmali Turks, Uigurs, Kazaks, Yugurs and Kyrgyz.

Parallels have also been argued between Fehérlófia and other Inner Asian stories that follow the same narrative sequence and involve an animal-born hero, in particular an Asian tale from the collection of Vetala (also known as The Bewitched Corpse Cycle) about a cow-born hero.

== Adaptations ==
The tale was used as the plot of the 1981 Hungarian animated fantasy film Fehérlófia ("Son of the White Mare"), by film director Marcell Jankovics.

== See also ==
- Hungarian mythology
- Prâslea the Brave and the Golden Apples (Romanian fairy tale)
- The Story of Bensurdatu (Italian fairy tale)
- Dawn, Midnight and Twilight (Russian fairy tale)
- The Gnome (German fairy tale)
- The Norka (Russian fairy tale)
- Miloš Obilić, legendary Serbian hero
- The Son of a Horse (Chinese folktale)
