= The Son of a Horse =

Folktale from the Salar people

The Son of the Horse is a folktale from the Salar people, an ethnic minority in China. It concerns a hero of animal parentage and his adventures with two companions. Similar stories are located in China, among its ethnic minorities.

The tale is related, in the international Aarne-Thompson-Uther Index, to type ATU 301, "The Three Stolen Princesses".

== Summary ==
A family owns a black mare. One day, the owner finds the mare in labour in the stables. She foals a young boy. The owner takes the boy to the imam, who names him Ma Shengbao ("Baby Born of a Horse"). The owner adopts him as his own son, and he learns kung fu and archery.

Years later, Ma Shengbao decides to leave home to find himself some brothers. In his wanderings, he sees smoke coming off a tree and shoots an arrow at it. A man comes out of the tree and says that Ma Shengbao broke his pot, but both become sworn brothers. Next, the duo walks on until they see smoke coming out of a rock. Ma Shengbao shoots an arrow at it. A man comes out of the rock and says Ma Shengbao broke his cooking pot. They decide to become sworn brothers.

Now a trio, the man from the tree is called Big Brother, the man from the stone becomes Second Brother, and Ma Shengbao is called Little Brother (by degree of seniority). They live and hunt together. One time, when they return home, they find a meal prepared for them. They decide to be on the lookout in turns to discover who made it.

Big Brother finds out that three doves fly in, become human maidens, prepare the food for the men, and fly back. Big Brother does not report the fact to his companions. The same happens to Second Brother. Ma Shengbao, Little Brother, spies on the dove maidens, takes their feathers and burns them to have them become humans permanently.

The dove maidens introduce themselves as a trio of sisters, the first named Ayi Ana, the second Yulutusi Ana, and the third Guni Ana. Guni Ana is the most beautiful of the three, but she smears her face with soot to hide her beauty. Ma Shengbao's companions decide to marry the maidens, while he gets to stay with Guni Ana.

Some time later, the maidens are cooking food at home, when a chicken comes out of nowhere, flutters its wings and snuffs out the fire in the hearth. The maidens leave home to look for another source of fire, and see smoke coming out of a cave. They enter the cave and a demoness, disguised as an old woman, gives them a piece of hot coal and a pouch of fruit.

The maidens go back home; their fruit pouch rips open and pieces fall one after the other, creating a trail for the demoness to follow. The old woman tricks the maidens into allowing them to delouse their hair, but in fact she begins to suck their blood. Ma Shengbao and his companions notice that their wives are looking weak, emaciated and pale for the past days, and decide to investigate.

Big Brother stays on the lookout and sees the demoness sucking the maidens' blood, but reports nothing to his companions. The same happens to Second Brother. Ma Shengbao discovers the truth and injures the demoness with his bow and arrow. Hurt, the demoness kidnaps Guni Ana and flees, leaving a trail of blood.

Ma Shengbao follows the trail to a cave and asks his companions to rope him into the hole. Down there, he finds his wife, Guni Ana, who tells him to hide, since the demoness will come back soon. Ma Shengbao and Guni Ana kill the demoness, and he takes his wife to the rope, along with the devil's treasure. Ma Shengbao's companions lift the maiden and the treasure, but leave him stranded underground.

Ma Shengbao wanders off underground, but falls exhausted and sleeps. When he wakes up, a snake threatens a young eagle, but the youth saves the bird by killing the snake. In gratitude, the young eagle carries him to its eagle parents atop a tree. The eagle mother agrees to lift him back home, but it must be fed a hundred sparrows for it to complete the journey.

Ma Shengbao manages to capture 99 sparrows, and begins the journey on the eagle's back. After exhausting the sparrows, Ma Shengbao cuts off part of his leg to feed the eagle near the end of the journey. After they land, the eagle notices that the youth is limping, and scolds him.

Ma Shengbao hobbles back home and stops to rest by a well, when he sees a woman coming to fetch water. The woman, Guni Ana, recognizes the man as her husband, and explains his companions are mistreating her. Ma Shengbao comes home disguised as a tattered man, and finds his two companions practicing martial arts in the garden. Ma Shengbao challenges and beats them. Defeated, Big Brother and Second Brother flee with their wives, leaving Ma Shengbao and Guni Ana. The pair lives happily.

== Analysis ==
=== Tale type ===
The tale is related, in the international Aarne-Thompson-Uther Index, to tale type ATU 301, "The Three Stolen Princesses" and its subtypes: a hero - often having an animal parentage - finds two companions, climbs down a hole and rescues three maidens from their underground captivity; he is betrayed by his companions and trapped underground, but eventually finds a way out back to the surface - usually by flying on an eagle's back.

According to Chinese folklorist and scholar Ting Nai-tung, tale type 301 in China forms its own cycle of variants, including those from the ethnic minorities of China.

=== Motifs ===
The women that become birds and vice-versa represent the international motif of the swan maiden: females that alternate between avian and human shapes by the use of a feather cloak or garment. However, Ting Nai-tung supposed that this motif was "unknown to other Chinese versions of AT 301".

The episode of the journey on the eagle's back is parallel to similar events in many fairy tales, where a hero needs to feed pieces of meat to the eagle (or another mythical bird) for the remainder of the journey, otherwise it will not complete its flight. In this regard, folklorist scholarship recognizes its similarities with the tale of Etana helping an eagle, a tale type later classified as Aarne–Thompson–Uther ATU 537, "The Eagle as helper: hero carried on the wings of a helpful eagle".

== Variants ==
=== China ===
According to Chinese scholarship, stories of the horse-born hero are found among the nomadic and hunting peoples of northern and western China. Across ten ethnic groups, eight stories contain the hero's miraculous birth from a horse. The existence of the motif is attributed to the importance of the horse for the normadic peoples in ancient times, their survival and prosperity.

In a tale from the Hui people, recorded in 1981 in Xinjiang, Horse Brother, the Cultivator, an old woman has an old horse that brings home a boy. She decides to adopt him and calls him Horse Brother. Years later, after he becomes a great archer, he shoots an arrow at a rock and a fat man comes out of it which he names Stone Brother; he shoots at an elm tree and a slim man comes out of it which he names Elm Brother. The trio journey together and settle at the foot of Bogota Mountain. They build a house and cultivate the land, but lament on the lack of wives for them. On one occasion, after they return from a hunt, they see that the meal has been prepared and the house clean. They take turns to see who is behind this: both Stone Brother and Elm Brother fall asleep; Horse Brother discovers it its three pigeons that descend and become three maidens with white garments. Horse Brother convinces them to become their wives. The tale continues as a creature called Nine-heads Master slowly drains their blood during some time and is defeated by Horse Brother.

Ting Nai-tung summarized a tale from the Tu people, which circulated in Qinghai-Gansu. In this tale, the hero is born of a horse and adopted by an old woman. Years later, he meets two equally extraordinary companions and they discover a deserted house where food is cooked overnight. The trio decide to find out who is responsible for this, and see three dove maidens entering the house and becoming humans. The heroes convince the maidens to marry them, and one of the main hero's companions bring his mother to live with them. Some time later, a nine-headed ogre comes and steals the food, and the hero goes after him to kill it with the help of a young shepherd boy.

Ting Nai-tung summarized a tale from the Daur people, which circulated in Heilongjiang. In this tale, the hero lacks the animal origin. Three maidens come to the heroes' house in the form of peacocks. The heroes steal their garments and force the girls to marry them. The three couples live together, until an ogress comes to eat their food and suck the maidens' blood. After his two companions fail to stop the ogress, the hero injures her and follows a trail of her blood to a cavern. He descends a rope to the lower world and finds another maiden washing clothes. The maiden tells him how to defeat the ogress: by locating and destroying the ogress's life, hidden in three animals. The hero does that and brings the maiden to the rope, but his companions cut off the rope and trap him underground. The hero restores a hurt Dragon Prince to health and it takes the hero out of the cave.

==== Monguor people ====
In a tale from the Monguor people, collected from a Li Songduo in Huzhu, Black Horse Zhang, an old couple own a black mare that gives birth to a pack of flesh. They open it and find a human baby inside. They raise it as their son and name him Black Horse. Years later, he leaves home with arrow and a sword and travels the world. On his wanderings, he sees a column of smoke coming out of a stone. He shoots an arrow at a gap in the stone and a man comes under it. They become friends and he names the man Stone or Elder Brother. The same happens to a man living under a tree; this one they call Second Brother Wood. The trio decide to live together and build a cottage. Meanwhile, on the eighth day of the 4th lunar month, three fairy maidens from Heaven, seeing the beauty of the human world, decide to visit in the form of white doves. They alight by the men's cottage, prepare de food and clean the house, and flay away as doves. Soon after, the three hunters arrive home and, wondering at the mysterious housekeeper, try to discover their identity. Only Black Horse Zhang stays awake and discovers the maidens. The three fairy maidens marry the three hunters. One day, they are instructed to always give food to the cat, but they forget to do so, and the animal puts out the fire by sprinkling water with its tail. The fairy maidens go out to borrow coal from some nearby house. The third fairy sees in the distance a cave with some smoke coming out of it. She visits the cave and asks for some coal from its occupant, an old white-haired woman. The old woman agrees to give it, in return for the fairy to plant some rape seeds on her way back. After the exchange, she does as asked and the rape seeds grow into trees all the way to the fairies' house, creating a trail for the old woman to follow. The woman turns into a nine-headed demon, sucks the blood of the fairies, and hides in its cave. Black Horse Zhang and his companions work together to kill the monster.

In a Minhe Mangghuer tale, collected from informant Lü Jinliang with the name Madage or Old Brother Horse, an old woman with no sons plants a millet and watches over it. In a dream, she is told that near the horse trough a winter pear will fall down, which she shall eat to bear a son. However, her horse eats it and gives birth to a son. The old woman raises the son as her own and sends him to school. He is humiliated by other students and decides to make his own path in the world. He leaves home with a bow and arrows. He shoots at a tree and at a rock; a man comes out of each. They strike a friendship and Madage calls the one from the tree Shu'erge ("Second Brother Tree") and the one from the stone Shitouge ("Brother Stone"). They settle down near a sacred cave where there are three cuckoos. The trio alternate in the night shift. They notice that the three cuckoos become human maidens, so the trio burn their feather cloaks and marry them.

=== Tibet ===
In an Eastern Tibetan (Amdo) variant, The Mare's Boy, a mare gives birth to a human boy who is adopted by an old woman. He grows up and strikes a friendship with two other human companions. During a heavy storm, the trio take shelter in a nearby cave, on August 15. They see three pigeons enter the cave and become three goddesses. The women say their prayers, return to their pigeon bodies and fly away. The same event happens in the next two years. On the third year, Mare's Boy and his companions burn the pigeon bodies to force the goddesses to retain their human forms. They marry the three goddesses, who alert the humans spouses that disease will come to afflict the men and animals in the area. Times passes; the human hunters notice the goddesses are becoming pale and thin. One day, they wait outside the hut; they see a kite flying by and becoming a copper-nosed creature or witch. It sucks on the goddesses' blood and flies away again. Mare's Boy shoot an arrow at it, hurting the bird. They follow a trail of blood to a hole. Mare's Boy descends into the hole through a rope. The rope cuts off. He is now in a strange land. He meets the witch's son, who guards part of his mother's strength. He kills him, and goes next to the witch. He breaks the next item of external strength and defeats the witch. He leaves the witch's house and kills a snake that was menacing a nest of birds. Their father, the Garuda, in gratitude, decides to help him back to his realm.

=== Siberia ===
In a tale attributed to the Tungus of Siberia, also titled Ivan the Mare's Son (Russian: "Иван Кобыльников сын"), the mare escapes from its owners who wanted to eat it. After she rushes into a forest, she sees the corpse of a fallen Tungus warrior and licks it, becoming instantly pregnant with a human child, Ivan. He grows up and decides to leave his mother to see the world, but his mother advises him to always leave an arrow standing upwards in the ground as a token of his well-being. On his travels, he meets two similarly named individuals, Ivan the Sun's Son and Ivan the Moon's Son. The three decide to live together in a hut made of wooden poles and animal skins. For two nights, after they hunt in the forest, they come home and see the place in perfect order. On the third night, Ivan, the Mare's Son, decides to stay awake and discovers that three herons descending to the ground and taking off their feathers and wings to become maidens. Ivan, the Mare's Son, hides their bird garments until they reveal themselves. The Mare's Son, marries heron maiden Marfida, and her sisters the other two Ivans. They live together for some time, until a day when an evil serpent crawls out of a hole behind their house to suck on the blood of the wives. The Three Ivans expel the foe, but it returns the next day with a thunder cloud and an army of demons, kills the three heroes and take their wives down the hole. Ivan's mother, the mare, appears in the nick of time to revive her son and the others. Ivan the Mare's Son descends through a rope to the underworld, rescued Marfida and her sisters and kills the serpent. After he takes the heron maidens to the rope, the other Ivans cut the rope and abandon the Mare's Son in the underworld. The mare rescues her son again and acts as the eagle in this variant, asking for her son to feed her meat on the journey back to the world of the living.

=== Wakhi people ===
Russian philologist Aleksandr Gryunberg-Tsvetinovich and philologist Mikhail Ivanovich Steblin-Kamensky collected a tale from an informant that lived in Wakhan, with the title "Май-Зман" ("Mai-Zman"). In this tale, an old woman lives with her grandson and a sheep that gives birth every day to a lamb. Every day, its lambs are eaten by the boy and her grandmother. One day, the boy announces that he plans to eat the sheep, a decision agreed on by his grandmother. So, they lock the animal in a pen. A cat goes to talk to the sheep and reveals the humans plan to eat it bit by bit, and the cat wishes to eat the sheep's tail by stealing from the old woman's house. To save its life, the sheep offers to cut off its own tail for the cat, in exchange for its release. The cat brings a knife, the sheep cuts off the tail and flees to Mount Kof. There, safe at least, the sheep gives birth to a flock of lambs and eventually to a human boy. The boy, named Mai-Zman ("Son of the Sheep") grows up, and is ordered by his mother to live with humans. Before he leaves, the sheep-mother gives some hairs from its head for her son to call on her aid. In his wanderings, he meets three equally strong men: the first named Chinorboz ("Playing with trees"), Kuboz ("Playing with mountains") and Hdorgboz ("Playing with millstones"). Mai-Zman wrestles against each one and, defeating them, they become his sworn brothers and companions. Now a quartet, the four heroes find a deserted house and live there, and take turns hunting game for them and cooking their food. As time goes by, they notice that someone enters the house, prepares the food, grooms their hair and beards, then leaves. Mai-Zman's companions decide to be on the lookout, but find nothing. Mai-Zman stays awake and discovers a girl. He talks to his companions and they all agree he should have her as wife. Later, Mai-Zman warns his wife not to let the fire in their hearth to go out. However, it does happen and the girl needs to look for another source with a distant neighbour, an old woman named Barzangi. The old woman tricks the girl into removing lice from her hair and gives her a coal, then goes to her house and drinks the girl's blood. Mai-Zman notices his wife is becoming weaker and decides to investigate further: after his three companions fail to notice any strange presence, Mai-Zman discovers the Barzangi, which becomes a multi-headed monster. They engage in fierce and bloody combat, Mai-Zman cutting off Barzangi's heads until leaving only one. Mai-Zman's wife takes off the sheep's hair from her husband's belt and summons the sheep to restore the heroes, who follow the creature's blood trail to a hole that leads underground. His companions failing to go down the hole, Mai-Zman climbs down himself with a rope and meets a shepherd in the lower world that works for a pair of old people. The shepherd reveals that the lives of the three of them are hidden each in a louse. Mai-Zman smashes the louses, kills the shepherd and the old couple, then takes the shepherd's cattle to the rope. His companions pull the cattle out of the hole and leave the youth trapped underground. He then meets a Simurgh bird and takes out from its leg a thorn that became a forest. In gratitude, the Simurgh agrees to take Mai-Zman back to the surface.

== See also ==
- Jean de l'Ours
- Fehérlófia (Hungarian folk tale)
- The Adventures of Massang (Kalmyk folktale)
- Prâslea the Brave and the Golden Apples (Romanian fairy tale)
- The Story of Bensurdatu (Italian fairy tale)
- Dawn, Midnight and Twilight (Russian fairy tale)
- The Gnome (German fairy tale)
- The Norka (Russian fairy tale)
