= Hippolyte Babou =

French journalist, critic and novelist

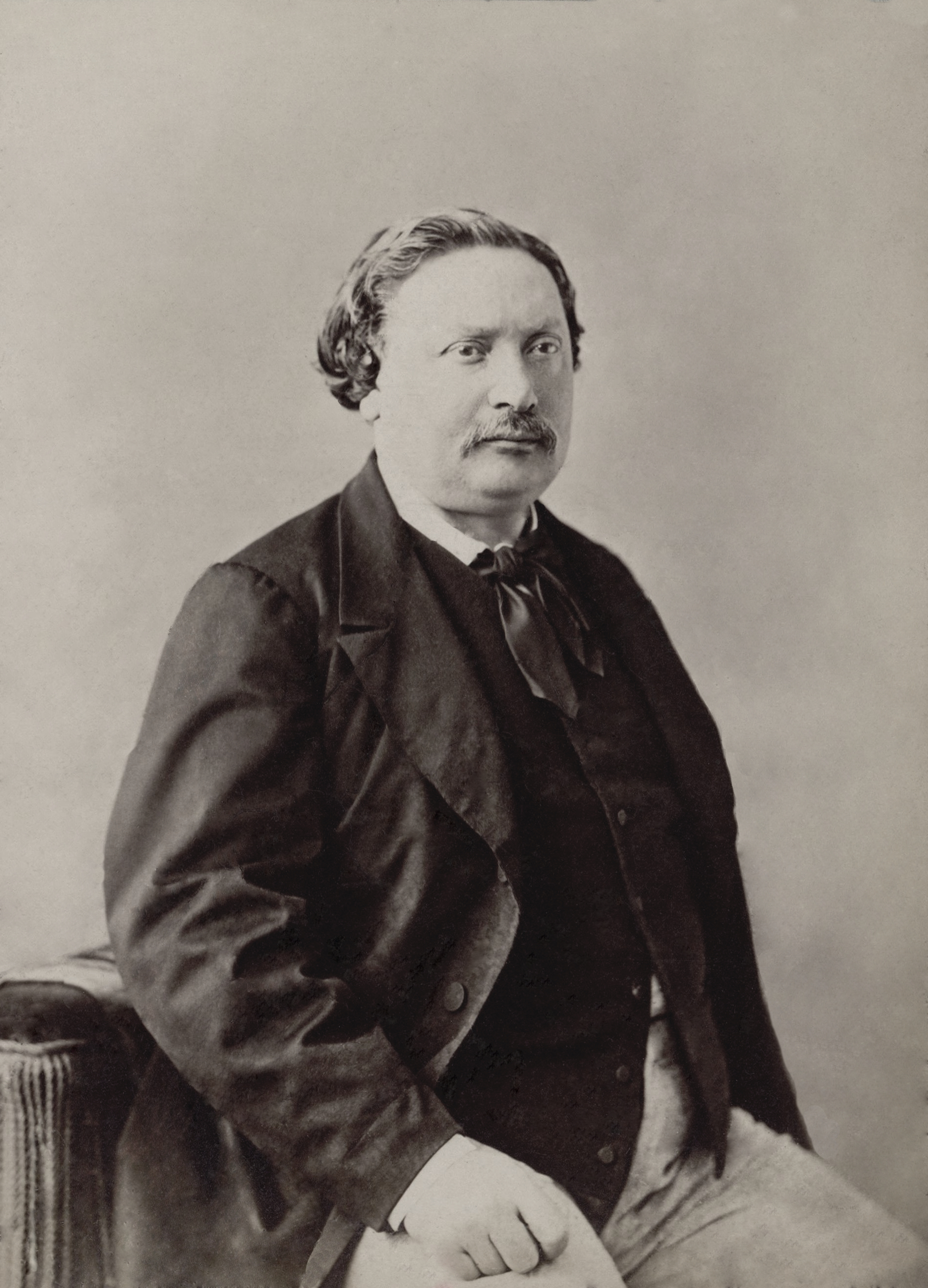
Hippolyte Babou

Hippolyte Babou (1824-1878) was a French journalist, critic and novelist. Babou also wrote as Jean-sans-Peur, and used the name Camille Lorrain for his journalism in Le Corsaire, Le Charivari, L'Illustration, La Patrie, and Revue de Paris.

Babou was born on 24 February 1824 in Peyriac, Aude.

A friend of Charles Baudelaire, Babou suggested the title 'Les Fleurs du mal' to Baudelaire at the end of 1854.

== Works ==
- La vérité sur le cas de M. Champfleury. Paris: Poulet-Malassis et de Broise, 1857.
- Les payens innocents; nouvelles. Paris: Poulet-Malassis et de Broise, 1858.
- Lettres satiriques et critiques. Paris: Poulet-Malassis et de Broise, 1860.
- Les amoureux de Madame de Sévigné. Les femmes vertueuses du grand siècle. Paris: Didier, 1862.
- (as Jean-sans-Peur) L'homme à la lanterne. Paris: Thézard, 1868.
- Les sensations d'un juré: vingt figures contemporaines. Paris: A. Lemerre, 1875.
- Les prisonniers du Deux-décembre: mes émotions, mes souvenirs. Paris: Decaux, 1876.
