= Zhalmauyz Kempir =

Kazakh folk figure

Zhalmauyz Kempir (Kazakh: Жалмауыз Кемпір) is a female personage of Kazakh folk tales, a witch. According to Nora K. Chadwick and Viktor Zhirmunsky, the character appears in the non-epic traditions of the Turkic peoples under several names, e.g., Jelmogus, Dshalmaus and Jel Maja.

== In Kazakh folklore ==
Kazakh oral tradition describes Zhalmauyz Kempir as an old ugly hag often with some grotesque features such as seven heads, sharp claws, one eye, hooves. She possesses supernatural strength, magic power, superspeed, etc.

Zhalmauyz Kempir is described as a witch with magic power who can change her shape at will. She is also said to be a cannibal or to suck blood like a vampire.

Unlike other witches of Kazakh folklore, such as Albasty and Zheztyrnaq, Zhalmauyz Kempir has an ambiguous role, not only of the absolute evil, but also of a kind helper, because in some cases she can be helpful to character in a fairy tale. However, in her usual depiction she acts like a witch and practices nefarious acts: being a local horror, killing people and eating human flesh, kidnapping children.

== In Uzbek folklore ==
A similar character appears in Uzbek folklore, named Jalmoʏiz kampir ("The Old Woman Jalmogiz").

== Sources ==
- Interpreting Zhalmauyz Kempir in Monstrous femininity in Kazakh folklore: delineating normative and transgressive womanhood, thesis by Inzhuna Karazhanova, 2016, pp. 57-82
- Zhalmauyz Kempir in the book 'Myths of the world' (in Russian)
- Жалмауыз Кемпир // Мифологический словарь. - М.: "Советская Энциклопедия"б 1991б 736 с. - P. 214 (in Russian)
