= Jean-Claude Pertuzé =

French writer and illustrator (1949–2020)

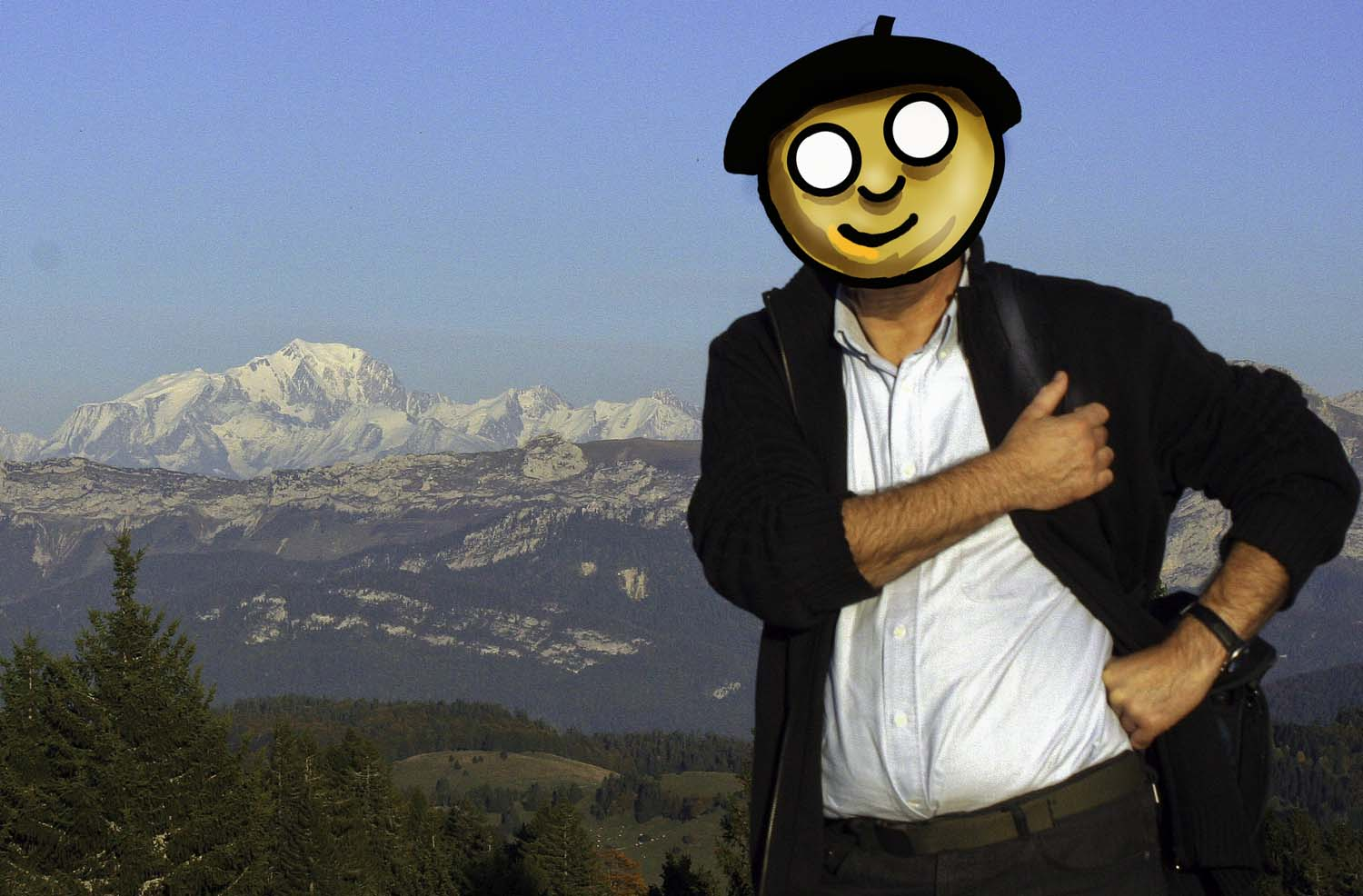
- Self-portrait of Pertuzé (2007), with his face replaced by a Pertucon
- Born: 11 September 1949; Lectoure, France
- Died: 26 April 2020 (aged 70); Valence, France
- Occupation: Comic book artist

Jean-Claude Pertuzé (11 September 1949 – 26 April 2020) was a French comic book artist, illustrator, and writer.

== Publications ==
=== Comics in the Press ===
- L’Ort vert, Haga (1974)
- Métal hurlant (1978, 1979, 1980)
- Les histoires de Papi Repapiol (1978–1980)
- La Dépêche du Midi (1984)
- Circus (1985)
- Aventures de M. de Bistodénas (1986)
- Tournesol
- Les Clés de l’actualité

=== Comic Books ===
- Contes de Gascogne (1977)
- Les Chants de Pyrène (1981–1984)
- Galipettes (1985)
- Culbutes (1987)
- Le Jour du Vignemale (1987)
- Brassens, 1957-1962 : l'Amandier (1990)
- L'Apôtre Zéro (1993)
- Capotages (1994)
- La fille du Capitoul (2004)
- Mirguette et Toustounet (2005)
- Vignemale, l’autre jour (2011)
- Black Mountain, Le Louglier (2013)
- Voyage au centre des Pyrénées (2014)

=== Illustrative Works ===
- E nos fotèm d'èstre mortals
- Petite histoire de Toulouse
- Sorcières et sabbats de Gascogne
- Les Carnets de Bernadou
- Chroniques démoniaques et drolatiques (1987)
- La Révolution à Toulouse (1989)
- Petite Chronique de la Boue (1990)
- Panthéon Pyrénéen (1990)

Robinson Crusoé dans les Pyrénées (1995)

- Gascogne céleste (1999)
- Gloires de Gascogne (2000)
- les Nouvelles (2000)
- A Bisto de Nas (2002)
- Hilh de Pute Macarel (2003)
- Caram ! Aixo me mira (2004)
- Amour courtois et Libertinage (2004)
- La Bise et l'Autan (2005)
- L'Herbier érotique (2005)
- Contes, légendes et récits de la vallée d'Aure (2006)
- Gascons à table (2007)
- Sur les pas de Bladé (2008)
- Contes populaires de la Gascogne (2008)
- Mon sabot de verre (2008)
- Contes, légendes et récits du Louron et des Bareilles (2009)
- L'Anniversaire (2012)
- Contes populaires du Languedoc (2012)
- Traité du Fouet, ou Aphrodisiaque externe (2013)
- Le Dernier Voyage (2015)
- Le Guide des prénoms occitans (2015)
- Destins croisés (1914-1918) (2016)

=== Youth Publications ===
- Le conte de Jean de l'Ours (1988)
- Rampono (1993)
- Les Petites Mains
- Gros-Louis
- Bos de Bénac
- Dame Carcas
- Trencavel
- Pierrot et le secret des cailloux à feu (1999)
- Malika la petite indienne (1999)
- Julot sur le Canal du Midi (2001)
- Activités Nature pour les 5-8 ans (2003)
- Le Voleur de Temps
- Mirguette et Toustounet (2005)
- Petites Créations et récréations (2007)
- Lire un conte à la carte (2012, 2013)

== Exhibitions ==
- En passant par la Gascogne (1979)
- Le Robinson des Pyrénées (1995)
- Les Ormes (2000)
- BD Comminges (2011)
- Le monde de Pertuzé (2014)

== Awards ==
- Prix Prosper-Estieu (2006)
