= Blacos =

- Municipality
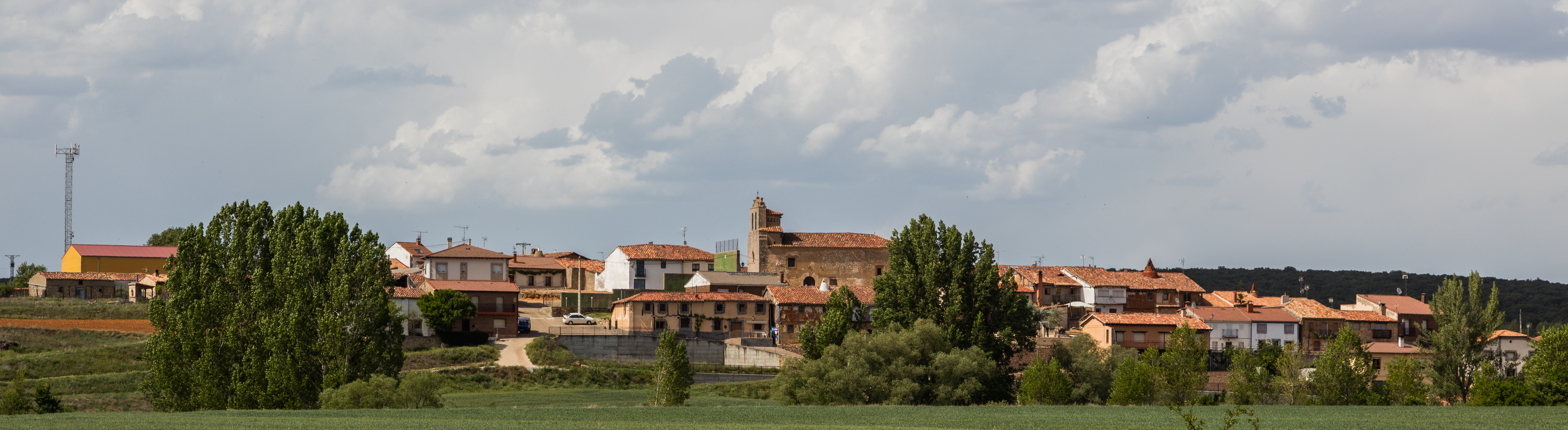

- Location in Spain. Blacos (Spain)
- Country: Spain
- Autonomous community: Castile and León
- Province: Soria
- Municipality: Blacos

Area
  - Total: 17 km^{2} (6.6 sq mi)
- Elevation: 1,044 m (3,425 ft)

Population (2025-01-01)
  - Total: 36
  - Density: 2.1/km^{2} (5.5/sq mi)
- Time zone: UTC+1 (CET)
  - Summer (DST): UTC+2 (CEST)
- Website: Official website

Blacos is a municipality located in the province of Soria, Castile and León, Spain. According to the Municipal Register of Spain, in 2018 the municipality had a population of 44.
