= Emmanuel Cosquin =

French folklorist (1841–1919)

Letter from Cosquin (1912)

Emmanuel Cosquin (1841 – 1919) was a French folklorist. He wrote the Popular Tales of Lorraine, in the introduction to which he argues for the theory that the development as well as the origin of such tales is historically traceable to India.

== Publications ==
- Contes populaires de Lorraine (Paris, 1860) - two volumes
- Les Contes indiens et l'occident: petites monographies folkloriques à propos de contes Maures. Paris: Édouard Champion. 1922.
