= Waligóra and Wyrwidąb =

Legendary Polish twin brothers

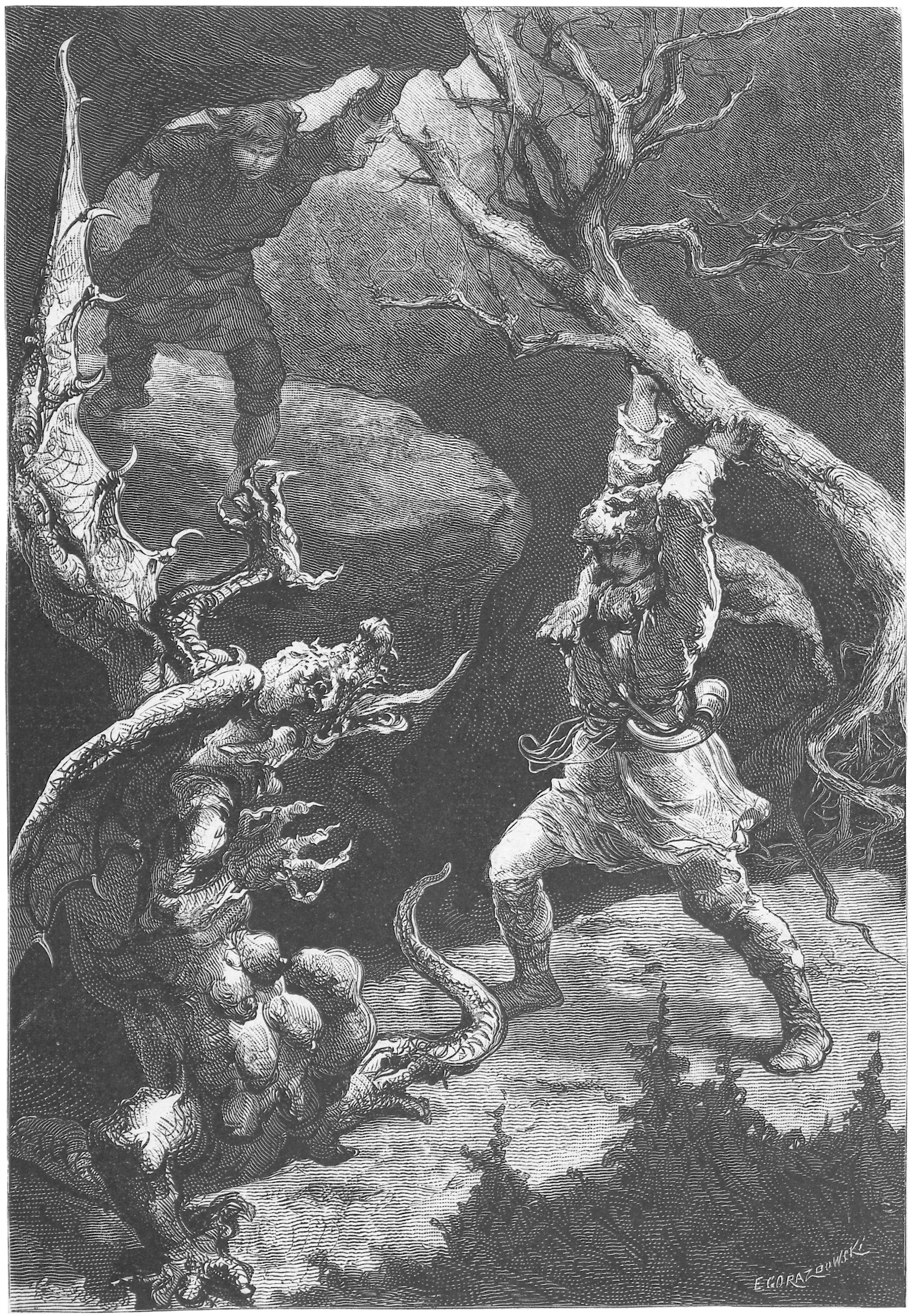
Illustration Waligóra and Wyrwidąb by Michał Elwiro Andriolli in the 1876 book Klechdy, starożytne podania i powieści ludowe by Kazimierz Władysław Wóycicki

Waligóra (Note: Polish pronunciation: [va.liˈɡu.ra]; lit. 'the one who topples mountains') and Wyrwidąb (Note: Polish pronunciation: [vɘ̟rˈvi.dɔmp]; lit. 'the one who tears oaks from the ground') are two fictional twin brothers in a fairy tale originating from Poland. They are a personification of brotherhood and an example of the benefits of cooperation.

== In fairy tales ==
In one version of their fairy tale, they were orphans whose mother died after birth in the forest. Waligóra was cared for by the female wolf, while Wyrwidąb, by the female bear. They were both extremely strong, with Waligóra being capable of destroying the mountain with one punch, and Wyrwidąb, being able to tear oak trees from the ground. The brothers worked together to save a kingdom, defeating the dragon that terrorized it. Afterwards, they were rewarded by the king, who let them marry his two daughters.

Philologist and folklorist Julian Krzyżanowski, establisher of the Polish Folktale Catalogue according to the international index, classified tales about the heroic duo as type T 300B, "Smok I Waligóra" ("The Dragon and Waligóra"). Thus, his typing is closely related to the international ATU type ATU 300, "The Dragon-Slayer".

=== In other fairy tales ===
According to philologist and folklorist Julian Krzyżanowski (pl), Waligóra and Wyrwidąb may also be the name of the companions of the hero in the Aarne-Thompson-Uther Index type ATU 301, "The Three Stolen Princesses" or Polish Bracia zdradziecy ("The Traitorous Brothers").

== Citations ==
=== Bibliography ===
- Kazimierz Władysław Wójcicki, Waligóra i Wyrwidąb in Klechdy, starożytne podania i powieści ludowe, Grudziądz, Zakłady Graficzne Wiktora Kulerskiego (Gazeta Grudziądzka), 1922
