= The Gnome (fairy tale) =

German fairy tale

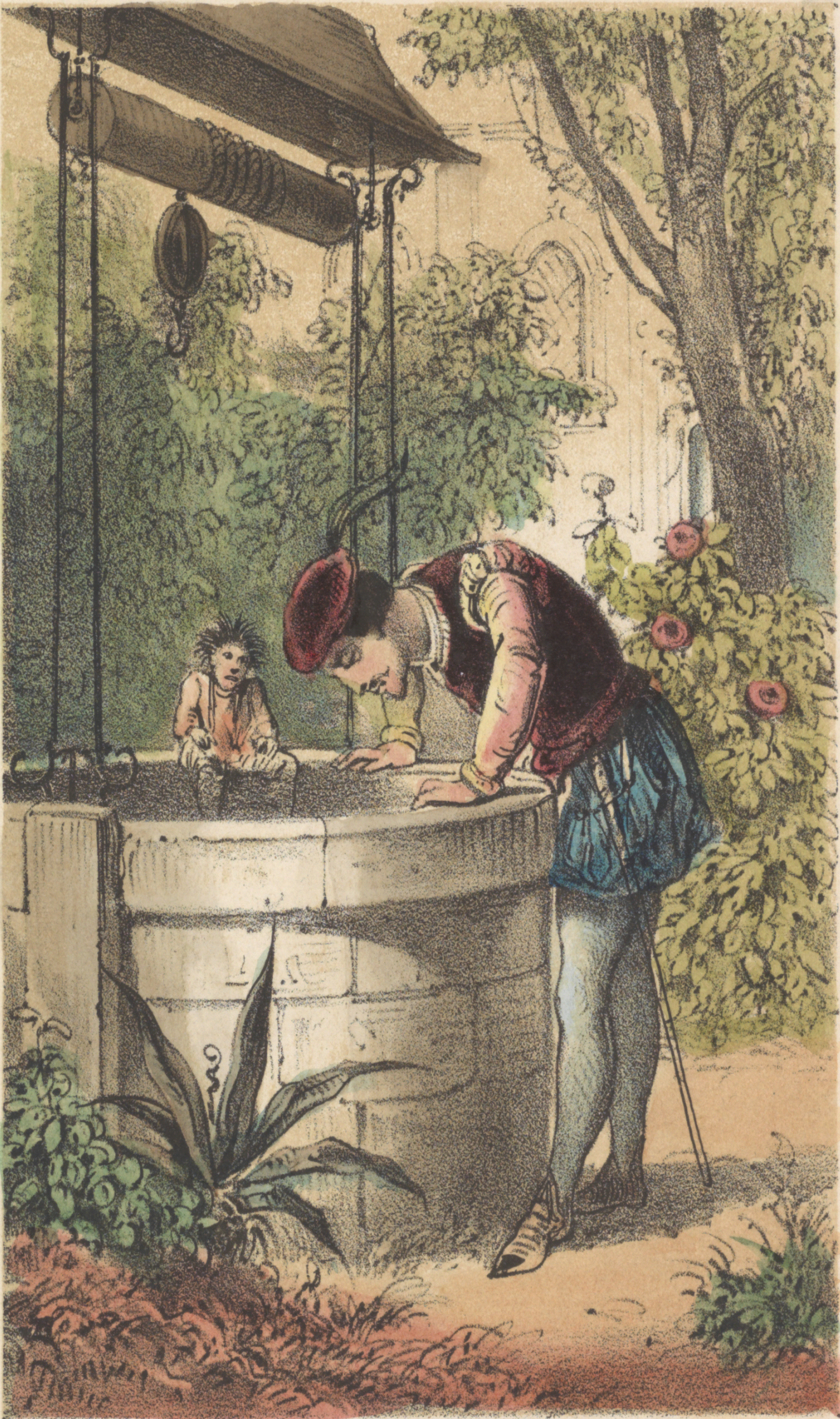
- The Gnome

Folk tale
- Name: The Gnome
- Aarne–Thompson grouping: ATU 301A
- Country: Germany
- Published in: Grimms' Fairy Tales

"The Gnome" is a German fairy tale collected by the Brothers Grimm in Grimm's Fairy Tales, tale number 91.

It is Aarne-Thompson type 301A, (Note: The third revision of the Aarne-Thompson classification system, made in 2004 by German folklorist Hans-Jörg Uther, subsumed both subtypes AaTh 301A and AaTh 301B into the new type ATU 301.) The Quest for the Vanished Princesses.

== Synopsis ==
A king owns a poison tree, and whoever eats a fruit from it will vanish underground. His three daughters want to see if that really happens. The youngest says that their father loves them too much for that, so they eat the fruit and sink underground. The king becomes so worried about his daughters vanished underground, that he offers their hand to whoever saves them.

Three huntsmen set out. They find a castle with no one in it but food set out, so they watch and then eat, and agree to draw lots; one will stay and make camp while the other two will search. The eldest stays until he is confronted by a small gnome who begs for bread. The eldest reluctantly gives him a piece, but the gnome asks him for the whole loaf. At first, the eldest is confused about why the Gnome wanted so much bread, but when he refuses, the gnome suddenly beats him up until he is unconscious so that he can take away the whole loaf to chow down on. The same thing happens to the second huntsman. Later, the third one finds his companions unconscious, and accuses the gnome for ambushing them during their quest. Blamed for his wrongdoing, the gnome is forced to apologize, promising to show him how to rescue the king's daughters. He shows him a deep well without water, warns that his companions might betray him and so he has to go alone, and vanishes. The third tells the other two, and they go to the well. The eldest and next both try to be lowered, but panic; the youngest goes down and finds the king's daughters being held captive, one by a dragon with nine heads, one by one with five, one by one with four. He kills the dragons and has the king's daughters lifted in the basket. Then he puts in a rock; his brothers cut the rope and take the princesses back to the king.

The youngest finds a flute. Playing it conjures up elves, who bring him to the surface. The princesses tell the truth, and the angered King sentences the older brothers to death by hanging, yet he allows the youngest son to marry the youngest princess anyway for being the only sibling in the offspring to do the right thing for his family.

== Motifs ==
The rescue of the princesses and the throwing down the cliff by his rivals appear also in The Story of Bensurdatu; in The Bold Knight, the Apples of Youth, and the Water of Life, the hero is also thrown down by the rival.
