= The Story of Bensurdatu =

Italian fairy tale

The Story of Bensurdatu is an Italian fairy tale collected by Laura Gonzenbach in her 1870 anthology Sicilianische Märchen ("Sicilian Fairy Tales"). It was later included by Andrew Lang in The Grey Fairy Book (1900). The tale follows a loyal servant named Bensurdatu who rescues three kidnapped princesses from giants and a seven-headed serpent, only to be betrayed by his companions before ultimately being vindicated. Folklorists classify it as ATU type 301, The Three Stolen Princesses.

== Synopsis ==
A king and queen had three daughters whom they indulged. One day, the princesses asked to go on a picnic. After they finished eating, the princesses wandered into the garden and stepped across a fence, where a dark cloud enveloped and abducted them. When the king and queen could not find them, the king proclaimed that whoever rescued the princesses could marry one and would become the next king. Two generals set out to find them but, after spending all their money, were forced to work as servants for an innkeeper to repay their debts.

A royal servant named Bensurdatu then set out, despite the king's reluctance to lose a faithful servant in addition to his daughters and generals. Bensurdatu found the inn where the generals were working and paid their debt. The three then traveled together. In the wilderness, they found a house and begged for shelter. The old woman inside told them that the princesses had been taken by a thick cloud, and that two were prisoners of giants and the third was held by a seven-headed serpent, all at the bottom of a river. The generals wanted to return home, but Bensurdatu insisted they press on.

They reached the river, and the generals insisted on being lowered first because of their seniority. They were lowered on a rope with a bell to signal when to be pulled up, but each quickly lost his courage and rang the bell. Finally, Bensurdatu was lowered. He found a hall where a giant was sleeping, with one of the princesses standing watch. She hid him and assured the giant he did not smell a man when he stirred. She then had Bensurdatu cut off the giant's head. The grateful princess gave him a golden crown and showed him the way to the next giant, whom he killed in the same manner. The second princess also gave him a golden crown. He then proceeded to the seven-headed serpent, which he had to fight while it was awake, but he succeeded in cutting off all its heads.

After rescuing the princesses, Bensurdatu had them lifted up first. The youngest princess wanted him to go before her, fearing the generals' treachery, but he refused. She pledged she would marry no one else. Once the princesses were safe, the generals refused to lower the rope for Bensurdatu and threatened the princesses into claiming that the generals had rescued them. Believing the lie, the king agreed to let the generals marry the two eldest princesses.

Trapped below, Bensurdatu found a magic purse. When he opened it, it asked him what he needed for his rescue. Bensurdatu requested to be brought to the surface and given a ship. He sailed to the king's city, where the king wanted to marry him to the youngest princess, but she refused. Bensurdatu asked if she would say the same if he were the real Bensurdatu. When she fell silent, he revealed his story. The king then exiled the generals, and Bensurdatu married the youngest princess.

== Analysis ==
Soon after developing his classification of folktales, Finnish folklorist Antti Aarne published a study in 1912 on several major collections, including those of the Brothers Grimm, Johann Georg von Hahn, Svend Grundtvig, Laura Gonzenbach, and Alexander Afanasyev. According to this primary system, developed in 1910, the tale fits type 301, "The Three Stolen Princesses". This typing was corroborated by professor Jack Zipes, who also classified the tale as AaTh 301, "Quest for a Vanished Princess".

According to Reinhold Köhler's annotations on the tale, the story belongs to a cycle in which a youth rescues three princesses from a subterranean realm, is betrayed by his companions, finds another exit, reveals the deceit, and marries one of the princesses.

== See also ==
- Aladdin
- Prâslea the Brave and the Golden Apples
- Soria Moria Castle
- The Bird 'Grip'
- The Bold Knight, the Apples of Youth, and the Water of Life
- The Brown Bear of the Green Glen
- The Golden Bird
- The Golden Mermaid
- The King Of Lochlin's Three Daughters
- The Rider Of Grianaig, And Iain The Soldier's Son
- The Tinder Box
