= Norka =

Norka may refer to:

- Norka, a German village in the Volga region of Russia, north of Neu-Norka, now called Nekrasovo
- Department of Non-Resident Keralites Affairs (NORKA), a government department of Kerala, India
- "The Norka", a Russian and Ukrainian fairy tale
- Norka Latamblet (born 1963), Cuban Olympic volleyball player
- Norka Rouskaya (1899–?), Swiss dancer

== See also ==
- Nork (disambiguation)
