= Three Princesses =

Three Princesses (Hungarian: Három Királyleány) is a Hungarian fairy tale collected by author György Gaal and published in 1859. It is classified in the Aarne-Thompson-Uther Index as tale type ATU 301, "The Three Stolen Princesses". This type refers to a set of stories where three heroes (or three brothers) approach a cave or hollow and send one of them down to rescue three captured princesses. According to Hungarian scholarship, in some of the Hungarian variants of the tale type, the three heroic brothers are born at different times of the day, with the one born in the morning the true hero of the tale.

== Summary ==
In this tale, a king has three daughters that he has never seen daylight. One day, the elder princess, now eighteen years old, approaches her father and asks to be allowed to stroll in the garden. Despite some reluctance, the king indulges her. However, as soon as the princess leaves the castle, a dragon comes out of the water and kidnaps her. Next, the middle princess, already eighteen, asks her father to be allowed the same whim. Again, the middle princess is taken by the dragon. Lastly, the youngest princess follows her elder sisters in their fate.

The king announces that whoever locate his daughters shall have half of the kingdom. An old woman who has three sons, Estve ("Night"), Éjfél ("Midnight") and Hajnal ("Dawn"), thinks to herself that her sons could know something, and welcomes first Estve, then Éjfél, and lastly Hajnal when each arrive to her house. The trio are surprised at each other's presence there, but their mother assures they are brothers, and asks them if they saw the princesses. The elder two saw nothing, but Dawn says he saw them and can even rescue them. Hajnal asks his mother to go to king and convince him to construct a large chain, which the youth intends to use to reach the princesses in their underground prison.

Hajnal and his brothers carry the chain to the forest, tie it into a tree, and try to descend the hole: Estve and Éjfél try to climb down, but soon come back, leaving their brother Hajnal the one to venture forth. He climbs down the chain and arrives at a palace of copper, where the first princess is being kept by the dragon. The princess is surprised at his presence there, and warns him about her dragon captor, who drinks some liquid and eats loaves of bread to become strong. Hajnal eats the same portions as the dragon and waits for him. The six-headed dragon appears to fight Hajnal, but he is defeated and all of his heads are cut off. The princess thanks Hajnal and says he can use a copper rod to turn the castle into a copper apple.

Hajnal soon arrives at a second palace, of silver, where another princess is being kept by another dragon which he also kills, and at last to a golden palace, where the last princess is being kept prisoner by a twelve-headed dragon. Hanjal eats the same food as before and kills each dragon, then converts the silver castle into a silver apple with a silver rod and the golden palace into a golden apple with a golden rod. He takes the princesses and the castles with him to the chain and fences them up. On the surface, Hajnal drops the three apples near the king's palace, restoring them to their original form, to the king's surprise. Hajnal and his brothers marry the princesses.

== Analysis ==
=== Tale type ===
Elisabeth Rona-Sklárek commented that the tale about a youth who rescues three maidens from the underground prison was sehr verbreitetes (German for 'very prevalent') in Hungary. 20th century Hungarian scholar, Ágnes Kovács found 145 variants of the tale type, divided into 6 redactions. Hungarian-American Linda Dégh locates 7 redactions of the tale type in Hungary: 5 she considers to be "distinctively Hungarian", 1 "ethnic Romanian" and another from the South Slavics.

One of the Hungarian redactions, classified as 301A II* by Kovács with the name Este, Éjfél, Hajnal (Hungarian for 'Evening, Midnight and Dawn'), or Abend, Mitternacht und Morgendämmerung (German for 'Evening and His Brothers'), concerns three heroic brothers born on the same day, at different times. Nine variants of this type were found in Hungarian sources (as of the 1960s), and Akos Dömötor's updated version of the catalogue (published in 1988) registers 11 in total. These tales were still classified in the international index as AaTh 301A and, after 2004, as tale type ATU 301. (Note: The third revision of the Aarne-Thompson classification system, made in 2004 by German folklorist Hans-Jörg Uther, subsumed both subtypes AaTh 301A and AaTh 301B into the new type ATU 301.)

According to Hungarian professor Ákos Dömötör, in the notes to the tale type in the Hungarian National Catalogue of Folktales (MNK), the motif of three brothers' birth at times of the day is dated to the early-19th century, and appears as a "regional" element in tales from the northern and northeastern part of the Hungarian-speaking areas. It also appears in Romania.

== Variants ==
=== Hungary ===
==== Night, Midnight and Dawn (Berze Nagy) ====
In the Hungarian tale Este, Éjfél mëg Hajnal, collected by folklorist Janos Berze Nagy and translated as Abend, Mitternacht und Morgendämmerung (German for 'Evening, Midnight and Daybreak'), a childless couple pray for a son. An old lady instructs the wife to eat however many beans she can find in her house. The woman finds three beans and eats them, giving birth to three boys: one at night, the second at midnight and the third at the break of dawn. The three brothers grow up very quickly and seek a job opportunity with the king, who sends them to rescue his three daughters. When the brothers camp out in the woods, a small creature defeats the two older brothers but is defeated by Daybreak. The usual story follows: Daybreak rescues the three princesses, is betrayed by his brothers, escapes to the upper world on the back of an eagle. At the end of the tale, he forgives his older brothers.

==== Dawn, Night and Midnight (Mailand) ====
In the tale Hajnal, Vacsora és Éjféle (Hungarian for 'Dawn, Night and Midnight'), collected by ethnographer Oszkár Mailand from Szováta, Székely, an old woman gives birth to three boys, each named after the time of the day they were born. When they are of age, the king orders the youths to rescue his three daughters, otherwise they may lose their heads. The three brothers traverse a silver forest and a diamond forest until they reach a hole in the ground. The two brothers, with the help of a gypsy boy, begin to descend but feel afraid and climb back. Hajnal descends the rope and reaches three castles: the first guarded by an iron gate and two lions; the second by a stone walls and a pair of bears, and the third made entirely of marble and guarded by two elephants. After he is abandoned by his brothers and a gypsy boy, Hajnal has further adventures in the underworld and gains a three-legged horse. With the horse, he manages to reach the surface and the king's city.

==== Little Dawn ====
In a variant collected by Arnold Ipolyi with the title Hajnalka (Hungarian for 'Little Dawn'), a woman with no sons prays to God to have one. One night, she awakes and heats up the oven. A son is born at night: Este, who just as he appears, asks for some clothing to leave. His mother laments his departure. She awakes again at midnight, lights up a fire and another youth is born: Éjfél. He also leaves home. Finally, she awakes at dawn, lights the fire and a boy is born: Hajnalka. Just as they leave, they return the next day. Some time later, Hajnalka goes to the city and asks his mother why the kingdom seems to be grieving. His mother says it is because three dragons captured the princesses. Hajnalka states he and his brothers shall rescue them and orders the king for a great chain to be built, so that he can use it to reach másvilág (Hungarian for 'The Other World'), the realm of the dragons, located in an upper realm. Hajnalka climbs up th chain, rescues the three princesses on castles that gyrate on bird's feet (the copper castle on duck's, the silver palace on goose's and the golden one on crane's). With a magical wand, the youth transforms the palaces into small apples, gets the dragon's tongues, and depart with the princesses. On their way down, a "winged man" named Kalekaftor appears, takes the princesses (and the credit for their release) and abandons Hajnalka to his fate. Still in másvilág, Hajnalka shields a nest of griffin chicks from "sulphur rain" and their grateful father takes him to the human world. Now on earth, Kalefaktor insists to be married to the youngest, who tries to delay the marriage by demanding the items she had in the golden castle in másvilág. Hajnalka produces the items the princess asked for and marries her. The tale continues on as his brothers conspire to cut his legs and abandon him in the forest. Arnold Ipolyi noted that the usual location of the princesses' captivity is an underworld realm, even in a mountain, but not the sky.

==== The Magic Story of Dawn ====
A versified variant of the tale was also published in the journal Erdélyi múzeum with the title Hajnal tündéres története (Hungarian for 'The Magic Story of Dawn'): in the time of King Darius, a middle-aged woman gives birth to three sons at different times of the day, one in the evening, the second later that same night, and the third by morning. The youngest is thus named by the time of the day he was born: Hajnal ('Dawn'). At the same time, King Pandion goes to war, leaving his three daughters at home. When he returns from war, the three princesses are nowhere to be found. The three brothers offer to rescue them, and Hajnal goes down a hole to the underground, pulled by his elder brothers. Hajnal finds the three princesses in a green forest, in a silver castle, and in a golden castle, kills the multiheaded dragons and brings them to the rope so they can be brought up. His brothers take the maidens out of the hole, but a lame fox jumps into the basket, takes on Hajnal's shape and pretends to be him, tricking both his brothers and the princesses. Believing Hajnal has been rescued, the group depart and leave the real hero stranded in the underworld. Trapped in the lower world, Hajnal finds a blind man and works for him as a shepherd for a year, kills a pack of wolves and finds a band of dancing fairies and their mistress, beautiful Tündér Ilona. Hajnal asks the fairies how he can reach the upper world, and they say he can climb a large tree. Hajnal also tricks the fairies into revealing how he can cure the old man's blindness, and they say that water from the tree roots can restore his sight. Hajnal restores the blind man's sight, then steals a magic whistle, a magic needle and a magic pair of scissors from a witch. The youth blows on the whistle to summon a táltos horse that brings him to the surface, after a long period down there. Back at the surface, he finds work as a tailor's apprentice, who furnishes the three rescued princesses extravagant dresses they requested. At the end of the tale, Hajnal goes to the king's court, reveals the lame fox's deception and marries the youngest princess, Idilko. According to its publisher, Pálffi Márton, the tale was provided by József Nagy Tordátfalvi, a Székely farmer. Pálffi also compared the story to tales collected by Mailand, Gaal, and Érdelyi.

==== Night, Midnight, Dawn (Baranya) ====
Author István Banó collected a tale from the Baranya region, which he titled Este, Éjfél, Hajnal (Hungarian for 'Night, Midnight, Dawn'). In this tale, a woman gives birth to a son in the evening, being named thus. The boy goes to the forest as soon as he is born. She later gives birth to a boy at midnight, who also goes to the forest, and finally to a boy at dawn. The brothers return home and their mother explains their relation to one another. Years later, the local king's daughters disappear, and the monarch begs the woman for her sons to find them. They walk to the forest and rest for a bit, then alternate preparing the food for the others, while the other two fetch firewood. A devil appears and beats down each of the elder brothers, stealing their food, until Dawn, in the third night, defeats him. Dawn and his brothers reach a hole and the elder two send him down the hole with a chain. Down there, Dawn meets the devil again, and finds the three princesses: one in the castle of gold, the second in the castle of diamond, and the third in the castle of rubies. Dawn fights the multiheaded dragons keeping the princesses captive, the maidens turn the castles into apples with magic wands, and they accompany the youth to the chain so they could all return to the upper world. The princesses are roped up, but Dawn is left in the underworld, and the brothers leave with a red knight. He meets a gray old man who advises him to wear a horse's skin around himself and trick a griffin into taking him to his nest. In the griffin's nest, Dawn kills a snake that menaces the nest, and the griffin, in gratitude, takes him back to the surface. Once he arrives on the upper world, he helps a lion by killing a dragon, and they join forces. Dawn arrives at the king's court, where the princesses recognize him as their true saviour, and Dawn releases the lion on his brothers and on the red knight, killing them.

==== Night Son, Midnight Son, Dawn Son ====
In a Hungarian tale collected from teller Albert András with the title Estefia, Éjfélfia, Hajnalfia (Hungarian for 'Night Son, Midnight Son, Dawn Son'), a poor pigkeeper named János takes his wife to another kingdom where he finds work as the king's gardenkeeper. The king orders the man to look after the three princesses when they go for a walk in the garden. However, the man loses sights of them and they are swept away by a sudden wind. The king learns of this and orders János to search for his daughters in three days, else he will lose his head. János is luckless. However, God grants him three sons: one that is born at night, the other at midnight, and the third at dawn. The midwife places the baby under the bed, but they vanish. Suddenly, a youth enters their house, says he is Night Son, the elder, and asks for some food. Soon, his brothers join them. János enters his house and is surprised by the three youths' presence. the trio explain they are his sons, and learn the king's daughters are missing, and the king has set a deadline. The three brothers ask his father to tell the king they will search for the girls within a year. The king agrees to their terms, and fashions a large iron chain per Dawn Son's request. Dawn Son and his brothers go to the Morning Star, throw the chain to the star to make a bridge, and Dawn Son traverses it alone to the glass mountain. During the journey, he finds people transformed into animals. Dawn Son asks for directions from the cursed people about the location of the Green King's daughter, and reaches the castle where the elder princess is being kept prisoner by the dragons. He fights the first dragon, who advises Dawn Son to use a silver wand and wave at the castle to reduce its size and hide it inside a silver egg. Dawn Son does as the dragon advises, kill the last head, and goes to rescue the other princesses, hiding their castles inside a golden egg with a golden wand and a diamond egg with a diamond wand. Dawn Son takes the princess and the castles with him and returns to the chain, seeing that the cursed people have been restored. Dawn Son takes the princess with him to his brothers, who, jealous of his success, cut off his legs with an iron bar and shove him down the mountain. Dawn Son survives and is rescued by a being named Windrunning Pál, who shelters him in his cave, and goes in between the Green King's castle and the cave with news. Windrunning Pál visits the youngest princess, Ilona, and tells her Dawn Son is alive, whole the elder princesses have married his brothers. On another occasion, Pál visits a female baker that makes ginger bread, and learns a large warrior comes and eats her produce. The next day, Dawn Son and Pál detain the man and cut off his legs to give to Dawn Son and his arms to give to Pál. Now restored, Dawn Son goes to Green King's court and reveals to the monarch his brothers' deception. Dawn Son also shows him the silver, golden, and diamond wands and eggs, proving his claims. Dawn Son chooses to forgive his elder brothers, and marries princess Ilona.

=== Romani people ===
In a Romani tale collected from a teller in Alföld with the title Éjfél, Este és Hajnal (Hungarian for 'Midnight, Evening and Dawn'), a king's three daughters are captured by a dragon, and the king, in his grief, forbids people from hunting outside the confines of the realm. Dawn, one of three brothers, disobeys the king's prohibition and shoots a bird, which causes him to be brought to the king's presence. In his defense, Dawn tells the king he knows where the princesses are, and can rescue them. Dawn sends for his brothers, Midnight and Evening, and they depart on their mission. Dawn meets a blacksmith and commissions a large iron mace, then he and his brothers rest for the night. A bearded dward invades the lads' house and steals their food for two night, but on the third night, Dawn beats up the dwarf and ties his beard in a tree, then calls for his brothers. They follow the dwarf's trail to the lower world, and send Dawn down a chain. In the underground, Dawn fights three multiheaded dragons and releases the princesses, then brings them to the iron chain to the upper world. Midnight and Evening rope the maidens up and toss the chain down, believing they have killed their brother. Meanwhile, Dawn is swallowed by an iron-nosed witch, who he convinces can become even beautiful if she accompanies him to the blacksmith of the lower world. The blacksmith pours some embers on the witch's mouth, and she dies. The smith then tells Dawn the way to reach the upper world: in a part of the underworld, a rain of lead pours down on a nest of griffin chicks; if he protects them, their mother will help him. It happens thus, and the griffin mother agrees to take Dawn to the upper world. After feeding the griffin, Dawn comes to the surface, goes to the king's court and learns his elder brothers took the credit for the princesses' release. The king is told of Midnight and Evening's betrayal, but Dawn decides to forgive them, and marries the third princess.

== Adaptations ==
Hungarian journalist Elek Benedek adapted the tale as a literary creation titled Hajnal ("Dawn"), published as part of his collection of fairy tales.

== See also ==
- Fehérlófia (Hungarian folk tale)
- Dawn, Midnight and Twilight
- The Norka
- Prâslea the Brave and the Golden Apples (Romanian fairy tale)
- The Gnome (German fairy tale)
- The Story of Bensurdatu (Italian fairy tale)
