= Verlioka =

Verlioka (Russian: «Верлиока») or Wyrlook (Ukrainian: «Вирлоок») is an East Slavic fairy tale collected by Alexander Afanasyev in Narodnye russkie skazki (1855–63). It is classified in the Aarne-Thompson-Uther Index as tale type ATU 210*, "Verlioka".

== Synopsis ==
Once there was an elderly couple who had two grandchildren, whom they loved. One day, the grandpa ordered his granddaughter to shoo away the sparrows to protect the crops. Verlioka finds her there and kills her. The grandpa wonders why his granddaughter hasn't come back and sends his youngest grandchild to find her. Verlioka kills her too. Grandpa then sends the grandmother to bring the girls back but Verlioka kills her. After a while, the grandfather goes out to find his family, learns they are dead, and sets out to kill the monster. Along the way, he is joined by talking animals and objects, who attack the monster in his home.

== Etymology ==
The Ukrainian language has an adjective "вирлоокий" ('vyrlookyi'), meaning "with bulging eyes"; noun "вирло", plural "вирла" ('bulging eyes'). The name has cognates with other Slavic languages: Belarusian: вірлавокi, romanized: virlavoki ('with bulging eyes'), Serbian: врљоока, romanized: vrljooka ('with a damaged eye'), dialectal Smolensk Russian: верлиокий, romanized: verliokiy, lit. 'strabismic, crossy-eyed'; 'turning their eyes in all directions'). This may reflect Proto-Slavic *vьrl- ('to turn, to spin') + *oko ('eye').

== Analysis ==
According to Alexander Afanasyev's note, the tale was collected by Nikolay Tikhorski in "Southern Russia". According to the East Slavic Folktale Classification (Russian: СУС, romanized: SUS), there are 3 Russian, 7 Ukrainian, and 1 Belarusian variant. Notemakers Lev Barag and N. V. Novikov theorize that the typical Ukrainian ending «Вот вам сказка, а мне бубликов вязка» (Ukrainian: Ось вам казка, а мені бубликів в'язка, "Here's a tale for you, and a bunch of donuts for me"; in Bain's translation "So there's a skazha for you－and I deserve a cake or two also."), as well as usage of the vocative case («А вы, добродею, знаете Верлиоку?») possibly suggest that the tale was written in or near Ukraine.

American professor Jack Haney suggested that the tale is "primarily" East Slavic, while German folklorist Hans-Jörg Uther argues that the tale type appears to be "mainly documented in Russia".

== Variants ==
Alexander Afanasyev's fairy tale collection has a variant.

Robert Nisbet Bain included a retelling of the story in Russian Fairy Tales, a translation of Nikolai Polevoy's work.

Russian folklorist D.K. Zelenin listed a variant as the ninety-sixth story in his collection.

Two Russian versions were collected from one informant in Belozerye.

“Довгомудыкъ," ("Dovgomudyik") is a Ukrainian variant.

Another Ukrainian variant appears as the twenty-sixth story in a collection.

A Belarusian variant was published by V.N. Dobrovolsky.
