= Dawn, Midnight and Twilight =

Russian fairy tale

Dawn, Twilight and Midnight

Folk tale
- Name: Dawn, Twilight and Midnight
- Aarne–Thompson grouping: ATU 301, "The Three Stolen Princesses"
- Region: Russia
- Published in: Russian Fairy Tales by Alexander Afanasyev (1865); Fairy Tales of Eastern Europe, by Jeremiah Curtin (1914)
- Related: ''The Three Kingdoms''; The Norka

Dawn, Twilight and Midnight or Dawn, Evening, and Midnight (Russian: Зорька, (Note: The word is related to the Pan-Slavic word Zorya, meaning both 'dawn' and 'dawn goddess'.) Вечорка и Полуночка, romanized: Zorka, Vechorka i Polunochka) is a Russian fairy tale collected by Russian folklorist Alexander Afanasyev and published in his compilation Russian Fairy Tales as number 140. The tale was translated by Jeremiah Curtin and published in Fairy Tales of Eastern Europe.

It is classified in the Aarne-Thompson-Uther Index as tale type ATU 301, "The Three Stolen Princesses". This type refers to a set of stories where three heroes (or three brothers) approach a cave or hollow and send one of them down to rescue three captured princesses.

== Summary ==
A king, Gosudar, builds an underground palace to house his daughters from any danger. Yet, they insist they leave the palace for a stroll in the garden, to see "the white world". When they do so, a strong whirlwind blows and takes them away.

The king, then, sends his men all over the kingdom, to find heroes brave enough to rescue the three princesses. An old widow's three sons decide to try their luck and heed the king's proclamation. They were called Midnight, Twilight and Dawn, named so after the time of the day when they were born.

The three siblings go their way and arrive in an abandoned hut in the forest at the edge of a desert. They soon alternate their tasks: while two hunt, the other stays at home to cook something. For three days, a man, small in stature, but strong in power, defeats the older brothers, Midnight and Twilight, but Dawn defeats the creature, who escapes to a crevasse on the mountain.

Dawn fashions a strong rope from the bark of trees and descends the hole, arriving at three palaces, of copper, silver and gold. Inside each palace, one of the kidnapped princesses and a many-headed serpent that guards her.

Dawn kills each of the evil serpents, rescues the princesses and lifts them through the rope to the upper world. Dawn, Midnight, and Twilight each marry one of the princesses that Dawn saved.

== Analysis ==
=== Tale type ===
The story belongs to a Märchen cycle of a youth that rescues three princesses from their captivity in a subterranean realm and is betrayed by his companions. He soon finds another exit to the surface, reveals his companions' deceit and marries one of the princesses - a narrative structure commented on by Reinhold Köhler, although in this version, the heroic brothers work together to rescue the princesses from the pit, which is unusual for the tale type.

Russian scholarship classifies the tale as type SUS 301A,B, "Три подземных царства" ("Three Underground Tsardoms"), of the East Slavic Folktale Classification (Russian: СУС, romanized: SUS). The East Slavic type corresponds, in the international Aarne-Thompson-Uther Index, to tale type ATU 301, "The Three Stolen Princesses".

==== Relation to other tale types ====
The tale is related to tale type AT 301B, Jean de l'Ours, wherein a strong man, born of a union between a bear and a human woman, meets two equally strong companions and departs to rescue three maidens, imprisoned in an underground realm.

It has also been suggested that tale types ATU 301 and Jean de l'Ours, ATU 650 ("Strong Hans"), ATU 302 ("Devil's Heart in the Egg") and ATU 554 ("The Grateful Animals") may have once comprised a single narrative, but, with time, the original story fragmented into different tale types.

=== Motifs ===
==== The birth of the heroes ====
Professor Jack V. Haney stated that the motif of triplets being born at different times of one single day occurs in East Slavic tradition. Similarly, Russian folklorist Lev Barag noted that his motif is "characteristic" of East Slavic folklore: the heroes are bogatyr-brothers born at different times of the day: in the evening (thus being called Vyachorka, Vechernik, or Vechornik), at night (thus being named Punoshnik, Polunoshnik, Upuvnichnik), and in the morning (which gives them the name Zaranka, Zorka, or Svitovik). In addition, Bashkir scholarship concurs that the motif of the heroes' birth at different times of the day happens in East Slavic tales, as well as among other peoples of the (then) Soviet Union.

==== The castles in the eggs or apples ====
A recurrent motif of the tale type is the transformation of the underworld castles of the princesses into a more portable form (usually eggs, apples or balls). Thus, the eggs serve as protective shells for the castles - one of many magical properties attached to eggs, as folklorist Venetia Newall observed. Russian philologist Vladimir Toporov noticed the occurrence of the "egg-kingdom" in Russian fairy tales and saw an approximation of the motif with the Estonian and Balto-Finnic cosmogonic myth about the "cosmic egg".

Jeremiah Curtin saw a parallel between the Russian tale and a similar motif in the Hungarian folktale Prince Mirko or Mirko, the King's Son, wherein Prince Mirko and a rescued princess shrink a diamond castle into a golden apple.

== Translations ==
Journalist and children's book author Arthur Ransome published an extended and more detailed version of the story, with the name The Three Men of Power - Evening, Midnight and Sunrise. He described Evening as "dusky, with brown eyes and hair" and riding a horse of a dusky brown color; Midnight as "dark, with eyes and hair as black as charcoal" and riding a black horse; and Sunrise with "hair golden as the sun, and eyes blue as morning sky", and riding a horse "as white as the clouds".

Professor Jack V. Haney translated the tale as "Dawn, Evening and Midnight". Another translation is Evening, Midnight and Dawn.

== Variants ==
=== Distribution ===
The tale type ATU 301 is, according to Jack Haney, "one of the most popular in the East Slavic tradition", as well as being "widely reported" across Europe.

=== East Slavic ===
==== Russia ====
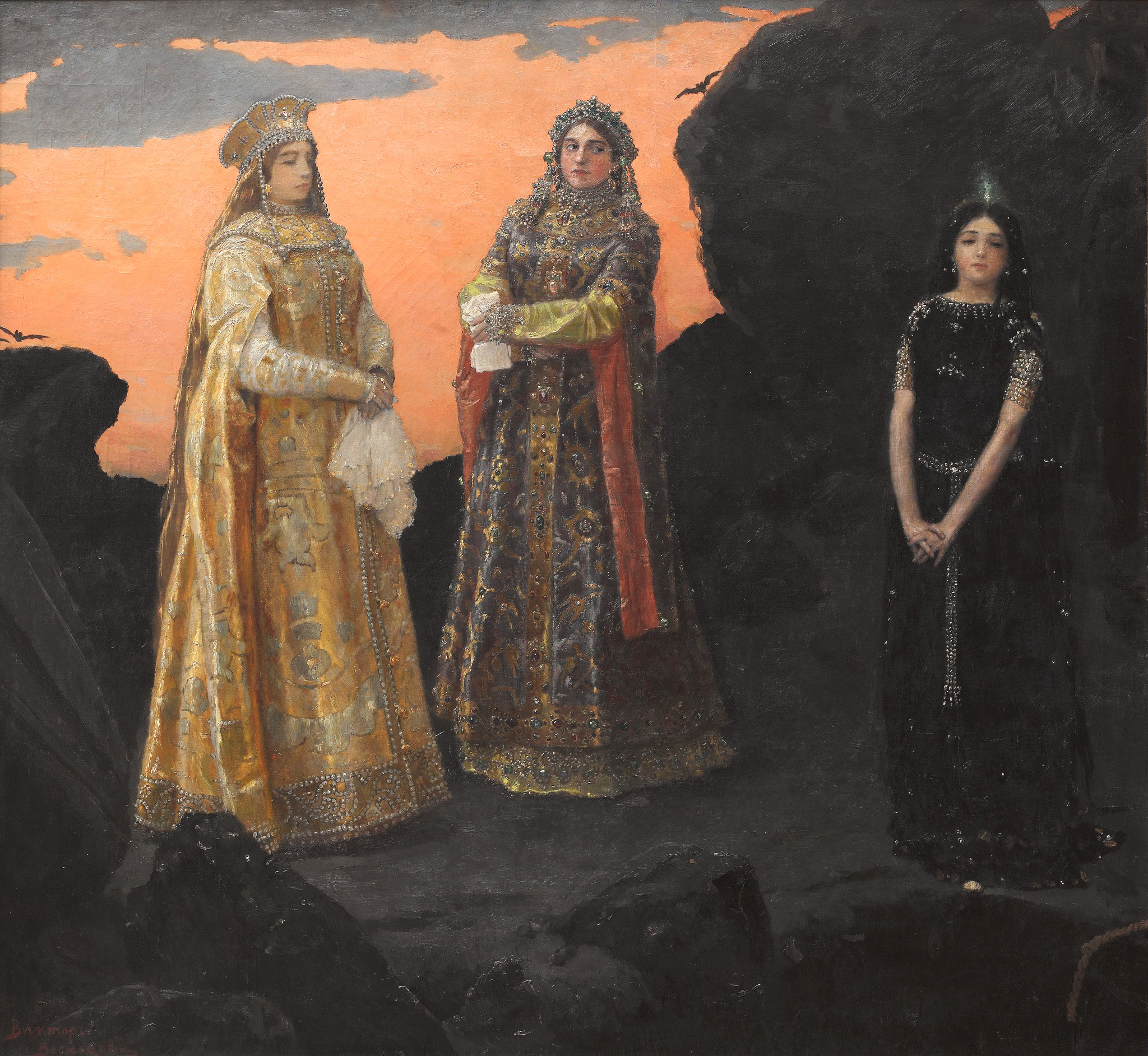
Three Princesses of the Underground Kingdom. Oil on canvas by Viktor Vasnetsov (1879). Based on the Russian fairy tale The Underground Kingdoms.

Russian variants of the tale fall under the banner The Realms of Copper, Silver and Gold. In fact, this tale type, also known as Three Kingdoms - Copper, Silver and Golden, is one of "the most popular Russian folktales".

Variants of the tale type are also attested with Selkup storytellers. These variants show the presence of character Koschei, the Deathless, the sorcerer of Slavic folklore, and are also classified as type ATU 302, "Devil's (Ogre's) Heart in the Egg" or ATU 313, "The Magic Flight".

===== Regional tales =====
A similar tale was collected in the White Sea region from Russian storyteller Matvei M. Korguev (1883–1943) with the title "Зорька-молодец" ("Zorka-Molodets"), which professor Jack V. Haney translated as Dawn Lad. In this tale, three brothers are born at different times of the day: Evening Lad at night ("Вечер-Молодéць", 'Vecher-Molodets'), Midnight Lad at midnight ("Полнóч-Молодéць", 'Polnóch-Molodets') and Dawn Lad at dawn ('Zorka-Molodets'). Equal in strength, they walk toward a mountain range to find out who lives there: they find three maidens (a merchant's daughter, a king's daughter and a tsarevna) captive under three many-headed serpents. Each brother kills one of the serpents. Later, Dawn Lad and his brothers liberate another princess from evil wizard Chernomor. When they descend the mountain range through an anchor, Dawn Lad's brothers take back the anchor and leave their sibling stranded. With the help of the fourth princess. Dawn Lad returns to the tsarevna and marries her, but the narrative does not mention a reckoning on his brothers' abandonment.

Russian folklorist Ivan Khudyakov collected a variant titled "Иван Вечерней Зори" ("Ivan Star-of-Evening"), wherein a merchant has three sons that grow up in hours: Иван Вечерней Зори ("Ivan Star-of-the-Evening"), Иван Полуночной Зори ("Ivan Star-of-Midnight") and Иван Утренней (Note: The word is related to Slavic *utro, meaning 'morning, dawn'.) Зори ("Ivan Star-of-the-Morning"). They live in a kingdom. In this realm, the king's three daughters have been captured by a six-headed serpent and their father requests any soul brave enough to rescue them. Ivan Star-of-Evening and his brothers offer themselves to the mission. They find a bogatyr named Bely on the journey and the four join forces to rescue the princesses. They soon reach a mountain and Ivan Star-of-Evening shoots an arrow with a rope to create a bridge to reach the mountains dangerous slopes. Ivan Star-of-Evening climbs the rope with his horse, arrives at three palaces (of copper, silver, and gold), kills three serpents (with six, nine and twelve heads) and takes the princesses to his companions. Bely betrays them and abandons Ivan-Star-of-the-Evening in the mountain. Fortunately, the hero finds a winged steed and returns to the realm to expose Bely's betrayal on his wedding day.

In the tale "О трех богатырях - Вечернике, Полуношнике и Световике" ("About three heroic bogatyrs - The-One-of-the-Evening, The-One-of-Midnight and The-One-of-the-Sunrise"), first collected in Siberia from storyteller Anton Ignatievich Koshkarov (Anton Chiroshnik) in 1925, Tsar Eruslan wishes to have a son. A hermit advises the king to find a golden fish and give to his wife. She becomes pregnant and gives birth to three boys: one in the evening, one at midnight and the last at sunrise. As soon as they are born, they leave home, but return three days later after a stay in the woods. After a series of adventures, the youngest brother, Svetovike ("The-One-of-Sunrise") rescues three princesses and marries the youngest.

In another Siberian tale, "Иван Вечерник, Иван Полуношник и Иван Зорькин" ("Ivan of Evening, Ivan of Midnight and Ivan of Dawn"), first collected in 1926 from raconteur I. Ivanov, the tsar's three daughters convince their father to go on a boat trip under the moonlight, but they are kidnapped. An old woman's three sons, the titular heroes, decide to rescue them. On their way, they meet a fourth companion, a devil-like being. They arrive at a mountain where the princesses are being kept and Ivan Zorikin casts a rope to climb the mountain.

In a third Siberian tale, "Вечерник, Заутренник и Светлан" ("Evening, Sunrise and Day"), first collected in 1926 from twelve-year-old Vasya Solovyov, an old woman loses her husband in the war. Some time later, she eats three fruits and gives birth to three boys: one at night, the second at sunrise and the third during the day. Svetlan, the youngest, finds a horse. The trio arrive at the edge of a hole and Svetlan climbs down a rope. He rescues the tsar's three daughters, but his brothers cut the rope and he gets left behind in the underground. Svetlan finds an old lady, who summons all her birds and the Firebird to help him reach the surface. When Svetlan arrives in the surface, he rides a horse to the wedding of his brothers and wants to kill them, but his mother begs for Svetlan to forgive his brothers. He does, but insists they should be thrown in prison.

Italian author Angelo de Gubernatis reported a Russian tale collected by Erlenwein. In this tale, titled "Светозор" ("Svetozor"), a woman gives birth to three sons, each at a different time of the day: Većernik, born at night; Polunoćnik, born at midnight, and Svetazór, born in the morning. After Svetazór is born, he commissions a heavy iron club from a blacksmith, and joins his brothers in rescuing the Tzar's three daughters, each held captive in a castle made of metal (the first of copper, the second of silver, and the third of gold). Down in the abyss, Svetazór gains from each of the princesses a metallic egg (from the first a copper egg, from the second a silver egg, and from the third a golden egg), then takes the princesses to his brothers to be roped out of the hole. Svetazór's elder brothers betray him, steal the princesses for themselves and abandon him down in the hole. Down there, Svetazór rescues another princess from the underground realm by killing a dragon and rescues a crow (that will serve as the hero's helper on the flight back to the surface world). At the end of the tale, Svetazór forgives his elder brothers, and marries the princess of the golden castle.

In an untitled Russian tale collected from a source in Northern Dvina, in a kingdom, a maiden who serves the king becomes pregnant, and the king orders her to be expelled. The soldiers banish her to the forest, and she finds a hut to pass the night. She soon gives birth to three boys: one born at dawn (thus she calls him Zornik), a second one she calls Nochnik, and the third Vechernik. The boys soon grow up in mere days, and decide to find food. They hunt some game (deer and hares) and cook it. Vechernik also notices a three-headed fiery serpent (zmei) flying overhead with a princess in its clutches. Vechernik watches as the zmei descends into a hole in the ground and whips. The next time, Zornik and Nochnik stay home, but do not see anything strange, save for Vechernik, who sights a six-headed fiery serpent on the second night with another princess, and a nine-headed fiery serpent with a third princess. The princesses are the local king's daughters, and the monarch sends his soldiers to rescue them. The soldiers pass by the maiden's hut in the woods with her three sons and report to the king. The king sends an emissary to recruit the three brothers for a rescue mission. The king asks the brothers if they know anything about the girls' disappearance, and Vechernik says he witnessed the fiery serpents carrying them off to a hole. Zornik and Nochnik are surprised by his brother's information, and the trio soon travel to the hole. The brothers find a shepherd on the road and take them along. Vechernik goes down the hole and finds an underground kingdom, with a doorless hut where the first princess is being kept. The tale then explains the queen also had her daughters on the same night: Zornitsa, Nochnitsa, and Vechernitsa. Zornitsa warns Vechernik about the fiery serpent who comes from the bridge. Vechernik kills the serpent, steals the zmei's horse, and moves to rescue the other princesses: Nochnitsa from a silver hut, and Vechernitsa from a golden house. In trying to defeat the last zmei over the final bridge, until he mutters a kalach can renew his strength. Suddenly, Vechernik remembers Vechernitsa gave him a kalach and kills his enemy, taking its horse with him. Vechernik takes the horses and the princesses back to the entrance of the hole and ropes the princesses up a large chain he used to descend. Back on the surface, Zornik, Nochnik and the shepherd help the princesses out of the hole, and the shepherd cuts off the chain to abandon Vechernik down there. Vechernik takes the horses and returns to the surface, where he discovers the elder princesses have married his brothers. Vechernik reunites with princess Vechernitsa, and they marry, while the shepherd is banished. Vechernik builds a copper house for Zornitsa, a silver one for Nochnitsa, and a golden one for Vechernitsa. Vechernik then takes his horses and travels the world.

==== Belarus ====
In a Belarusian variant, "Иван-утренник" or "Иван Утреник" ("Ivan Utrennik", or "Ivan of the Morning"), three sons are born to an elderly couple: Иван Вечерник ("Ivan Vechernik" or "Ivan-of-Evening"), born at night; Иван Полуночник ("Ivan Polunochik" or "Ivan-of-Midnight"), born at midnight, and Иван Утреник, born in the morning. Ivan-of-Evening is angry, Ivan-of-Midnight angry and Ivan-of-Morning the most heroic. They decide to rescue the tsar's three daughters. They go to the woods and find a place to spend the night. When they take turns to cook the food the other hunted, a little old man with a long grey beard appears and beats the hero to steal their food. When it is Ivan Utrennik's turn, he defeats the old man and sticks his grey beard to a trunk. Ivan Utrennik returns to his brothers to show them the captured thief, but he has escaped to a deep hole. The trio decides to follow after him and send Ivan Utrennik down the hole. He discovers the three captured princesses, each in a castle (one of copper, the other of silver and the third of gold). The princesses reveal their captor is "evil Kaschei". Ivan Utrennik decides to find "Kashei"'s death. On his way, he spares the lives of a kite, a wolf and a crayfish, who promise to help him. The three animals find the box with the villain's "death" (inside an egg). Ivan returns to the golden palace and sees the little grey-bearded man; he then smashes the egg on his forehead and kills him. Ivan Utrennik takes the princesses to his brothers to pull them up to the surface, but as soon as the maidens are saved, they cut the rope and abandon their youngest brother in the hole. He then wanders through the underworld until he finds an oak tree. He hears bird screeches coming from a nest on the treetop and protect the little birds from a hailstorm. Their father, a "Nagai bird", tells him he needs huge amounts of meat for the trip back to the surface. Ivan Utrennik reaches the surface, employs himself as a weaver and a shoemaker to provide marriage gifts for the youngest princess (the one from the palace of gold). When he is brought to the king's presence, the princess recognizes him and they marry.

In another variant from Belarus, "Вячорка, Паўношнік і Заравы" ("Vyachorka, Pavnoshnik and Zaravy"; "Evening, Midnight and Dawn"), an elderly couple has three sons at three times of the day, all named Ivan: Ivan Vyachorka ("Ivan Evening"), Ivan Pawnoshnik ("Ivan Midnight") and Ivan Zaravy ("Ivan Dawn"). They decide to rescue the tsar's three daughters. They find in the woods a hut on chicken legs and decide to spend the night. One night, a little bearded man comes to steal their food, but Ivan Zaravy beats him up. The little bearded man begs for mercy and offers to be their "little brother". Soon, the four arrive at a hole and Ivan Zaravy descends it by a rope. He finds the first princess in a palace of copper, with her three-headed serpentine captor. Ivan Zaravy defeats it, transforms the palace into an egg by the use of a handkerchief and takes the princess to his brothers. He rescues the princess in the silver palace, takes her to his brothers, and finally the princess in the golden palace. As soon as the last maiden arrives at the surface, Ivan Zaravy's allies cut the chain and strand him in the underworld. The youth walks until he finds a great oak with a bird nest. He protects the bird nest with his cloak and the birds' grateful father, the Firebird, promises to take him to the surface. He arrives at the surface when the youngest princess is set to be married to her false savior.

==== Ukraine ====
In a Ukrainian tale titled "Вечірник, Полуночник і Світанок" ("Evening, Midnight, and Sunrise"), a man and wife live together. One year, she gives birth to their first son in the evening, thus being called Evening; the next year, to a son they call Midnight, and the following year to a son named Sunrise. They wander the world and only return to their parents' house at the time of their namesakes: Evening returns in the evening, Midnight at midnight, and Sunrise at sunrise. One day, the tsar's daughter disappears, and no one knows where. The tsar's men consult with the three brothers, who also do not know. The trio also discover they are brothers and join forces to rescue the princess: they venture into a forest and reach a pit. Sunrise goes down the pit and finds a hut where a blind old couple live. Sunrise eats some of their food, and they notice his presence. The blind couple also tell him some evil rusalkas burnt their eyes with scalding water, and Sunrise goes to restore them: he forces the rusalkas to bring him some curative water, which he uses to heal the couple's sight. In gratitude, the old man gives Sunrise a magic sword, and the old woman advises him to take care when trying to return to the upper world, by tying a stone with the rope. Sunrise wanders a bit more and finds the princess in a cave. The princess says a seven-headed zmii captured her from the upper world when she was walking in her father's garden. The zmii appears and threatens Sunrise, who beheads six of its heads. The princess dowses the hero with a magic water and Sunrise kills the zmii, then takes the princess to the rope to the upper world. Sunrise's brothers lift up the princess, but abandon him in the lower world. Sunrise then finds an owl menacing a nest of eagle chicks and swings the sword to shoo it away. In gratitude, the father eagle agrees to take Sunrise to the upper world in exchange for being fed with water and meat. Sunrise reaches the upper world and appears in court to reveal the whole truth. Sunrise's elder brothers are banished for their treachery, and he marries the princess.

=== Finnic languages ===
==== Komi people ====
In a tale from the Komi people, "Рытко, Ойко да Асывко", collected by Komi Permian author Vasily Vasilyevich Klimov, an old woman hosts a traveller in her house, and he prepares her a drink with a potion. Some time later, she gives birth to three sons, each one born at a time of the day. The three brothers find the princesses in the underworld and rescue them, but Asyvko is left there by the false hero Керöспыкöта. Asyvko returns to the surface and provides the princesses with their underworld palaces.

==== Finland ====
In a Finnish tale translated to Hungarian as Alkonyat, Éjfél és Virradat and to German as Dämmerung, Mitternacht und Morgenrot ("Twilight, Midnight and Daybreak"), a king's servant has three sons, born at different times of the day: Twilight, born at sunset; Midnight, born in the middle of the night, and Daybreak, born at dawn. One day, the king's three daughter, who lived all their lives sheltered in the palace, want to stroll outside the castle. Each of them stroll in the garden and are taken by a whirlwind. The king offers his daughters as rewards for the brothers in case they save them. Twilight, Midnight and Daybreak go on their quest and find a companion on the road. They later reach the foot of a mountain and throw a long iron chain to climb it. Daybreak climbs the chain and finds three houses, one of iron, another of copper and a third of silver, each of princesses inside, guarded by a many-headed dragon. Daybreak defeats the dragons and releases the princesses, and later kills the mother of the dragons in her underground lair. Daybreak guides the princesses to the iron chain. After the girls climb down the chain, their companion cuts off the links and strands Daybreak up in the mountain. He meets a blind man whom he cures and, in gratitude, gives him the means to climb down the mountain. Daybreak returns to the king's palace in time for the third princess's marriage to the traitorous companion. Daybreak kills the companion and marries the youngest princess.

=== Romania ===
In Romanian variants, the three heroes are born in the same day, at different times, which gives them their names: Serilă, Mezilă and Zorilă (or variations). In these tales, the youngest brother is named Dawn and appears to be the most heroic of the three brothers.

==== Regional tales ====
In a tale collected by Romanian folklorist Dumitru Stăncescu with the title Zorilă Mireanu, a poor woman gives birth to three brothers at different times of the day: the first named "De cu seară", born at night; "Miez de noapte", at midnight; and "Zorila" at dawn. In the same kingdom, the king's three daughters are kidnapped by three dragons and taken to an underground lair. Zorila and his brothers offer to rescue them.

=== South Slavic ===
==== Serbia ====
Serbian scholarship recalls a Serbian mythical story about three brothers, named Ноћило, Поноћило и Зорило ("Noćilo, Ponoćilo and Zorilo"), collected by Serbian writer Atanasije Nikolić. In Nikolić's tale, titled "Ноћило, Поноћило и Зорило, три брата рођена" ("Night, Midnight and Dawn, Three Born Brothers"), an old couple wish to have children, so the woman prays to God to be able to have them. Thus, on a specific day, God grants her wish: the woman gives birth to a son at night, thus naming him Noćilo, a second son at midnight (Ponoćilo) and the last by dawn (Zorilo). The three brothers leave home as soon as they are born, and do not know their blood relationship. Meanwhile, a local king three daughters finds a tree with three golden apples, when suddenly three clouds appear and abscond with the princesses. The king tries to find anyone brave enough to rescue them, and reaches the brothers' mother's house. The three brothers meet each other and learn of their bond, and their mother begs them to find the lost princesses. Each brother has his own skill: Nocilo able to track anything, Ponocilo is aware of everything under the clouds, and Zorilo is the strongest there is. The trio stop at a ravine and try to go down the hole: the elder two suffer the perils of the descent, but Zorilo alone goes down the cave. Down there, he rescues three princesses and with a whip changes their palaces into apples. When Zorilo is ready to go up, his brothers abandon him in the cave, but he escapes with the help of a bird. Serbian scholar Pavle Sofric, in his book about Serbian folkmyths about trees, noted that the tree of the tale, an ash tree (Serbian: јасен), showed a great parallel to the Nordic tree as not to be coincidental.

==== Bulgaria ====
A similar tale of three brothers born at different times of the day is attested in Bulgaria with the title Bulgarian: Мрачил, Средвечер и Зорил, romanized: Mrachil, Sredvecher i Zoril (English: "Dark, Midnight and Dawn").

=== Georgia ===
In a Georgian tale, ივანე ცისკარი (Ivan Tsisk’ris, Ivan Tsiskari, "Ivan of the Dawn" or The Tale of John Dawn), the wife of a blacksmith is given an apple by her husband. Nine months later, she gives birth to three boys: one in the afternoon, another at midnight and the third at dawn. Because of this, the first is named Ivane Mts’ukhrisa, the second Ivane Šuaɣamisa and the third Ivane Tsiskari. Some time later, a local king witnesses his three daughters being kidnapped by a creature in a cloud (a devi) and taken from the kingdom. The three brothers decide to rescue the princesses and meet a companion on their way. They fashion a large chain to reach the mountains. Ivan Tsiskari enters three palaces (of copper, silver and gold), finds the maidens and three many-headed devis. He liberates the princesses, but is betrayed by the fourth companion and his brothers. The princess of the golden palace shouts at him to find a means of escape in the palace of the third devi.

=== Tatar people ===
In a tale from the Tatar people, published by folklorist Hamit Yarmi with the title "Тан-батыр" ("Dawn-Batyr"), the three daughters of a padishah are kidnapped by a sudden gust of wind. Near the edge of the village, an old couple have three sons, Kiç-Batyr ("Evening-Batyr"), born in the evening; Tön-Batyr ("Night-Batyr"), born at night, and Tan-Batyr, born in the morning. The trio decide to depart to rescue the three princesses. They start so a long journey their food they brought for the road is consumed. Tan-Batyr uses a needle his mother gave him in the fire and molds it into a fishing hook. He catches some fishes for himself and his brothers. Later, Tan-Batyr climbs a very tall tree to check their path, and a sudden gust of wind blows around them. Tan-Batyr supposes it is the same being that stole the three princesses. The wind materializes into a dev that Tan-Batyr fights and injures. The dev flees, leaving a trail of blood for the heroes to follow. They reach a cave entry blocked by a heavy stone. Tan-Batyr lifts the stone and descends the hole with a rope. With the help of a little mouse, the youth traverses through the thick darkness for seven days and seven nights, until he arrives at seven iron gates he crushes with his weapon. Behind them, three palaces, one of copper, the second of silver and the last of gold, each housing a captive princess inside. After rescuing the princesses, he becomes trapped in the lower world, but finds two animals, one black and one white, and jumps onto the black one, thus being led further into the underworld.

=== Bashkir people ===
Bashkir folklorist Nur T. Zaripov published a tale from the Bashkir people also titled "Тан-батыр" ("Dawn-Batyr"). In this tale, a khan has no children. He meets a sorceress that advises him to divorce his wife. The khansha, his now divorced wife, goes to the river bank and cries over her fate, until a fish comes to her and gives her three fishes, telling her to eat the bodies and leave their heads to the cook. The khansha follows the fish's advice and gives birth to three daughters. A female cook also eats the dish, but hides her pregnancy. The khan is pleased with his wife and his daughters, and keeps them in the palace at all times. When they are seventeen years old, the princesses asks their father to see the world and prepare to sail on a boat, whan a sudden whirlwind descends and takes the princesses. The khan falls into a state of grief and orders the palace's servants to be killed. The female cook runs away from the palace and finds a hut, where she gives birth to her three sons: one born in the morning (Таном, "Tan"), the second in the afternoon (Тюшем, "Tyush") and the third at night (Кисом, "Kis"). The three grow up and become fine hunters. The trio learns from a blacksmith about the princesses' disappearance and ask the man to forge sword for them, for they will search for them. On their long quest, they meet the witch ubyr-ebi, who rolls a barrel and orders the brothers to follow it wherever it stops. The heroes follow her orders and reach an entrance on the ground. Tanom, the eldest, orders his brothers to lower him down the well in a cauldron. Down there, he walks until he finds a copper palace; inside, the princess warns him against the three-headed deva that will come through the copper bridge. He kills the deva and goes to a silver palace, where he fights a six-headed deva on a silver bridge. Lastly, he arrives at a golden palace and defeats a nine-headed deva on a golden bridge. Suddenly, the old witch appears and gives Tanom a copper grain, a silver grain and a golden grain, each "holding one of the princesses", and advises him to go further, lift a rock and tame the black horse of the twelve-headed deva. Tanom takes the horse, goes back to the rope and fills the cauldron with the devas' treasure. Tanom's brothers betray him and cut off the rope, trapping him in the underworld. Still there, Tanom fights against the twelve-headed deva, swallows the grains and returns to the surface. He exposes his brothers' deceit and marries the khan's youngest daughter.

== See also ==
- Prâslea the Brave and the Golden Apples (Romanian fairy tale)
- The Gnome (German fairy tale)
- The Story of Bensurdatu (Italian fairy tale)
- Fehérlófia (Hungarian folk tale)
- Three Princesses (Hungarian fairy tale)
