= Tsarevitch Ivan, the Firebird and the Gray Wolf =

Russian fairy tale

Tsarevich Ivan, the Firebird and the Gray Wolf
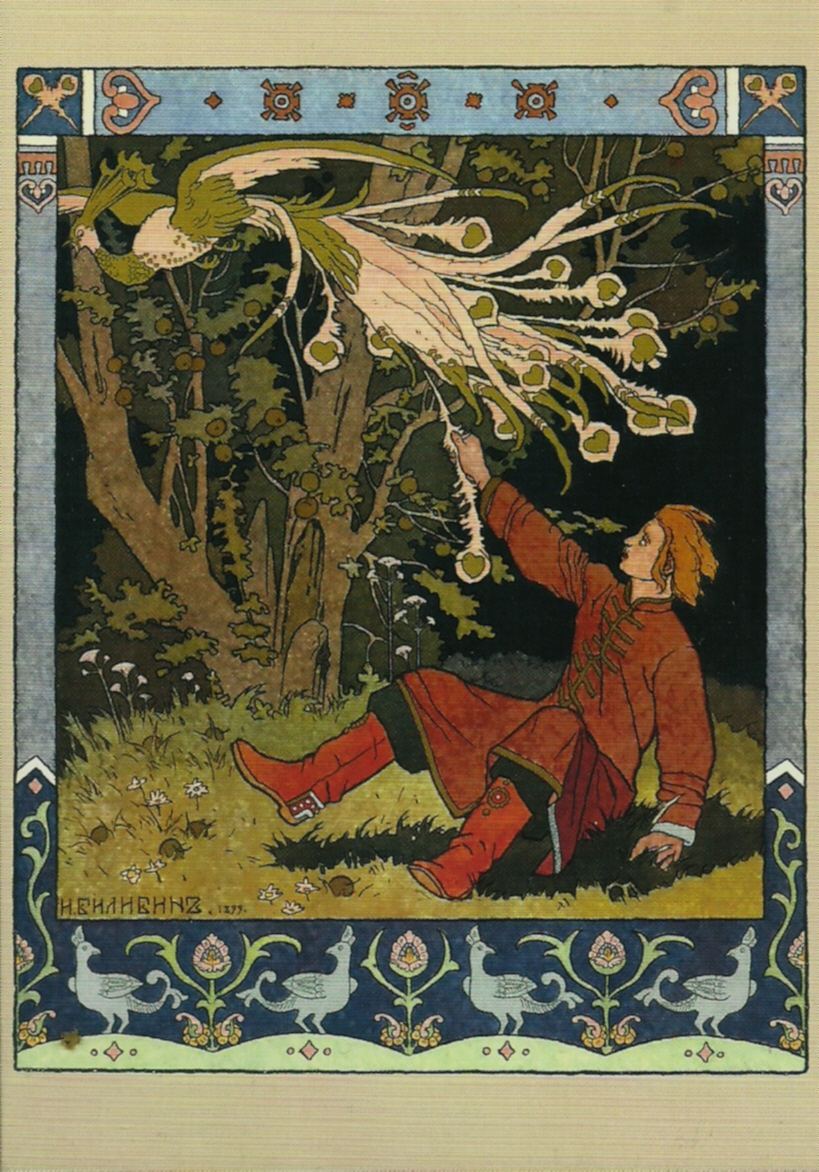
- Ivan Tsarevich Catching the Firebird's Feather. Illustration by Ivan Bilibin.

Folk tale
- Name: Tsarevich Ivan, the Firebird and the Gray Wolf
- Aarne–Thompson grouping: ATU 550 (Bird, Horse and Princess)
- Country: Russia
- Published in: Russian Fairy Tales by Alexandr Afanasyev
- Related: The Golden Bird

"Tsarevich Ivan, the Firebird and the Gray Wolf" (Russian: Сказка об Иване-царевиче, жар-птице и о сером волке) is a Russian fairy tale collected by Alexander Afanasyev in Russian Fairy Tales.

It is Aarne-Thompson type 550, the quest for the golden bird/firebird. Others of this type include "The Golden Bird", "The Greek Princess and the Young Gardener", "The Bird 'Grip'", "How Ian Direach got the Blue Falcon", and "The Nunda, Eater of People".

== Synopsis ==
A king's apple tree bore golden apples, but every night, one was stolen. Guards reported that the Firebird stole them. The king told his two oldest sons that the one who caught the bird would receive half his kingdom and be his heir. They drew lots to see who would be first, but both fell asleep; they tried to claim it had not come, but it had stolen an apple. Finally Ivan Tsarevich, the youngest son, asked to try; his father was reluctant because of his youth but consented. Ivan remained awake the entire time, and upon seeing the bird, tried to catch it by the tail. Unfortunately, Ivan only managed to grasp one feather. The Firebird did not return, but the king longed for the bird. He said that still, whoever caught it would have half his kingdom and be his heir.

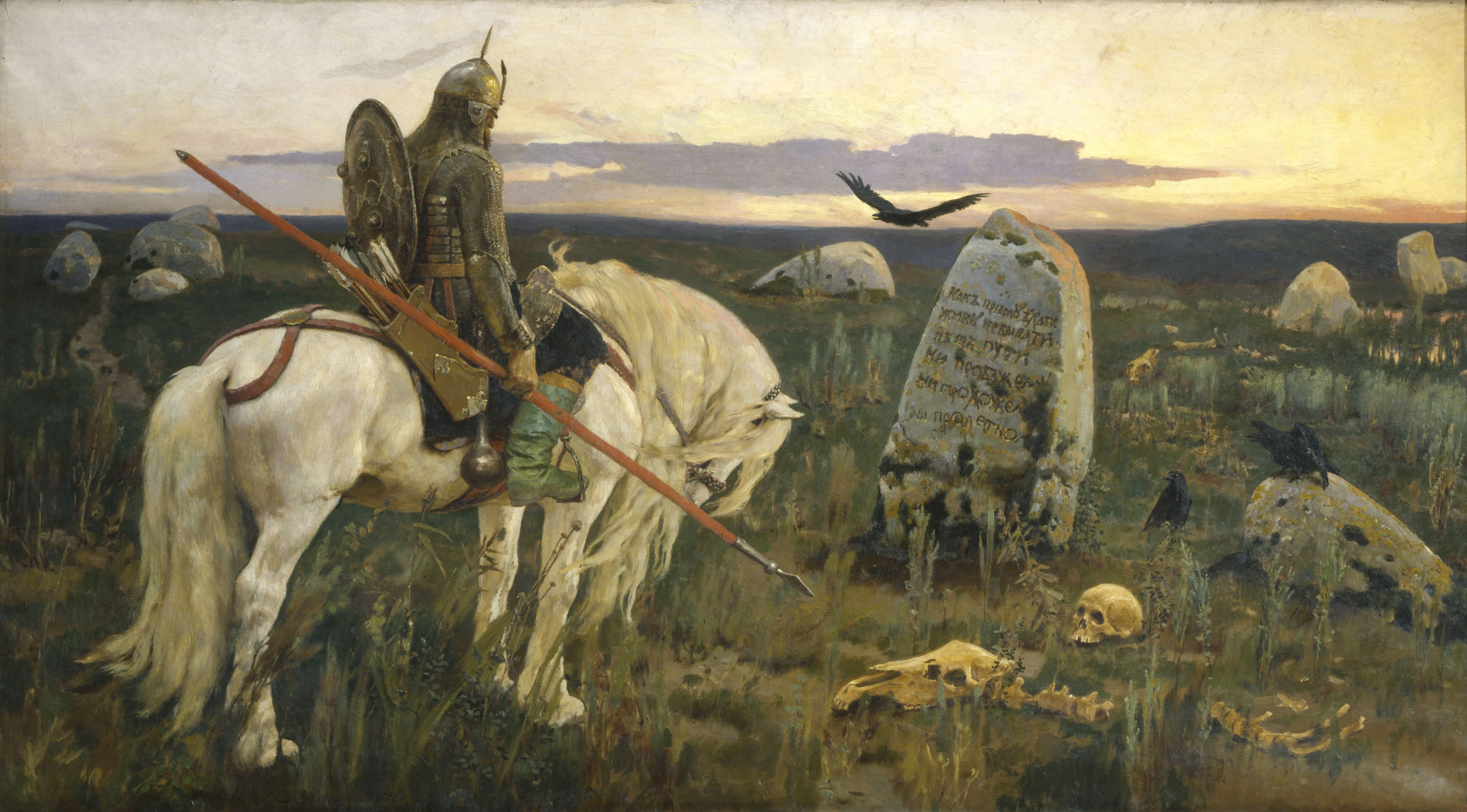
The Knight at the Crossroads by Viktor Vasnetsov

The older brothers set out. They came to a stone that said whoever took one road would know hunger and cold; whoever took the second would live, though his horse would die; and whoever took the third would die, though his horse would live. They did not know which way to take, and so took up an idle life.

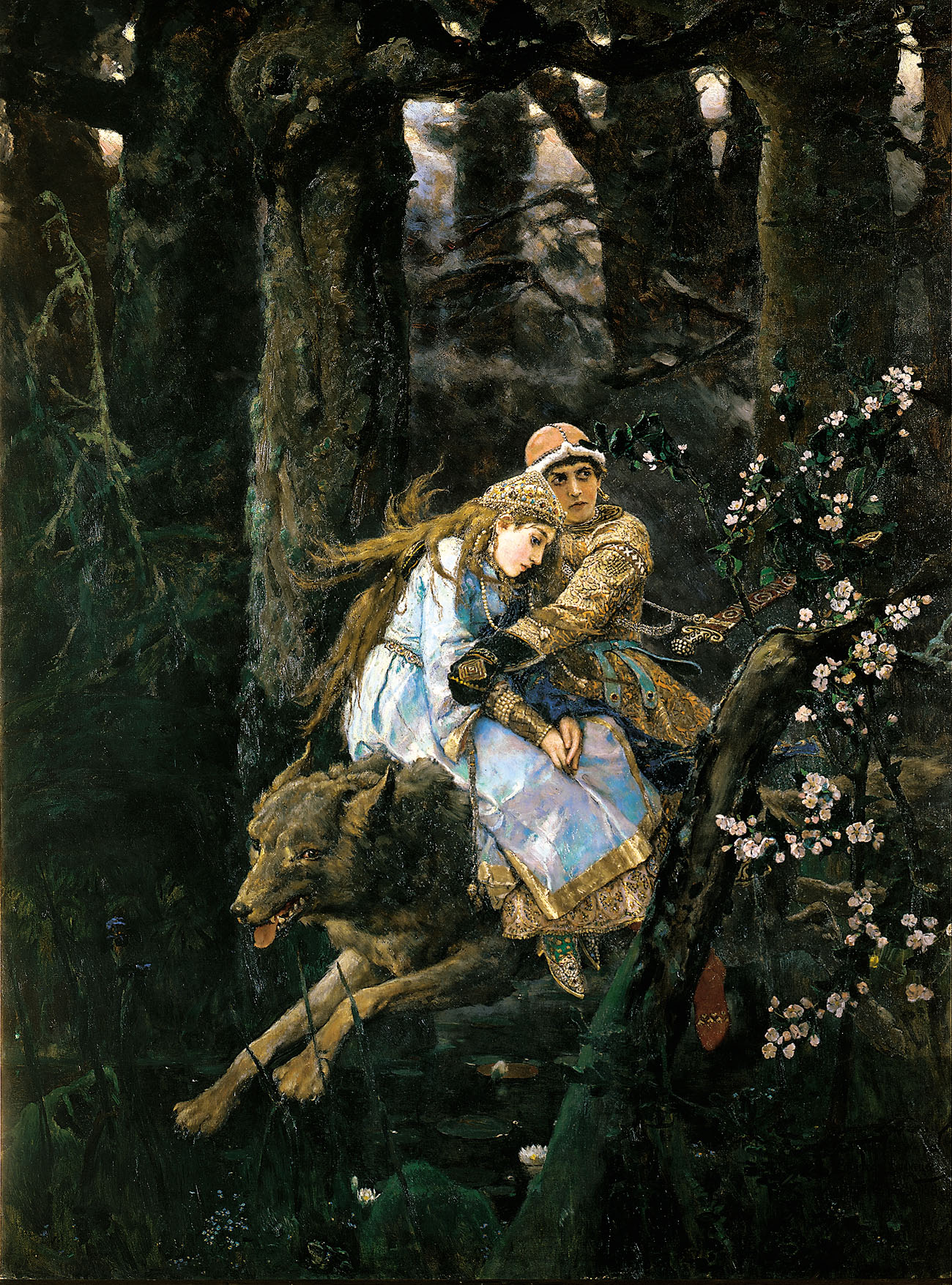
Ivan Tsarevich riding the Gray Wolf by Viktor Vasnetsov

Ivan begged to be allowed to go until his father yielded. He took the second road, and a wolf ate his horse. He walked until he was exhausted, and the wolf offered to carry him. It brought him to the garden where the firebird was and told him to take it out without touching its golden cage. The prince went in, but thought it was a great pity not to take the cage, but when he touched it, bells rang, waking everyone, and he was captured. He told his story, and the First King said he could have had it for the asking, but he could be spared now only if he could present the king with the Horse with the Golden Mane.

He met the wolf and admitted to his disobedience. It carried him to the kingdom and stables where he could get the horse and warned him against the golden bridle. Its beauty tempted him, and he touched it, and instruments of brass sounded. He was captured, and the Second King told him that if he had come with the word, he would have given him the horse, but now he would be spared only if he brought him Helen the Beautiful to be his wife.

Ivan went back to the wolf, confessed, and was brought to her castle. The wolf carried her off, but Ivan was able to assuage her fears. Ivan brought her back to the Second King, but wept because they had come to love each other. The wolf turned itself into the form of the princess and had Ivan exchange it for the Horse with the Golden Mane. Ivan and Helen rode off on the Horse. The wolf escaped the king. It reached Ivan and Helen, and Helen rode the horse and Ivan the wolf. Ivan asked the wolf to become like the horse and let him exchange it for the Firebird, so that he could keep the horse as well. The wolf agreed, the exchange was done, and Ivan returned to his own kingdom with Helen, the horse, and the Firebird.

The wolf said its service was done when they returned to where it had eaten Ivan's horse. Ivan dismounted and lamented their parting. They went on for a time and slept. His older brothers found them, killed Ivan, sliced his body to pieces, and told Helen that they would kill her if she would not say that they had fairly won the horse, the firebird, and her. They brought them to their father, and the second son received half the kingdom, and the oldest was to marry Helen.

The Grey Wolf found Ivan's body and caught two fledgling crows that would have eaten it. Their mother pleaded for them, and the wolf sent her to fetch the water of death, which restored the body, and the water of life, which revived him. The wolf carried him to the wedding in time to stop it; the older brothers were made servants or killed by the wolf, but Ivan married Helen and lived happily with her.

== Translations ==
The name of the Slavic Firebird is commonly kept as such in English translations. However, the bird can also be known by the name Ohnivak, Zhar Bird or Bird Zhar; Glowing Bird, The Bird of Light, or Fiery Bird.

This tale in particular was translated into English with the name The Tale of Iván Tsarévich, the Bird of Light, and the Grey Wolf. In author Edith Hodgetts's translation, titled The Grey Wolf and the Golden Cassowary, the bird is identified as a cassowary. In author Lilian Gask's translation, the shining bird is named Magic Bird. Charles Fillingham Coxwell translated the tale as Prince John, the Fiery Bird and the Grey Wolf.

== Analysis ==
=== Tale type ===
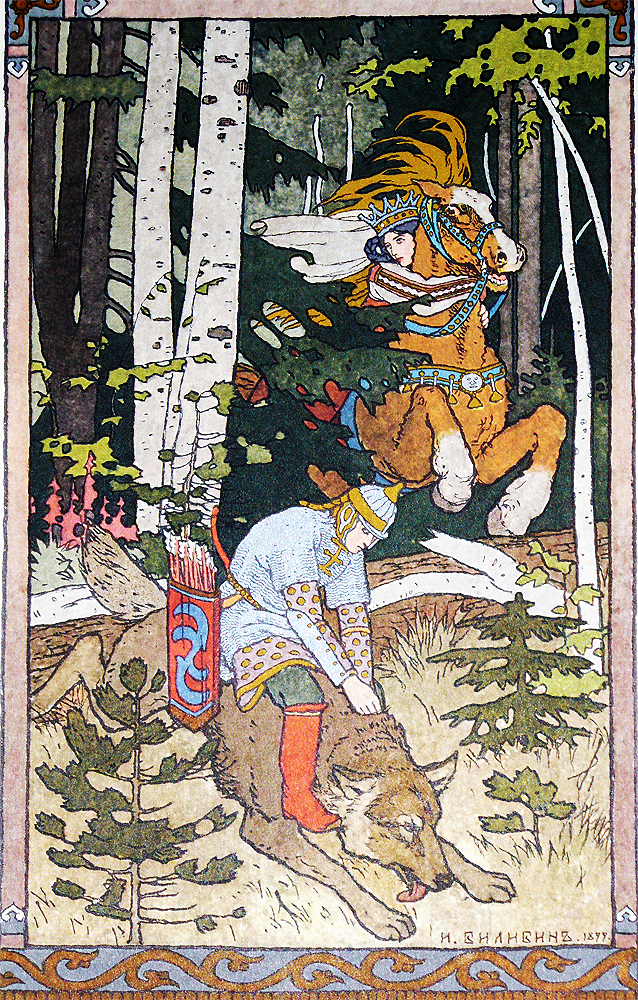
On the Gray Wolf, Tsarevitch Ivan guides the beautiful princess and the golden-maned horse. Illustration by Ivan Bilibin.

The tale is classified - and gives its name - to the East Slavic type SUS 550, Russian: "Царевич и серый волк", romanized: Tsarevitch i seryy volk, lit. 'Prince and the Gray Wolf', of the East Slavic Folktale Classification (Russian: СУС, romanized: SUS): hero seeks the firebird, a horse and a princess with the aid of a gray wolf; jealous elder brothers kill him, but he is revived by the gray wolf.

Folklorist Jeremiah Curtin noted that the Russian, Slavic and German variants are many. On the other hand, scholar Andreas Johns noted that the tale type ATU 550 was diffused through East Slavic tradition by printed lubok. The first appearance of the tale in Slavdom was in 1786, although Johns admits that the tale type "may have some roots in East Slavic tradition".

=== Motifs ===
Charles Fillingham Coxwell suggested that the helpful gray wolf may have originated from an Eastern source. He also noted that the motif of resurrecting the hero with water of death and water of life was "a Russian characteristic".

=== Variants ===
==== Russia ====
In a Russian variant, Ivan Tsarevich, the Gray Wolf and Elena the Most Beautiful, the prince must take part in a chain of deals: in order to obtain the golden bird, he first must capture the golden-maned horse from another kingdom; but, if he intends to obtain the horse, he must first kidnap foreign Princess Elena and deliver her to the tsar who owns the horse. A second Russian variant with a similar name was collected, titled Ivan Tsarevich and the Gray Wolf.

Austrian writer and journalist Johann Nepomuk Vogl published in 1841 a variant titled Das Märchen vom Vogel Schar, dem Pferd mit der goldenen Mähne und vom grauen Wolf ("The Tale of the Bird Schar, the Golden-Maned Horse and the Gray Wolf"): a Tsar named Wislaw Undronovitch has three sons, Dmitri, Vasili and Ivan Tsarevich. The tsar orders his sons to guard their garden from a nocturnal thief, but only Ivan discovers the culprit: a brilliant golden bird. After this revelation, the tsar sends his sons on a quest for the bird. this tale has also been translated into Croatian with the title Carević Ivan, Žarka ptica i mrki vuk ("Prince Ivan, The Firebird and the Dark Wolf"), keeping the names of the characters: Vislav Andronovič, Dmitrij, Vasilij and Ivan.

Russian author Ivan Khudyakov collected a variant titled "Жаръ-птица".

==== Georgia ====
Similar variants exist in the Georgian Folktale Index, with the same numbering, ATU 550. In the Georgian type, titled The Prince and the Wolf, the hero is sent for a wonderful bird and a maiden, and is helped by a wolf.

==== Ukraine ====
In a Ukrainian tale collected by folklorist Petro Lintur from Khust with the title "Железный волк" (Ukrainian: "Залізний вовк"; English: "The Iron Wolf"), the king's prized pear tree is being attacked by some thief that steals the golden pears, and the three princes are put on guard duty; the elder two fall asleep and fail, while the youngest, Mishko, stays awake and discovers the culprit: a golden bird. With the help of the titular Iron Wolf, Mishko begins a quest for the golden bird (that belongs to Tsar Poganin), a golden-maned horse and a golden-haired princess.

==== Latvia ====
According to the Latvian Folktale Catalogue, tale type 550, "Bird, Horse, and Princess", is known in Latvia as Zelta putns ("Golden Bird"), comprising two different redactions. In its first redaction, the hero (the third prince) fetches the feather from the golden bird; a wolf devours his horse to regain its strength and promises to help the prince in a chain of quests for the golden bird, a golden colt and a princess.

== Adaptations ==
Russian Romantic writer Vasily Zhukovsky adapted the tale into verse form in his poem "Сказка о Иване-царевиче и Сером Волке" ("The Tale of Ivan Tsarevich and the Grey Wolf").

English author Alan Garner adapted the tale as Grey Wolf, Prince Jack and the Firebird: the hero is renamed Prince Jack, who lives in the Stone Castle; the firebird lives in the Copper Kingdom, and the horse of the Golden Mane is found in the Iron Castle.

The WEBTOON comic, The Red King, by Heylenne is loosely based on this tale.

== See also ==
- Laughing Eye and Weeping Eye
- The Nine Peahens and the Golden Apples
- Prâslea the Brave and the Golden Apples
- The Firebird and Princess Vasilisa
- The Bold Knight, the Apples of Youth, and the Water of Life
- The Death of Koschei the Deathless
- The Humpbacked Horse
