= Russian fairy tale =

Fairy tale from Russia

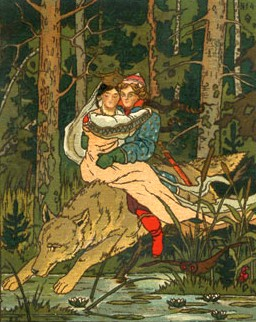
Ivan Tsarevich and the Grey Wolf (Zvorykin)

A Russian fairy tale or folktale (Russian: ска́зка, romanised: skazka; plural ска́зки, skazki) is a fairy tale in Russian culture.

Various sub-genres of skazka exist. A volshebnaya skazka (Russian: волше́бная ска́зка, lit. 'magical tale') is considered a magical tale, skazki o zhivotnykh are tales about animals, and bytovye skazki are tales about household life.

Russian folklore was first collected by scholars and systematically studied in the 19th century. Russian fairy tales and folk tales were catalogued (compiled, grouped, numbered and published) by Alexander Afanasyev in his 1850s Narodnye russkie skazki. Scholars of folklore still refer to his collected texts when citing the number of a skazka plot. An exhaustive analysis of the stories, describing the stages of their plots and the classification of the characters based on their functions, was developed later, in the first half of the 20th century, by Vladimir Propp (1895-1970).

== History ==
Appearing in the latter half of the eighteenth century, fairy tales became widely popular as they spread throughout the country. Literature was considered an important factor in the education of Russian children who were meant to grow from the moral lessons in the tales. During the 18th Century Romanticism period, poets such as Alexander Pushkin and Pyotr Yershov began to define the Russian folk spirit with their stories. Throughout the 1860s, despite the rise of Realism, fairy tales still remained a beloved source of literature which drew inspiration from writers such as Hans Christian Andersen.

=== Effects of communism ===
The messages in the fairy tales began to take a different shape once Joseph Stalin rose to power under the Communist movement. Fairy tales were thought to have a strong influence over children which is why Joseph Stalin decided to place restrictions upon the literature distributed under his rule. The tales created in the mid 1900s were used to impose Socialist beliefs and values as seen in numerous popular stories. In comparison to stories from past centuries, fairy tales in the USSR had taken a more modern spin as seen in tales such as in Anatoliy Mityaev's Grishka and the Astronaut. Grishka and the Astronaut, examines modern Russian's passion to travel through space as seen in reality with the Space Race between Russia and the United States. The new tales included a focus on innovations and inventions that could help characters in place of magic which was often used as a device in past stories.

== Influences ==
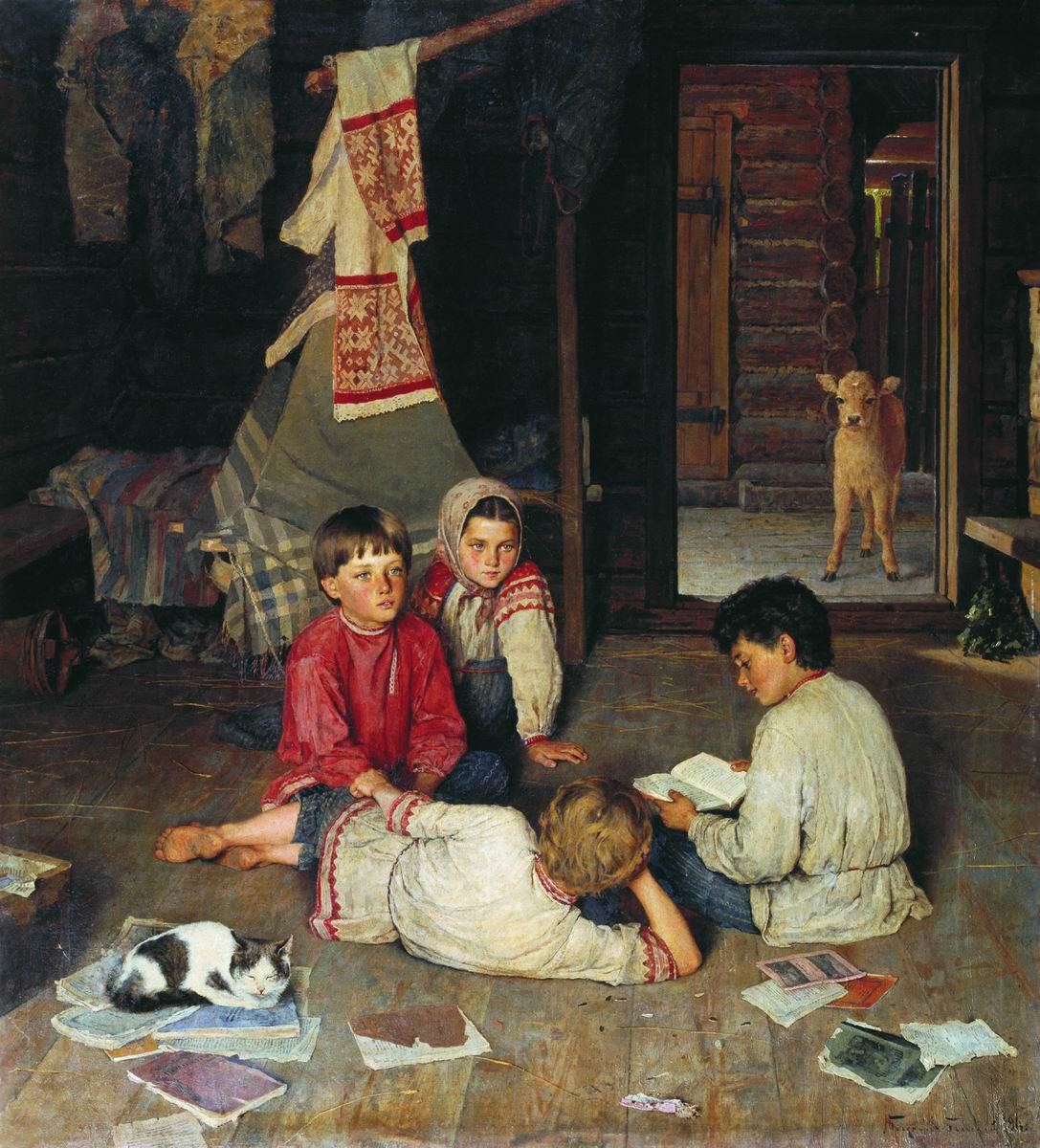
Russian kids listening to a new fairy tale

In Russia, the fairy tale is one sub-genre of folklore and is usually told in the form of a short story. They are used to express different aspects of the Russian culture. In Russia, fairy tales were propagated almost exclusively orally, until the 17th century, as written literature was reserved for religious purposes. In their oral form, fairy tales allowed the freedom to explore the different methods of narration. The separation from written forms led Russians to develop techniques that were effective at creating dramatic and interesting stories. Such techniques have developed into consistent elements now found in popular literary works; They distinguish the genre of Russian fairy tales. Fairy tales were not confined to a particular socio-economic class and appealed to mass audiences, which resulted in them becoming a trademark of Russian culture.

Cultural influences on Russian fairy tales have been unique and based on imagination. Isaac Bashevis Singer, a Polish-American author and Nobel Prize winner, claims that, “You don't ask questions about a tale, and this is true for the folktales of all nations. They were not told as fact or history but as a means to entertain the listener, whether he was a child or an adult. Some contain a moral, others seem amoral or even antimoral, Some constitute fables on man's follies and mistakes, others appear pointless." They were created to entertain the reader.

Russian fairy tales are extremely popular and are still used to inspire artistic works today. The Sleeping Beauty is still played in New York at the US Ballet Theatre and has roots to original Russian fairy tales from 1890. Mr. Ratmansky’s, the artist-in-residence for the play, gained inspiration for the play's choreography from its Russian background.

=== Formalism ===
From the 1910s through the 1930s, a wave of literary criticism emerged in Russia, called Russian formalism by critics of the new school of thought.

== Analysis ==
Many different approaches of analysing the morphology of the fairy tale have appeared in scholarly works. Differences in analyses can arise between synchronic and diachronic approaches. Other differences can come from the relationship between story elements. After elements are identified, a structuralist can propose relationships between those elements. A paradigmatic relationship between elements is associative in nature whereas a syntagmatic relationship refers to the order and position of the elements relative to the other elements.

=== Motif ===
Before the period of Russian formalism, beginning in 1910, Alexander Veselovsky called the motif the "simplest narrative unit." Veselovsky proposed that the different plots of a folktale arise from the unique combinations of motifs.

Motif analysis was also part of Stith Thompson's approach to folkloristics. Thompson's research into the motifs of folklore culminated in the publication of the Motif-Index of Folk-Literature.

=== Structural ===
In 1919, Viktor Shklovsky published his essay titled The Relationship Between Devices of Plot Construction and General Devices of Style. As a major proponent during Russian formalism, Shklovsky was one of the first scholars to criticise the failing methods of literary analysis and report on a syntagmatic approach to folktales. In his essay he claims, "It is my purpose to stress not so much the similarity of motifs, which I consider of little significance, as the similarity in the plot schemata."

Syntagmatic analysis, championed by Vladimir Propp, is the approach in which the elements of the fairy tale are analysed in the order that they appear in the story. Wanting to overcome what he thought was arbitrary and subjective analysis of folklore by motif, Propp published his book Morphology of the Folktale in 1928. The book specifically states that Propp finds a dilemma in Veselovsky's definition of a motif; it fails because it can be broken down into smaller units, contradicting its definition. In response, Propp pioneered a specific breakdown that can be applied to most Aarne-Thompson type tales classified with numbers 300-749. This methodology gives rise to Propp's 31 functions, or actions, of the fairy tale. Propp proposes that the functions are the fundamental units of the story and that there are exactly 31 distinct functions. He observed in his analysis of 100 Russian fairy tales that tales almost always adhere to the order of the functions. The traits of the characters, or dramatis personæ, involved in the actions are second to the action actually being carried out. This also follows his finding that while some functions may be missing between different stories, the order is kept the same for all the Russian fairy tales he analysed.

Alexander Nikiforov, like Shklovsky and Propp, was a folklorist in 1920s Soviet Russia. His early work also identified the benefits of a syntagmatic analysis of fairy tale elements. In his 1926 paper titled "The Morphological Study of Folklore", Nikiforov states that "Only the functions of the character, which constitute his dramatic role in the folk tale, are invariable." Since Nikiforov's essay was written almost 2 years before Propp's publication of Morphology of the Folktale, scholars have speculated that the idea of the function, widely attributed to Propp, could have first been recognised by Nikiforov. One source claims that Nikiforov's work was "not developed into a systematic analysis of syntagmatics" and failed to "keep apart structural principles and atomistic concepts". Nikiforov's work on folklore morphology was never pursued beyond his paper.

== Notable writers and collectors ==
=== Alexander Afanasyev ===
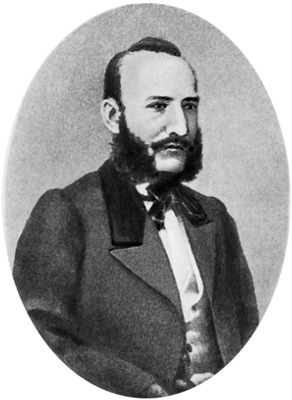
Alexander Afanasyev

Alexander Afanasyev began collecting fairy tales at a time when folklore was viewed as simple entertainment. His interest in folklore stemmed from his interest in ancient Slavic mythology. During the 1850s, Afanasyev began to record part of his collection from tales dating to Boguchar, his birthplace. More of his collection came from the work of Vladimir Dal and the Russian Geographical Society who collected tales from all around the Russian Empire. Afanasyev was a part of the few who attempted to create a written collection of Russian folklore. This lack in collections of folklore was due to the control that the Church Slavonic had on printed literature in Russia, which allowed for only religious texts to be spread. To this, Afanasyev replied, “There is a million times more morality, truth and human love in my folk legends than in the sanctimonious sermons delivered by Your Holiness!”

Between 1855 and 1863, Afanasyev edited Russian Fairy Tales (Russian: Narodnye russkie skazki), which had been modelled after Grimms' Fairy Tales. This publication had a vast cultural impact over Russian scholars by establishing a desire for folklore studies in Russia. The rediscovery of Russian folklore through written text led to a generation of great Russian authors to come forth. Some of these authors include Leo Tolstoy and Fyodor Dostoevsky. Folktales were quickly produced in written text and adapted. Since the production of this collection, Russian tales remain understood and recognised all over Russia.

=== Alexander Pushkin ===
Alexander Pushkin is known as one of Russia’s leading writers and poets. He is known for popularising fairy tales in Russia and changed Russian literature by writing stories no one before him could. Pushkin is considered Russia’s Shakespeare.

Pushkin gained his love for Russian fairy tales from his childhood nurse, Ariana Rodionovna, who told him stories from her village when he was young. His stories served importance to Russians past his death in 1837, especially during times political turmoil during the start of the 20th century, in which, “Pushkin’s verses gave children the Russian language in its most perfect magnificence, a language which they may never hear or speak again, but which will remain with them as an eternal treasure.”

The value of his fairy tales was established a hundred years after Pushkin’s death when the Soviet Union declared him a national poet. Pushkin’s work was previously banned during the Czarist rule. During the Soviet Union, his tales were seen acceptable for education, since Pushkin’s fairy tales spoke of the poor class and had anti-clerical tones.

== Corpus ==
According to scholarship, some of "most popular or most significant" types of Russian Magic Tales (or Wonder Tales) are the following: (Note: Propp's The Russian Folktale lists types 301, 302, 307, 315, 325, 327, 400, 461, 465, 519, 545B, 555, 560, 567 and 707.)

Tale number	Russian classification	Aarne-Thompson-Uther Index Grouping	Examples	Notes
300	The Winner of the Snake	The Dragon-Slayer	Green-Vanka (second part)	
301	The Three Kingdoms	The Three Stolen Princesses	The Norka; Dawn, Midnight and Twilight	(Note: A preliminary report by Nikolay Andreyev declared that type 301, "The Three Kingdoms and the Stolen Princesses", was among the "most popular types" in Russia, with 45 variants. The type was also the second "most frequently collected in Ukraine", with 31 texts.)
302	Koshchei’s Death in an Egg	Ogre's (Devil's) Heart in the Egg	The Death of Koschei the Deathless	
307	The Girl Who Rose from the Grave	The Princess in the Coffin		(Note: French folklorist Paul Delarue noticed that the tale type, despite existing "throughout Europe", is well known in Russia, where it found "its favorite soil". Likewise, Jack Haney stated that type 307 was "most common" among East Slavs.)
313	Magic Escape	The Magic Flight	The Sea Tsar and Vasilisa the Wise	(Note: A preliminary report by Nikolay Andreyev declared that type 313, "The Magic Flight", was among the "most popular types" in Russia, with 41 variants. The type was also the "most frequently collected" in Ukraine, with 37 texts.)
315	The Feigned Illness (beast’s milk)	The Faithless Sister		
325	Crafty Knowledge	The Magician and his Pupil		(Note: Commenting on a Russian tale collected in the 20th century, Richard Dorson stated that the type was "one of the most widespread Russian Märchen". In the East Slavic populations, scholarship registers 42 Russian variants, 25 Ukrainian and 10 Belarrussian.)
327	Children at Baba Yaga’s Hut	Children and the Ogre		
327C	Ivanushka and the Witch	The Devil (Witch) Carries the Hero Home in a Sack		(Note: According to professor Jack V. Haney, this type of a fishing boy and a witch "[is] common among the various East European peoples." Likewise, according to Andreas Johns, the tale type is "the third most popular Russian folktale".)
400	The husband looks for his wife, who has disappeared or been stolen (or a wife searches for her husband)	The Man on a Quest for The Lost Wife	The Maiden Tsar	
465	The Beautiful Wife	The Man persecuted because of his beautiful wife	Go I Know Not Whither and Fetch I Know Not What	(Note: According to professor Jack V. Haney, the tale type, including previous type AaTh 465A, is "especially common in Russia".)
480	Stepmother and Stepdaughter	The Kind and Unkind Girls	Vasilissa the Beautiful	
519	The Blind Man and the Legless Man	The Strong Woman as Bride (Brunhilde)		(Note: Swedish scholar Carl von Sydow, despite its resemblance to an episode in the German story of the Nibelungenlied, argued for the independent character of the Russian folktales about the "strong bride".) (Note: Russian researcher Dobrovolskaya Varvara Evgenievna stated that tale type ATU 519 (SUS 519) "belongs to the core of" the Russian tale corpus, due to "the presence of numerous variants".) (Note: Following Löwis de Menar's study, Walter Puchner concluded on its diffusion especially in the East Slavic area.) (Note: Stith Thompson also located this tale type across Russia and the Baltic regions.)
531	The Little Hunchback Horse	The Clever Horse	The Humpbacked Horse; The Firebird and Princess Vasilisa	(Note: According to Jack Haney, the tale type "is extremely popular in all three branches of East Slavic".)
555	Kitten-Gold Forehead (a gold fish, a magical tree)	The Fisherman and His Wife	The Tale of the Fisherman and the Fish	(Note: According to professor Jack V. Haney, this type is "common among the East Slavs".) (Note: The variation on the wish-giving entity is also attested in Estonia, whose variants register a golden fish, crayfish, or a sacred tree.)
560	The Magic Ring	The Magic Ring		(Note: According to professor Jack V. Haney, the tale type is "very common in all the East Slavic traditions".) (Note: Wolfram Eberhard reported "45 variants in Russia alone".)
707	The Tale of Tsar Saltan [Marvelous Children]	The Three Golden Children	Tale of Tsar Saltan, The Wicked Sisters	(Note: According to professor Jack V. Haney, the tale type is "a very common East Slavic type".)
709	The Dead Tsarina or The Dead Tsarevna	Snow White	The Tale of the Dead Princess and the Seven Knights	(Note: According to professor Jack V. Haney, the tale type is "especially common in Russian and Ukrainian".)
