= The Lute Player (fairy tale) =

Russian fairy tale

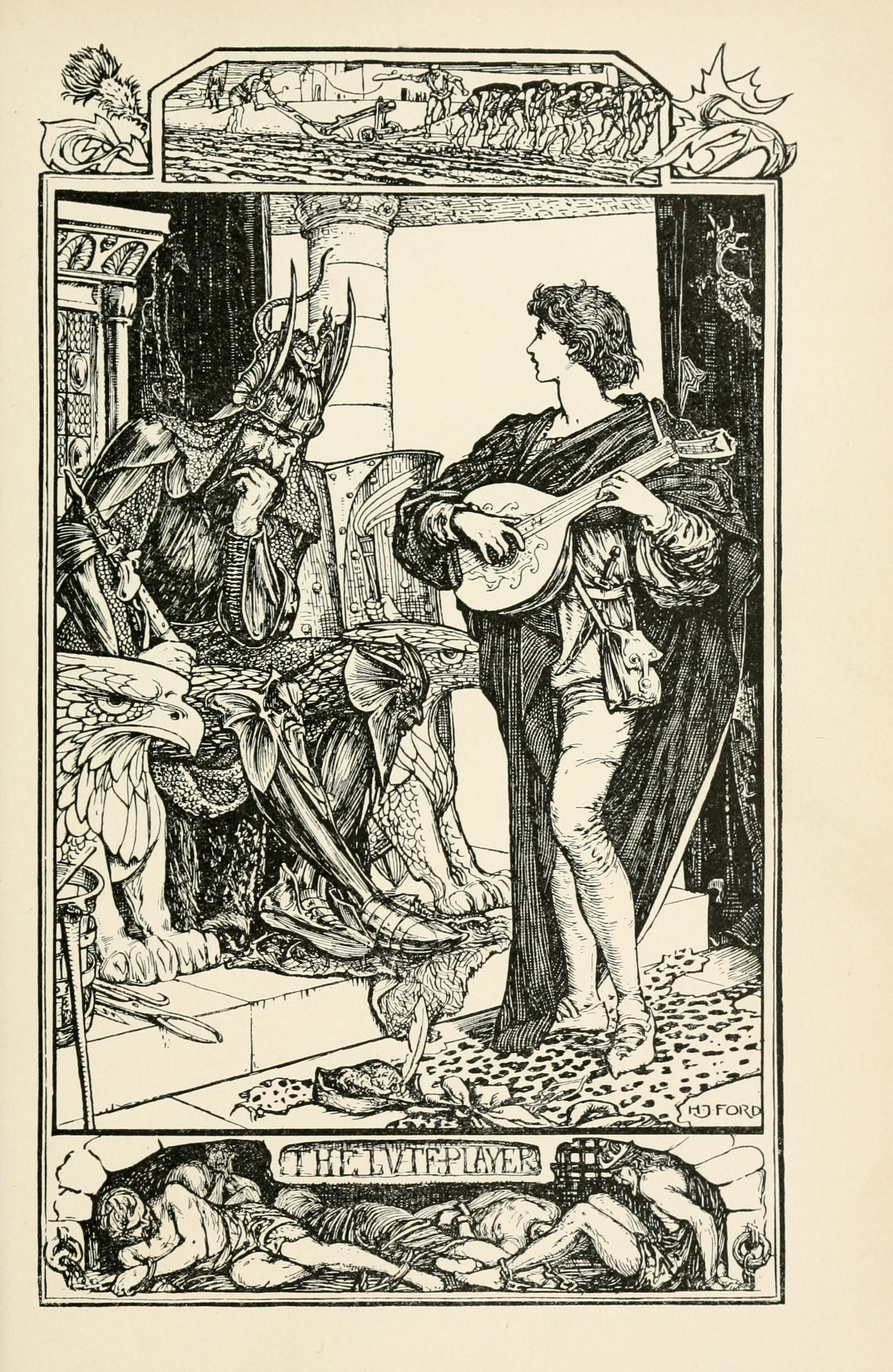
- The lute player (the queen, in disguise) captivates the enemy king with his music. Illustration from The Violet Fairy Book (1906).

Folk tale
- Name: The Lute Player
- Also known as: The Tsaritsa Harpist, The Tsaritsa who Played the Gusli
- Aarne–Thompson grouping: ATU 888 (The Faithful Wife)
- Country: Russia
- Published in: Russian Fairy Tales by Alexander Afanasyev

The Lute Player, The Tsaritsa Harpist or The Tsaritsa who Played the Gusli (Russian: Царица-гусляр), is a Russian fairy tale. It was published by Alexander Afanasyev in his collection Russian Fairy Tales, as number 338. Andrew Lang included it in The Violet Fairy Book (1901).

The instrument actually described in the fairy tale is a gusli.

== Synopsis ==
A king lived happily with his queen, but after a time, wanted to fight and so win glory. He set out against a wicked king, but lost and was captured. He sent a message to his queen to ransom him.

His queen thought that if she went herself, the wicked king would take her as one of his wives, and she did not know whether she could trust her ministers. She cut her hair, disguised herself as a boy, and set out with a gusli. She reached the court of the wicked king and charmed him with her music. He promised her whatever she wished, and she said she wanted a companion on the way, so she asked for one of his prisoners. He let her choose, and she picked the king.

They went back to their country without his discovering who she was. She left him before he reached his court. He was angry that his wife had not ransomed him, and even more angry that she had vanished and just returned, assuming she had been unfaithful. She disguised herself as the musician again, and her husband promised her whatever reward she wished. She told him she wanted him, and revealed she was the queen.

== Analysis ==
=== Tale type ===
The tale is classified in the international Aarne-Thompson-Uther Index as tale type ATU 888, "The Faithful Wife".

The tale was also classified as type AaTh 875C, "The Queen as Gusli-Player", in the 1961 revision of the index by Stith Thompson. However, after German folklorist Hans-Jörg Uther revised the index in 2004, type 875D was subsumed into type ATU 888, "The Faithful Wife".

== See also ==
- Sir Orfeo
