= The Norka =

Russian and Ukrainian fairy tale

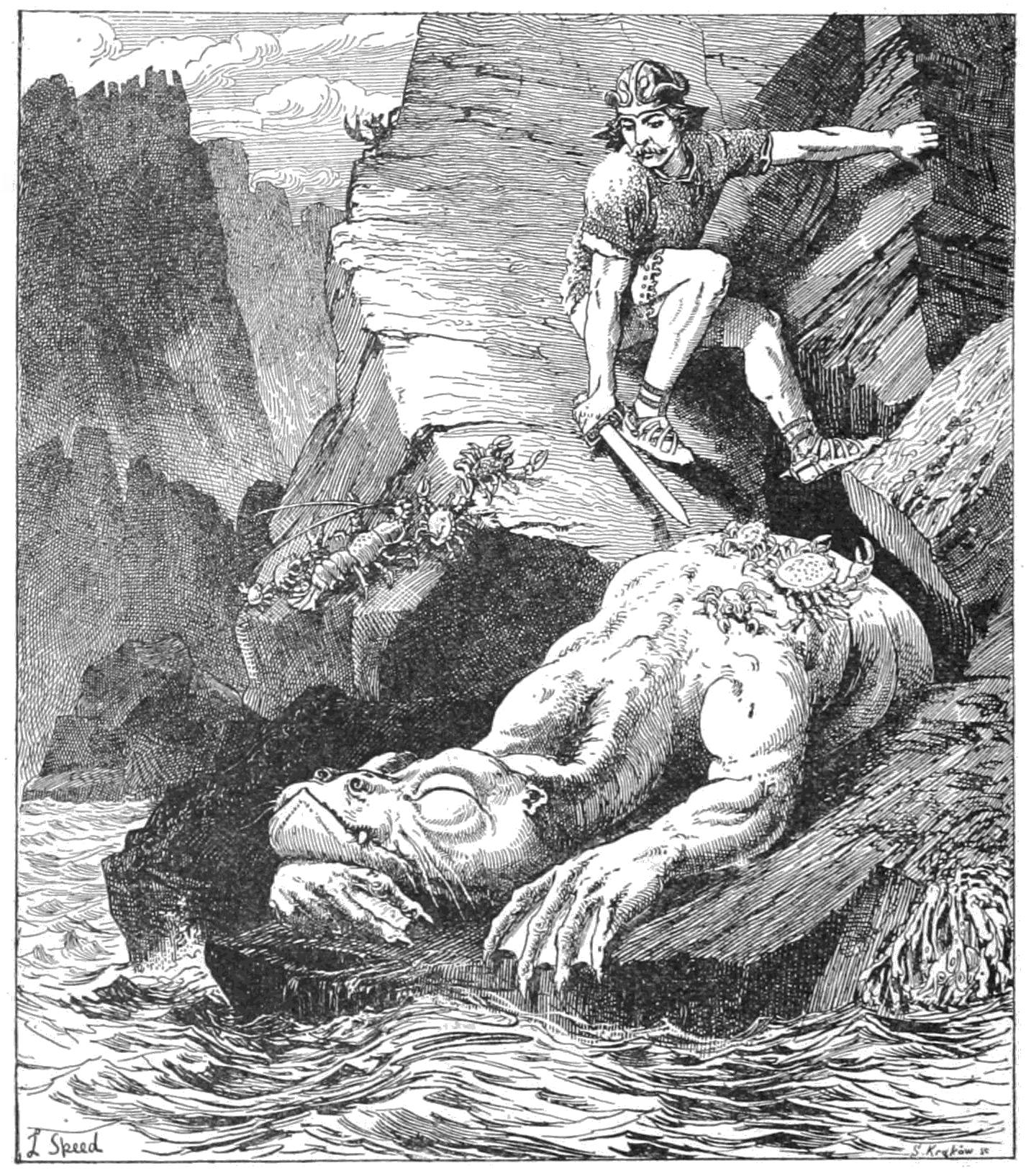
- The youngest prince defeats the fierce Norka by the sea cliffs. Illustration from The Red Fairy Book.

Folk tale
- Name: The Norka
- Aarne–Thompson grouping: ATU 301 (Three Stolen Princesses)
- Region: Eastern Europe
- Published in: Russian Fairy Tales by Alexander Afanasyev (1865); Russian Folk-Tales, by William Ralston Shedden-Ralston (1873)
- Related: The Three Kingdoms (fr); Dawn, Midnight and Twilight

The Norka (Russian: «Норка-зверь», romanized: Norka-zver', lit. 'Norka-Animal'; Ukrainian: «Норка») is a Russian and Ukrainian fairy tale published by Alexander Afanasyev in his collection of Russian Fairy Tales, numbered 132.

== Origin ==
William Ralston Shedden-Ralston indicated the story originated in the Southern Russian Empire, from the Chernigov Governorate (an area roughly consistent with the Chernihiv Oblast in modern Ukraine, but also including parts of Sumy Oblast in Ukraine and Bryansk Oblast in Russia). Czech folklorist Karel Jaromír Erben asserts the same tale.

== Summary ==
The King is unable to destroy the Norka, a huge beast who is devouring his animals. He offers half his kingdom to any one of his sons who kills the Norka. The two eldest sons drink and revel instead of hunting the beast. The youngest third son, a simpleton, wounds and chases the beast. The beast escapes under a great stone. The third son descends to the underworld and meets a talking horse who calls him Ivan and takes him to a copper palace owned by a beautiful woman, a sister of the Norka. He travels to a silver palace and a golden palace, also owned by the sisters of the Norka. The third and youngest sister tells him that Norka is asleep on the sea. She gives him a sword and the Water of Strength, and tells him to cut off her brother's head with a single stroke. He cuts off the Norka's head, which says "Well, I'm done for now!", and rolls into the sea.

The three sisters are in love with him, so he takes them with him to the surface world. They change their palaces into eggs with magic, teach him how to do it, and give him the eggs. His brothers pull the three maidens up, but try to kill the third son by cutting the rope halfway up. He substituted a stone for himself, however, so he was not killed. Stranded in the underworld, he sadly wandered away as it rains. He covers some baby birds with his coat to protect them from the rain. The giant mother bird is grateful and carries him to the surface.

A tailor tells him that the two princes are going to marry the maidens from the underworld, but the maidens refuse to be married until wedding dresses are made in the underworld style, and without measuring them. The third son tells the tailor to accept the job to make the clothes for the wedding. At night, the third son turns the eggs into palaces, takes the maiden's clothes from the palaces, and turns the palaces into eggs again. He gives the dresses to the tailor who is paid richly by the King. He visits the shoemaker and other artificers and does the same thing. The youngest maiden recognizes him (in rags), grabs him, and takes him to the palace. She explains to the king what happened and that the brothers threatened to kill them if they said the third son was alive. The King punishes the two brothers. Three weddings are celebrated.

== Translations ==
Folklorist Andrew Lang translated and published the tale in The Red Fairy Book. Although he gave no source for the tale, it was taken verbatim from the book Russian Folk-tales by W. R. S. Ralston, published in 1873 by Smith, Elder, & co. and re-published by Kessinger Publishing in 2004.

A version published by folklorist Karel Jaromír Erben was translated as Norka, the Beast.

Professor Jack Haney translated the tale as The Norka Beast.

== Analysis ==
=== Tale type ===
William Ralston Shedden-Ralston noted that this plot (the third/youngest prince descends into an underworld and rescues three maidens) "form[ed] the theme of numerous skazkas".

Soon after he developed his classification of folktales, Finnish folklorist Antti Aarne published, in 1912, a study on the collections of the Brothers Grimm, Austrian consul Johann Georg von Hahn, Danish folklorist Svend Grundtvig, Swiss scholar Laura Gonzenbach and Alexander Afanasyev. According to this primary system, developed in 1910, the tale fits type 301A, (Note: The third revision of the Aarne-Thompson classification system, made in 2004 by German folklorist Hans-Jörg Uther, subsumed both subtypes AaTh 301A and AaTh 301B into the new type ATU 301.) "The Three Stolen Princesses".

Professor Jack Haney confirmed the classification of the tale as AT 301, "The Three Stolen Princesses". In fact, the tale type, also known as "Three Kingdoms - Copper, Silver and Golden", is one of "the most popular Russian folktales", as well as "one of the most popular in the East Slavic tradition". In Ukraine alone, professor Nikolai P. Andrejev noted that, among the "Tales of Magic", tale type 301, "The Three Kingdoms and the Stolen Princesses", was one of "the most frequently collected", with 31 variants.

=== Motifs ===
Both William Ralston Shedden-Ralston and scholar Jack Haney pointed out that the name "Norka" must refer to the European otter, Mustela lutreola.

In regards to the journey on the eagle's back, folklorist scholarship recognizes its similarities with the tale of Etana helping an eagle, a tale type later classified as Aarne–Thompson–Uther ATU 537, "The Eagle as helper: hero carried on the wings of a helpful eagle".

== See also ==
- Prâslea the Brave and the Golden Apples (Romanian fairy tale)
- The Story of Bensurdatu (Italian fairy tale)
- Dawn, Midnight and Twilight (Russian fairy tale)
- Jean de l'Ours
- The Gnome (German fairy tale)
- Kotyhoroshko (Ukrainian tale)

== Sources ==
- Ralston, William Ralston Shedden (1873). Russian Folk-tales. Smith, Elder, & Company. hdl:2027/uc1.31158010565728. OCLC 574481117.
