= Con Starkel =

Russo-American baseball player (1880–1933)

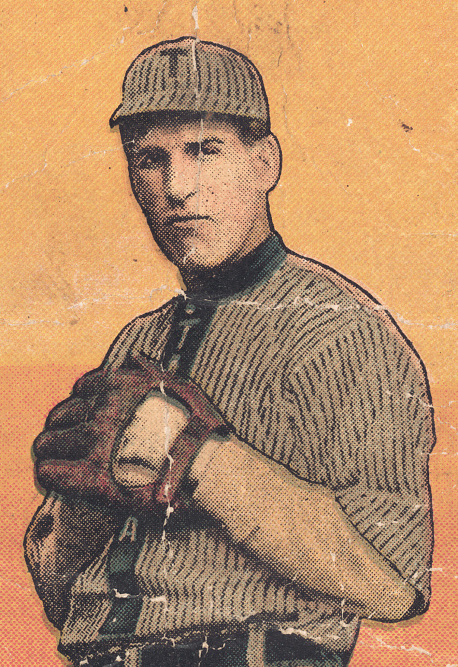
- Pitcher
- Born: November 16, 1880; Neu-Norka, Russian Empire
- Died: January 19, 1933 (aged 52); Tacoma, Washington, U.S.
- Batted: Right Threw: Right

MLB debut
- April 19, 1906, for the Washington Senators

Last MLB appearance
- April 19, 1906, for the Washington Senators

MLB statistics
- Win–loss record: 0–0
- Earned run average: 18.00
- Strikeouts: 1
- Stats at Baseball Reference

Teams
- Washington Senators (1906)

Conrad Starkel (November 16, 1880 – January 19, 1933) was a professional baseball player who played pitcher in the Major Leagues in 1906. He would play in one game for the Washington Senators.
