= Milena Benovska-Sabkova =

Bulgarian sociologist

Milena Benovska-Sabkova (Bulgarian: Милена Беновска-Събкова; born 1954) is Bulgarian researcher in ethnology / sociocultural anthropology.

She holds MA in Slavic philology (St. Kliment Ohridski University, 1975), Ph.D. in historical sciences (1990), and dr.hab. in history (2001). Her positions include research fellow and senior research fellow at the Institute of Ethnology and Folklore Studies in Sofia (1976-2002), professor at New Bulgarian University (2002-2019) and South-West University "Neofit Rilski" (since 2010).

== Monographs ==
- Змеят в българския фолклор [The Dragon in Bulgarian Folklore] (1992, 1995)
- Политически преход и всекидневна култура (2001)
- Orthodox Revivalism in Russia: Driving forces and moral quests (2020)

== Collections ==
- Българска народна поезия и проза. Т. 5.Любовни песни (1982)
- Регионални проучвания на българския фолклор. Т. 3. Фолклорните традиции на Североизточна България (1993)
- Паранормалното (Български фолклор, книга 5, 1993)
