= Neu-Norka =

Neu-Norka was a Volga German colony located about 57 miles south of Norka (now known as Nekrasovo in Saratovskaya Oblast) and about 100 miles south of Saratov. It was founded in 1852 and by the 1930s had well over 1,000 residents. It was depopulated in 1941 following the Nazi invasion of the USSR, preceding the abolition of the Volga German Autonomous Soviet Socialist Republic.

Con Starkel, one of the only Russian-born MLB players, was born here.
