= Nork =

Nork or NORK may refer to:

== Places ==
- Nork, Yerevan, Armenia
- Nork, Surrey, England

== Slang ==
- Nork, slang for a Norinco firearm
- Nork, a slang demonym for North Koreans
- Norks, Australian slang for breasts

== Other uses ==
- Bob Nork (1906–1983), American football and basketball player
- New Orleans Rhythm Kings, an early 1920s jazz band
