= Russian Fairy Tales =

19th century fairy tale collection

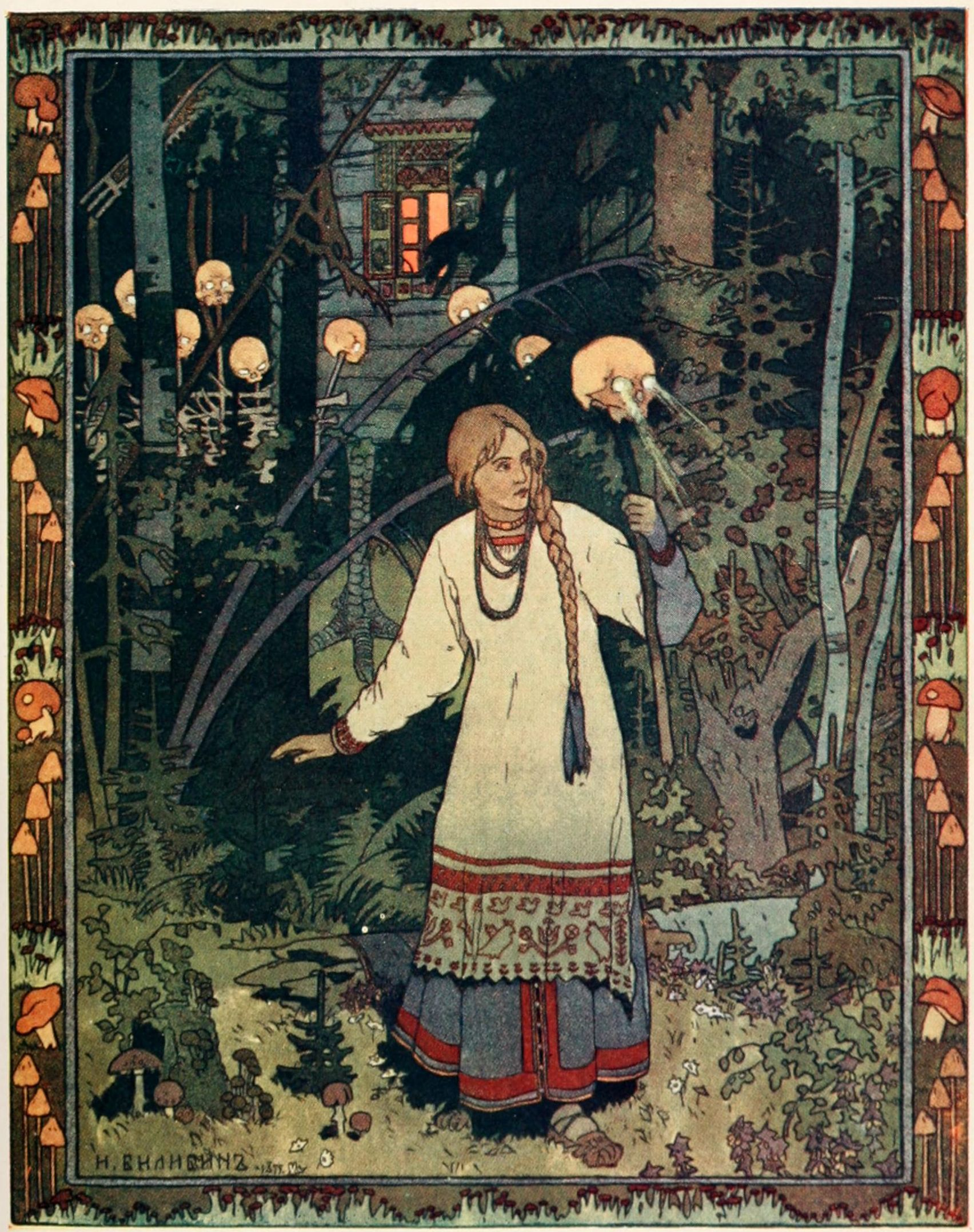
Vasilisa the Beautiful at the Hut of Baba Yaga, illustration by Ivan Bilibin

Russian Fairy Tales (Russian: Народные русские сказки, variously translated; English titles include also Russian Folk Tales) is a collection of nearly 600 fairy and folktales, collected and published by Alexander Afanasyev between 1855 and 1863. The collection contained fairy and folk tales from Ukraine and Belarus alongside Russian stories. In compiling the work, Afanasyev's editing was informed by the German Grimm's Fairy Tales, Slovak tales collected by Pavol Dobšinský, Božena Němcová's work, Vuk Karadžić's Serbian tales, and other Norwegian, French, and Romanian research.

Vladimir Propp drew heavily on this collection for his analyses in his Morphology of the Folktale.

== Fairy tales ==
Some of the tales included in these volumes:

- The Death of Koschei the Immortal
- Vasilisa the Beautiful
- Vasilisa the Priest's Daughter
- Father Frost
- Sister Alenushka, Brother Ivanushka
- The Frog Princess
- Vasilii the Unlucky
- The White Duck
- The Princess Who Never Smiled
- Snegurochka, or The Snow Maiden
- The Wicked Sisters
- The Twelve Dancing Princesses
- The Magic Swan Geese
- The Feather of Finist the Falcon
- Tsarevitch Ivan, the Firebird and the Gray Wolf
- The Sea Tsar and Vasilisa the Wise
- The Bold Knight, the Apples of Youth, and the Water of Life
- Go I Know Not Whither and Fetch I Know Not What
- The Golden Slipper
- The Firebird and Princess Vasilisa
- The Armless Maiden
- The Gigantic Turnip
- Emelya the Simpleton
- Dawn, Midnight and Twilight
- The Fiend or The Vampire (Upyr)
- The Lute Player
- The Language of the Birds
- The Norka
- The Maiden Tsar
- Sivko-Burko
- Donotknow
