= Prâslea the Brave and the Golden Apples =

Romanian fairy tale

Folk tale
- Name: Prâslea the Brave and the Golden Apples
- Aarne–Thompson grouping: ATU 301 ("The Three Stolen Princesses")
- Mythology: Romanian
- Country: Romania

Prâslea the Brave and the Golden Apples (Romanian: Prâslea cel voinic și merele de aur) is a Romanian fairy tale collected by Petre Ispirescu in Legende sau basmele românilor.

It is classified in the Aarne-Thompson-Uther Index as tale type ATU 301, "The Three Stolen Princesses". This type refers to a set of stories where three heroes (or three brothers) approach a cave or hollow and send one of them down to rescue three captured princesses, albeit with a localized opening about the heroes standing guard on the king's garden for a nocturnal thief that leads them down the hole.

== Synopsis ==
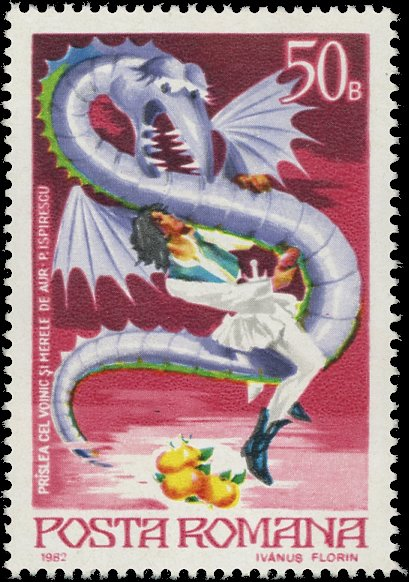

A king had a magnificent garden with a tree that bore golden apples, but he never ate them, because every year, the apples were stolen as they became ripe. None of his guards could catch the thief. His oldest two sons tried, one year after the other, but fell asleep near midnight. The next year, the youngest son, Prâslea, tried. He set up two stakes to prick him if he ever started to lean in his sleep. At midnight, he heard rustling and shot an arrow. In the morning, a trail of blood led away, and the apples were ripe.

The king was pleased, but Prâslea wanted to track the thief. He and his brothers followed the blood to a ravine, where the older two brothers tried to have the others lower each one of them, grew frightened, and came back. Prâslea had them lower him. He found a copper castle. There, a lovely maiden told him she was a princess, and that the ogres (Zmeu) that had kidnapped her and her two sisters had wanted to marry them, but the sisters had put them off with demands. He fought with the ogre there and killed him; went on to the second castle, of silver, and killed the second ogre; went on the third castle, of gold, where the ogre thief was, and wrestled with him as well. It was a longer fight, and Prâslea called on a raven to drop some tallow on him, in return for three corpses. This strengthened him, and he fought on. Then both the ogre and Prâslea called on the princess there to give them water; she gave it to Prâslea, and he killed the ogre.

The princesses showed him a magic whip that made golden apples. Each of them took one. Prâslea brought the princesses back and sent them up. The older two told the brothers that they would marry them. Then Prâslea sent up a stone with his cap. His brothers dropped it, to kill him, and married the older sisters.

Prâslea saved some eaglets from a dragon, and their mother, in gratitude, carried him to the other world. There, he found that the youngest princess was being pressed to accept a suitor. She said that she would accept only if she received a golden distaff and spindle that would spin of themselves, because the ogre had given her one. Prâslea went to work for the silversmith who had to do this and brought out the one the ogre had given her, using the golden apple. The princess then demanded a golden hen with golden chick, and when he produced it, insisted that he be brought before her, because he had to have the golden apple. They recognized Prâslea. He and his brothers went outside and shot arrows into the air. The brothers' arrows hit and killed them, but Prâslea's hit the ground. He married the youngest princess.

== Translations ==
The tale was also translated to Hungarian with the name Prislea vitéz és az aranyalmák ("The Hero Prislea and the Golden Apples").

The tale was translated into English with the title Gallant Young Praslea and the Golden Apples and Prislea the Brave and the Golden Apples.

== Variants ==
=== Asia ===
==== Iran ====
German scholar Ulrich Marzolph, in his catalogue of Persian folktales, identified a similar narrative in the Iranian tale corpus: type 301, Erlebnisse in der Unterwelt ("Adventure in the Underworld"). According to his index, the type registers 6 Persian variants, five of which begin with the episode of the apple (or flower) thief; then segues into the hero's descent to the underworld to release three princesses, his journey to an even deeper underworld to face a dragon blocking the waters of a kingdom, and his ride back to the surface on the Simorġ's back. However, in a later study, professor Mehri Bagheri stated that this narrative is "well-known" in Iran and neighbouring countries, with more than 20 versions collected in the former. In these tales, the hero's name is Malik Mohammad, and the story is alternatively known as "The Tale of Prince Mohammad", "The Tale of the Apple Orchard", "The Apple Tree and the Dev", or "Prince Djamshid's Tale".

==== Iraq ====
According to Russian professor V. A. Yaremenko, the story of a thief in the night who comes to steal the king's golden apples and the hero who stops him is "very common in almost every part of Iraq". Professor Amar Annus reached a similar conclusion in regards to the tale.

In an Iraqi variant, a king with three sons, Ahmad, Mahmud and Muhammed, owns a tree with beautiful blossoms, but lately it has been losing them. So he orders his sons to guard the tree; only the youngest discovers the culprit: a huge monster, a marid. The tale continues as the third prince descends through the well, kills the marid and rescues a single princess from an underground palace. They meet an old man on their way with two rams, a black and a white one. He explains the magical abilities of his two rams; the princess jumps onto the white ram and is transported to the surface. The prince jumps onto the black one and is carried further into the underworld, to "the seventh underworld kingdom". He goes near a tree, kills an approaching snake and protects a nest of eaglets. Their mother eagle arrives and agrees to take the prince to the surface.

==== Turkey ====
In the Typen türkischer Volksmärchen ("Turkish Folktale Catalogue"), by Wolfram Eberhard and Pertev Naili Boratav, both scholars classified a cycle of stories they named TTV 72, "Der Phönix" ("The Phoenix"). According to their classification, the Turkish variants follow the vigil on the garden and the rescue of the three princesses in the underworld, then segues into the dragon slaying episode of the deeper underworld (ATU 300), and lastly returns the hero to the surface.

==== Assyrian people ====
In a tale collected from the Assyrian people and published by Russo-Assyrian author Konstantin P. (Bar-Mattai) Matveev with the title "Царь и три сына" ("The Emperor and the Three Sons"), an emperor has three sons and a prized apple tree in the garden, whose fruits are stolen every year. He orders his sons to stand guard and discover the culprit. Only the youngest, named Mirza-Mamed, finds out and shoots the thief. He calls out for his brothers to follow the trail that leads to a hole in the ground. Mirza-Mamed descends and enters a gated castle. He finds and releases three princesses from the devas and leads them back to his brothers. The youngest princess tells him that, if he gets trapped down there, he should go to her room, get four dice and throw it at the wall; four rams will appear and he must jump on the white one. He jumps on the black one and is led further down, to another kingdom menaced by a dragon that blocked the flow of water. He defeats this dragon, kills a second one that threatened the nest of the Simurgh. He saves the chicks and their father takes Mirza-Mamed back to his realm.

==== Azerbaijan ====
Azerbaijani scholarship indexes the tale as the Azerbaijani tale type 301, "Oğurlanmış üç şahzadə qız" ("Three kidnapped princesses"). In the Azeri type, the brothers guard the apple tree, but only the younger discover the culprit: a div is stealing the apples. The brothers follow the blood trail to a well and climb down; the young hero goes down the well, defeats the div and rescues three princesses, whom he sends to the upper world; the hero's brothers betray him, cut the rope and abandon him in the lower world. The hero then kills a snake or dragon that threatens the Simurgh bird, which promises to help to carry the hero out of the lower world.

In an ancient tale about Malik Mammad, the son of one of the wealthiest kings of Azerbaijan, that king had a big garden. In the center of this garden was a magical apple tree that yielded apples every day. An ugly giant named Div stole all the apples every night. The king sent Malik Mammad and his elder brothers to fight the giant. In the course of this tale, Malik Mammad saves Simurgh's babies from a dragon. In return, Simurgh resolved to help Malik Mammad. When Malik Mammad wanted to pass from The Dark world into the Light world, Simurgh asked him to provide 40 half carcasses of meat and 40 wineskins filled with water. When Simurgh put the water on its left wing and the meat on its right wing, Malik Mammad was able to enter the Light world.

A variant of the Azeri folktale involves a bird named Zumrud.

==== Armenia ====
In an Armenian variant titled The Adventures of a Prince, first published in the compilation Manana, the king has fallen ill and sends his three sons to a distant land (India) to recover the apple-fruits from a Tree of Immortality. However, whenever the fruits ripen, the devs takes them. So the princes alternate on guard duty to get the fruits. The elder ones fail, but the youngest, on the third year, hurts the dev and brings home with him the apples to heal his father. The youngest prince convinces his brothers to return to tree and follow the hurt dev to its hideout. The prince descends down a rope, rescues three maidens, kills their serpentine captors and sends the maidens back to his brothers. His brothers betray him and leave him for dead in the cave. He finds three rams, a white, a red and a black one, but jumps on the wrong one (the black one) and is taken deep into the "Land of Darkness". He arrives at another kingdom, kills a dragon that blocked the flow of waters and rescues a nest of eaglets. Out of gratitude, the eagle mother promises to give the prince a ride back to the upper world, the "Land of Light". A very similar tale was collected by Grikor Chalatianz with the title Der Lebensapfel ("The Apple of Life").

In another Armenian variant, Apples of Immortality, the king has an "Apple-Tree of Immortality" in his garden. For some time, some thing has been eating the apples, so the king orders his three sons to guard the three. For the next two years, the elder son and the middle son fail the duty, but the youngest discovers it is a giant monster, He strikes and hurts the creature, which then flees through a deep well. The youngest climbs down the well and finds three "houri-maidens", guarded by three multi-headed dragons. He kills the dragons and brings the maidens to the rope. One of the houri-maidens suspects a possible treason on the prince's brothers and warns him to find the three rams (red, white and black) that can bring him back to the surface. He is betrayed and gets stranded in the underground. He finds the three rams, jumps on the black one and is taken to another kingdom underground that is menaced by a dragon. The prince kills this seven-headed dragon that blocked the water sources and the princess reveals another way to reach the surface: the Emerald-Bird. The prince finds its nest and protects it from a Dragon. The Emerald Bird, in return, brings him back to the upper world.

In an Armenian tale, The Youngest of the Three, a sick king sends his sons to fetch the Apple of Life in a garden in India, which is guarded by giants. Only the youngest prince, on the third year, hurts the giant and gets the apple, which he takes to his father. The prince then returns to the garden and follows a trail of blood to a "deep abyss". He descends and meets three maidens from giants. He gets a "sword of lightning" and tufts of hair from three different coloured "horses of lightning" (one black, one red, and one white). The third maiden advises him that, if he ever gets stuck down there, three rams, one black, one red and one white, and he should jump on the black ram first. The prince is betrayed by his two brothers and abandoned in the hole; he finds the three rams and jumps on the white ram first, and is taken further into "the world of darkness". The story continues with the rescue of a maiden that is to be sacrificed to a dragon, and a nest of eaglets from a second one. The mother eagle takes him to the world of light. The tale concludes with the third prince summoning the three differently coloured horses and taking part in a tournament as a mysterious knight. This tale was provided by author A. G. Seklemian, who claimed that the story was passed down in his family, from his paternal grandmother, who learned from her grandmother.

Scholar C. V. Trever listed two Kurdish tales and one Armenian that contain the episode of the rescue of the bird chicks by killing a snake enemy. In the Armenian folktale, the hero is told to seek out the bird Sīnam so that he may escape back to earth. Once the hero reaches the Sinam's nest, he sees a serpent (Višap) ready to strike at the nest, but he kills it. In return, the Sinam mother agrees to take him on its back on a journey to the world above. In this version there is the motif of the hero sacrificing part of his flesh to give meat to the bird to finish the journey, but he is healed soon after.

==== Kurdish people ====
A similar story also exists in the folktale corpus of the Kurdish people. According to the Catalogue of Kurdish Folktales, in tale type 301, "Die drei geraubten Prizessinen" ("The Three Stolen Princesses"), three brothers follow a demon to a well, where he is keeping three princesses captive; the third brother kills the demon and releases the princesses, then sends them to the upper world; the princesses alert the hero to watch out for the white ram, not the black one; the hero is betrayed by his elder brothers and stranded in the undergrond; he looks for a way out, but jumps on the black ram and is taken to a deeper underworld, where he fights a dragon and releases the blocked waters (tale type 300); he also kills a snake to protect the Sīmorġ's chicks, and is brought to the upper world by the grateful bird; at the end, he returns home, kills his brothers and marries the youngest princess. The tale type registers 21 variants across Kurdish sources. The episode of the hero killing the dragon and releasing the waters, then killing the snake to protect the Simurg's nest is classified as an independent, but connected, type, *301E* Marzolph, "Ein junger Mann rettet die Kinder der Sīmorġ" ("A Youth rescues the Sīmorġ's children").

Scholar C. V. Trever listed two Kurdish tales and one Armenian that contain the episode of the rescue of the bird chicks by killing a snake enemy. In one version, the hero saves the nestlings of the bird Sīmīr (the Kurdish reflex of Persian Simurgh), and the bird gives him three feathers (this version lacks the escape from the underworld). In the second, the bird Simir carries the hero out of the underworld.

=== Europe ===
==== France ====
Researcher Genevieve Massignon stated that the theft of the golden fruits "is frequently found in France" as the opening episode of type 301A.

In a French tale from Poitou, Les pommes d’or ("The Golden Apples"), a king owns a precious tree with golden fruits in his beautiful garden, but every night the fruits are stolen by something. He orders his sons to discover the culprit; his two elder sons feel so frightened that they fail the night watch. Only the youngest finds out who the thief was: a "giant lion" that comes from a giant rock. The prince and his brothers lift the rock up and see a pit that leads underground. The youngest descends and rescues three maidens from their leonine captors, one in the castle of white iron ("fer blanc"), the second from the silver castle and the third from the golden castle. This variant lacks the flight on the eagle's back, however.

In a variant from Lower Brittany, collected by François-Marie Luzel with the title Le poirier aux poires d’or ("The Pear Tree with the Golden Pears"), a king owns a peart tree that yields golden fruits, but every night there is a golden pear missing. His three sons stand guard at night, the older two fall sleep fail, but the youngest discovers it is an eagle. He shoots an arrow to harm the bird and it escapes with an injury, leaving a trail of blood for them to follow. They arrive at an opening that leads underground. The youngest is brave enough to descend into the dark pit in a basket until he reaches the bottom. He arrives at a forest and talks to an old woman about the avian thief. The old woman says the eagle is her son. He goes on and sees the eagle perched on the walls of a steel castle. The eagle notices the prince and flies away with a huge shriek. The prince enters the castle and meets a princess, who reveals she is the daughter of the king of Spain, and that she and her sisters have been trapped in the underworld for 500 by the eagle (a great magician). The prince continues his search and goes to a silver and a golden castle, where the two other princesses are being kept. The princess of the golden castle gives the prince the magician's sword and he impales the eagle with it. The four return to the basket and before the girls are pulled up, they each give their saviour a different coloured slipper. His brothers pull the princesses up, but leave the youth stranded underground. The prince returns to the old lady, who advises him to use her son, the eagle-magician, to carry him back to the surface.

==== Italy ====
In an Italian fairy tale from Tuscany, The Three Golden Apples, the king owns a tree with golden apples, but every year some monster steals them. He orders his sons to guard it; the youngest discovers it is a dragon and harms the creature. It escapes through a hole and the king sends men to dig a well for his sons to follow it. The youngest climbs down the well and reaches another world. His first stop is an old woman's house who informs him of a dragon that blocked the flows of waters. He kills it and later takes the opportunity to hack and slash every serpent down below. By doing this he saved an eagle. He returns to the old woman's house who, in gratitude, offers her daughters' hand in marriage for him and his brothers. As soon as the three maidens are brought out of the well, his brothers cut down the rope and leave him stranded in the underground. He soon enlists the eagle's help to take him back to the surface.

==== Greece ====
In a tale from the island of Lesbos, The Three Robes of Wonder, a king owns a beautiful apple-tree that produces golden trees, but the tree is attacked once every year by a dragon. The three princes promise to stay awake to catch the dragon, but only the youngest is successful. He strikes the dragon with a javelin and follows the blood trail to a deep black well. The youngest prince descends into the well and finds an immense kingdom. He wanders to a castle where "three lovely angels" (princesses, in this case) are held captive by the dragon. The prince leads them to the rope to escape the well, but the youngest princess alerts him about a possible treason by his brothers. So she gives him three nuts, each containing a beautiful robe: the first of heavens and stars, the second with the earth and flowers, and the third with the sea and all its fishes. It just so happens and the prince is stranded in the underground kingdom. Wandering about, he finds an old man who informs him about two rams: the white one can take him to the surface, the black one will take him deep into that realm. (Note: Professor Michael Meraklis remarked that this episode is "usual" in Greek variants, and also happens "in many Anatolian versions".) He jumps onto the black ram and arrives at another kingdom, where a princess is to be sacrificed to a dragon that blocks the flow of water (a feature of tale type ATU 300, "The Dragon-Slayer"). The prince rescues this fourth princess, saves eaglets from a snake and their father, the King of Eagles, in gratitude, takes him back to the surface world. The betrayed prince finds a job as a tailor and uses the magical nuts to produce the three marvellous robes to give to the youngest princess he rescued. This tale was first published by Henry Carnoy and Jean Nicolaïdes in Tradition populaires de l'Asie Mineure.

Another variant from Lesbos, Les Pommes d'Or ("The Golden Apples"), follows this structure very closely: the invasion of the garden by an unknown thief; the night watch; the descent through a hole; the finding of three princesses in underground castles or houses. The youngest prince rescues the maidens and takes them to the rope for them to be pulled up to the surface, but his brothers betray him and cut the rope. The prince, in the underground hideout, finds an old eagle, which takes him to the upper world. Close to the wedding of the youngest princess to his elder brother, the prince orders the sewing of three garments: the first of the sky filled with stars, the second of the earth with its flowers and the third of the sea and its fishes.

In a tale collected by Austrian consul Johann Georg von Hahn in Syra, Der Goldäpfelbaum und die Höllenfahrt ("The Tree of Golden Apples and the Journey to Hell"), a king has a tree with golden apples that attracts some thing to steal its lustrous fruits. The three princes stand guard to watch over the tree: the culprit is a "dark cloud of thunder and lightning" that holds out a hand to steal the apple. The youngest harms it and follows a trail of blood to a hole with three stones with inscriptions. The prince and his brothers decide to lift the stone that says that there is no exit through there. The prince finds a magnificent castle where three princesses are kept captive, the first ones playing with a golden apple each and the third not having any. He kills the dragons by following the instructions of the princesses and takes them to the rope. The youngest princess warns him of a possible betrayal and suggests he should return to the castle and fetch some items. She also alerts him of the existence of three lambs in this underworld: either of the black ones shall take him further into the underworld, so he should take the white one. His brothers betray him and leave him for dead in the cave. He then finds the three lambs and jumps onto the black one. He is taken to another kingdom whose princess is to be sacrificed to a dragon to restore the water sources. The prince kills this second dragon and releases the princess. After the exposal of the false dragon killer, the king thanks the youth and indicates to him the place where he can find eagles that may take him to the surface, but he must kill a many-headed serpent that menaces the nest. He kills the dragon, rescues the eaglets and their parents take him home in the surface. The prince apprentices himself to a tailor and produces three tokens of identification that subtly give away that he manages to escape the underworld.

In a second variant collected by von Hahn from Tinos, there is still the vigil on the tree at night against the thief (a drakos), but the princesses are held captive in an underground chamber. The prince kills the drakos and liberates the maidens, but his brothers, envious of him, slam the trapdoor and lock him down there. Fortunately, he escapes by finding another trapdoor in the chamber and entering it. He finds another kingdom menaced by a seven-headed dragon and rescues a princess ("the Andromeda formula", as von Hahn called it). The princess, in order to find her saviour, invites every male of the underground kingdom to a banquet. She picks him apart from the crowd and he reveals his origins. The king states his daughter is the "queen of the birds" and she summons all birds to help him, designating the largest of them to take him to the surface.

In a tale collected by William Roger Paton from a woman in the island of Lesbos, The Three Apples, a king with a prized apple-tree that bears three golden apples every year finds out that a thief comes and takes the fruits. His three sons promise to stand guard, but only the youngest discovers it is a gigantic ogre. He cuts off the ogre's hand with his sword and follows a trail of blood to a slab of marble that leads to a well. The youngest descends, finds three maidens in rooms. The third maiden, the most beautiful of the three, insists that her saviour goes before her, because she suspects a betrayal on the hero's brothers. The prince refuses, but she advises him to find a pair of sheep, one black and one white, and to jump onto the white one. Before she leaves the well, she gives him a nut with three dresses: one with the fields and their flowers, another with the sea and its fishes, and the third with the heaven and its stars. He is betrayed, jumps onto the black sheep and is taken deeper into the underworld to an old woman's house. The old woman explains about a seven-headed dragon that blocks the spring and demands girls as payment. The prince kills the dragon and later rests under a plane-tree, upon which perched "all the birds of heaven". The prince kills a "beast" that hissed and was about to kill the birds, and they, in gratitude, agree to take him to the upper world.

==== Albania ====
In an Albanian tale published by Albanologist Robert Elsie with the title The Scurfhead, a king with three sons has a tree that grows three quinces every year, but a dragon always appears to eat the fruits. His sons decide to protect the tree: the two elders fail, but the youngest, nicknamed "Scurfhead", hurts the dragon and plans to follow a blood trail he left behind. Scurfhead comes across a hole and descends through a white rope. Down there, he finds an iron slab, pulls it and goes down a staircase. He then finds three Earthly Beauties, each one in a different house, who tell them they will be freed if anyone kills the dragon. The youth walks a bit more and reaches a underworld kingdom, whose king must offer his daughter to appease a dragon. He kills the dragon, releases the four maidens and decides to take the three Earthly Beauties to the surface, to his brothers. After two of the Earthly Beauties are raised out of the hole, the youngest warns Scurfhead of his brothers' possible betrayal and advises him to go back to the dragon's lair and ride on a white ram back to the surface. It happens as the Earthly Beauty predicted, and he is forced to find the white ram, but jumps onto a black ram. Now further in the underworld, he finds an oak tree with a nest of young eagles, menaced by a snake. The youth kills the snake and their father, in gratitude, promises to take him back to the surface (this variant lacks the offering of food to the eagle, present in several other tales of the same type). Now in the surface, Scurfhead finds three feathers that allow him to summon three mares. At the end of the tale, the king sets a challenge: to jump very high and reach a golden apple in a bag. Scurfhead uses a feather to summon a golden mare and a golden armour, beats the challenge and marries the youngest Earthly Beauty.

==== Bulgaria ====
In a Bulgarian tale, "Тримата братя и златната ябълка" ("The Three Brothers and the Golden Apple" - the name of the tale type in Bulgarian sources), an old widow has a golden apple tree in her backyard. Every year, some creature steals the golden fruits. Her eldest son offers to guard it, but fails. The next year, the middle son decides to guard it, but also fails. The youngest, then, offers to guard the tree by hiding among its branches. One night, a dragon-like creature appears to steal the fruits, but the youth hurts it with his blade. Following a trail of blood, the youth and his brothers arrive at a cave. The youngest climbs down the cave and enters a house deep down the cave. There, he sees three maidens, two playing with a golden apple and another with a golden mouse. He convinces them to follow him to the rope and to be taken to the surface. The youngest princess, the most beautiful of the three, gives him a ring as a memento and warns him that, in case he is stranded in the underworld, he can use a white ram to reach the surface (its pair, a black one, will take him deep underground). His brothers pull up the rope with the princess and abandon their younger brother. He jumps on the black ram and is taken further underground. He wanders a bit and arrives at an old woman's house, who informs him of a dragon who demands the sacrifice of the princess in order to release the water sources. He kills the dragon and the king, in gratitude, tells him to go near a tree, where he may finds a way to the surface. The youth sleeps for a bit. After he awakes, he notices a three-headed dragon approaching a nest of eagles. He kills the dragon and the eagles, in gratitude, take him back to the surface. Near the end of the journey, the youth cuts off his hand and part of his leg to feed the eagles. He goes home and finds his two elder brothers fighting over the youngest princess.

==== Hungary ====
20th century Hungarian scholar, Ágnes Kovács found 145 variants of the tale type ATU 301, divided into 6 redactions. One of the Hungarian redactions, classified as 301A I* by Kovács with the name A szalonnafa ("The Bacon Tree"), concerns the nocturnal vigil by the king's three sons on their father's tree, in order to catch a mysterious thief. Ten variants of this type were found in Hungarian sources (as of the 1960s).

==== Malta ====
Maltese linguist George Mifsud Chircop analysed 5 Maltese variants. Four of them he deemed "homogeneous": hero's watch on king's orchard for nocturnal apple thief, rescue of maidens, grateful eagle carries hero back to surface. The fifth tale contains the episode of the white and black rams and of the second or lower underworld.

=== Americas ===
==== Chile ====
In a Chilean folktale collected by Pino-Saavedra, The Three Stolen Princesses, a king and a queen have three daughters, much to the king's chagrin. He consults with a witch, who suggests to transform them into oranges. He does and orders permanent guard duty on the three fruits. Some time later, a giant named Hairy Dog turns into a bird to pluck the oranges, knowing that they were the princesses. The giant succeeds in his first two visits, but on the third attempt, even though he gets the third orange, he is hurt by the guard, Manuel.

== Analysis ==
=== Tale type ===
The tale is classified in the Aarne–Thompson–Uther Index as ATU 301, "The Three Stolen Princesses" (Romanian: Cele trei prințese răpite).

Professor Michael Meraklis cited that the tale type AaTh 301A (Note: It should be noted, however, that the third revision of the Aarne-Thompson classification system, made in 2004 by German folklorist Hans-Jörg Uther, subsumed both subtypes AaTh 301A and AaTh 301B into the new type ATU 301.) shows the "typical beginning" of the dragon stealing the apples from the King's apple tree in the royal garden, and the three princes holding a watch at night for the nocturnal thief. Likewise, French folklorist Paul Delarue established that this was subtype 301A of type AaTh 301 in the French Folktale Catalogue, with the title Les Fruits d'Or ("The Golden Fruits"), wherein a mysterious thief steals the golden fruits from a wonderful tree.

In this regard, the opening of the Romanian tale has been noted to resemble the opening of German tale The Golden Bird (type ATU 550, "Bird, Horse and Princess"). In addition, professor Nai-tung Ting suggested that this introductory episode was a later addition to a simpler form of the narrative.

Researcher Milena Benovska-Sabkova suggested that this "alternative" opening to tale type ATU 301 seems to be a development of the tale in the Balkan regions, since Bulgarian, Greek and Romanian variants show this opening episode. Further studies by professor Joseph Szövérffy indicate that "most of the versions of this type come from Eastern Europe, Asia Minor, and the area surrounding the Mediterranean".

=== Other motifs ===
In regards to the journey on the eagle's back, folklorist scholarship recognizes its similarities with the tale of Etana helping an eagle, a tale type later classified as Aarne–Thompson–Uther ATU 537, "The Eagle as helper: hero carried on the wings of a helpful eagle".

Scholarship has also noted that the "Near Eastern" versions of type 301A contain the episode of the "second underworld". In that regard, literary critic Walter Puchner, in Enzyklopädie des Märchens, noted that type AaTh 301A "frequently combines" with type ATU 300, "The Dragonslayer".

== See also ==
- Jean de l'Ours
- The Nine Peahens and the Golden Apples
- The Greek Princess and the Young Gardener
- The Golden Mermaid
- The Story of Bensurdatu
- The Rider Of Grianaig, And Iain The Soldier's Son
- The Bold Knight, the Apples of Youth, and the Water of Life
- The Blue Mountains
