= Alexander Afanasyev =

Russian folklorist

Alexander Afanasyev Александр Афанасьев
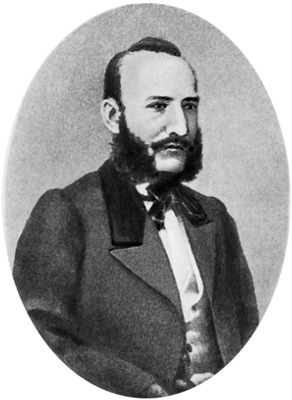
- Born: 23 July 1826; Boguchar, Voronezh Governorate, Russian Empire
- Died: 5 October 1871 (aged 45); Moscow, Russian Empire
- Education: Imperial Moscow University (1848)
- Occupations: Slavist, folklorist, literary critic, historian, journalist
- Writing career
- Notable works: Russian Fairy Tales, Poetic Views of the Slavs on Nature

Alexander Nikolayevich Afanasyev (Note: Also romanised as Afanasief, Afanasiev or Afanas'ev.) (Russian: Александр Николаевич Афанасьев; 23 July [O.S. 11 July] 1826 – 5 October [O.S. 23 September] 1871) was a Russian Slavist and ethnographer, best known for publishing nearly 600 East Slavic and Russian fairy and folk tales, one of the largest collections of folklore in the world. This collection was not restricted to Great Russia, but included folk tales from what are now Ukraine and Belarus as well. The first edition of his collection was published in eight volumes from 1855 to 1867, earning him the reputation of being the Russian counterpart to the Brothers Grimm.

== Life ==
Alexander Afanasyev was born in the town of Boguchar in the Voronezh Governorate of the Russian Empire (modern-day Voronezh Oblast of Russia) into a family of modest means. His mother, Varvara Mikhailovna Afanasyeva, came from common people. Alexander was her seventh child; she became very ill after giving birth and died by the end of the year. The children were raised by their father, Nikolai Ivanovich Afanasyev, who had the rank of titular councillor and served as a prosecutor's assistant on probable causes, and whom Alexander described as a man of high intellectual and moral qualities, 'deservedly known as the smartest person in the whole uyezd'.

In three years, the family moved to Bobrov, Voronezh, where Alexander spent his childhood. He became addicted to reading early in his life, having access to the well-stocked library left by his grandfather (a member of the Russian Bible Society), as well as to various magazines.

In 1837, he was sent to the Voronezh male gymnasium, and in 1844 he entered the Law Faculty of the University of Moscow, which he finished in 1848. There he attended the lectures of Konstantin Kavelin, Timofey Granovsky, Sergey Solovyov, Stepan Shevyryov, Osip Bodyansky, and Fyodor Buslaev. He published a series of articles on government economy during the times of Peter the Great, on the Pskov Judicial Charter, and on other topics in the Sovremennik and Otechestvennye Zapiski magazines. Despite being one of the most promising students, he failed to become a professor. The conservative Minister of National Enlightenment, Count Sergey Uvarov, who oversaw the final exams, attacked Afanasyev's essay, which discussed the role of autocracy in the development of Russian criminal law during the 16th and 17th centuries.

In 1849, Konstantin Kavelin helped him to get a place at the Moscow Main Archive Directorate under the Ministry of Foreign Affairs of the Russian Empire, and here Afanasyev worked for the next 13 years. During that time, he met many people of science and culture, and collected a large number of ancient books and manuscripts that formed a huge library. His articles, reviews, and ethnographical and historical works regularly appeared in the leading Russian magazines, newspapers, almanacs, and scientific periodicals. His essays on Russian satire of the 18th century and on the works of prominent writers and publishers resulted in an 1859 monograph, Russian Satirical Magazines of 1769–1774 (Russian: Русские сатирические журналы 1769–1774 г.), published in Otechestvennye Zapiski (Nos. 3, 4 of 1855; No. 6 of 1859).

In 1855, he headed the state commission responsible for the publication of legislative, historical, and literary works. From 1858 to 1861, he also worked as the main editor of the short-lived magazine Bibliographical Notes, which actually served as a cover for collecting materials, censored and revolutionary literature for the socialist in exile Alexander Herzen. In 1862, the authorities arrested the Narodnik Nikolay Chernyshevsky, while other people associated with Herzen, including Afanasyev, came under suspicion. His flat was searched, and while nothing was revealed, he still lost his place at the Moscow Archives.

After his dismissal, he could not find a stable job for several years and had to sell his library to feed his family. After that, he worked as a secretary at the Moscow City Duma and at the Moscow Congress of Justices of the Peace, while continuing his ethnographical research. He wrote a large theoretical work (three tomes of 700 pages each)—The Poetic Outlook of Slavs about Nature—which came out between 1865 and 1869. In 1870, his Russian Children's Fairy Tales (Russian: Русские детские сказки) were published.

Afanasyev spent his last years living in penury. He died in Moscow aged 45, suffering from tuberculosis. He was buried at the Pyatnitskoye cemetery.

== Work ==
Afanasyev became interested in old Russian and Slav traditions and stories in the 1850s ("folklore" as an area of study did not exist at the time). His early scholarly articles, including – "Ведун и ведьма" ("Wizard and Witch", published in "Комета", 1851); "Языческие предания об острове Буяне" ("Pagan legends of Buyan Island", published in "Временнике общ. ист. и древ. росс." of 1858 No. 9) – drew upon the so-called Mythological school that treated legends and tales as a mine of information for the study of more ancient pagan mythology (see his definitive work on the subject "Поэтические воззрения славян на природу" ("The Poetic Outlook on Nature by the Slavs", 1865–1869). In such an interpretation, he regarded the fairy tale Vasilisa the Beautiful as depicting the conflict between the sunlight (Vasilisa), the storm (her stepmother), and dark clouds (her stepsisters). A great archivist, his works provide copious information, evidence, documents, and passages of the old chronicles relating to Old Russian culture, history and tradition, as well as other Indo-European languages, folklore and legends, in particular German traditions (he knew to perfection German as well as all Slav languages and ancient ones).

In the early 1850s, being already known for his articles, Afanasyev began to think about a collection of folk tales. He was then asked by the Russian Geographical Society (ethnography section) of Saint Petersburg to publish the folktales archives that the Society had been in possession of for about ten years. These archives are at the start of his Collection. Afanasyev chose 74 tales out of these. He added to them the enormous collection of Vladimir Dal (about 1000 texts), from which he kept 148 numbers, finding the other ones too distorted, his own collection (of about 10 folktales from the Voronezh region), and a few other collections. He added already published tales (such as Maria Marievna, The Firebird, The Grey Wolf, etc.), a few tales coming from epic songs, stories about the dead, a few medieval satirical texts (such as The Shemiaka Sentence), and anecdotes.

He owes his prominent place in the history of Slavonic philology chiefly to these Russian Fairy Tales (Народные русские сказки), published between 1855 and 1863, and inspired by the famous collection of the Brothers Grimm. From the scientific point of view, his collection goes further. He had at his disposal a lot of contributors, he tried to give the source and place where the tale was told, he never tried to give any definitive version of a folktale: so, if he gathered seven versions of one folk type, he edited them all (this is the case for The Firebird for instance).

In 1860 a scandal was provoked following the publication of the "Русские народные легенды" ("Russian Folk Legends", 1860), a collection of folk tales from all over the country based on the lives of Jesus and Christian saints. The result was a unique blend of Christianity with paganism and social undertones. Some of them were labeled unorthodox by the Most Holy Synod and the book was officially banned. He also prepared Заветные сказки ("Treasured Tales"), an assortment of redacted tales from "Русские народные легенды" plus other potential controversial stories – published as Russian Forbidden Tales in Switzerland anonymously because of their obscene and anticlerical subject matter.

=== Publications ===
- Afanasyev, Alexander (1851). Ведун и ведьма [Wizard and Witch] (in Russian).
- Afanasyev, Alexander (1858). Языческие предания об острове Буяне [Pagan legends of Buyan Island] (PDF) (in Russian).]
- Afanasyev, Alexander (1865). Поэтические воззрения славян на природу [The Poetic Outlook on Nature by the Slavs] (in Russian). Vol. 1.
- Afanasyev, Alexander (1868). Поэтические воззрения славян на природу [The Poetic Outlook on Nature by the Slavs] (in Russian). Vol. 2.
- Afanasyev, Alexander (1869). Поэтические воззрения славян на природу [The Poetic Outlook on Nature by the Slavs] (in Russian). Vol. 3.
- Afanasyev, Alexander (1859). Народные русские легенды [Traditional Russian Legends] (in Russian)., alt link
- Afanasyev, Alexander (1984) [1873]. Народные русские сказки [Traditional Russian Tales] (in Russian) (2nd ed.)., 3 vols, (first edition 1859)
  - alt links vol. 1, vol. 2, vol. 3

=== Translations ===
- Afanasyev, Alexander (1916), Magnus, Leonard A. (ed.), Russian Folk Tales, 70+ fairy tales, translated by Leonard A. Magnus
- Afanasyev, Alexander (1906), Meyer, Anna (ed.), Russische volksmärchen (in German), Vienna: C. W. Stern, 43 fairy tales
- Afanasyev, Alexander (1976), Russian Fairy Tales, 178 fairy tales + commentary by Roman Jakobson, translated by Norbert Guterman, illustrated by Alexander Alexeieff
- Afanasyev, Alexander (2020), Tales From Russian Folklore, 120 fairy tales, translated by Stephen Pimenoff, cover by Will Dady

== Significance ==
Prior to Afanasyev's works in the 1850s, only a few attempts had ever been made to record or study the folk beliefs of peasant Russia. Though written Church Slavonic had existed since the 10th century, it was used almost solely by the church and only for parochial written works. It was not until the 18th and 19th centuries that a sizable body of secular literature developed in vernacular Russian. Thus, Afanasyev's collections made a highly valuable contribution to the dissemination and legitimization of Russian culture and folk belief. The influence of these folk tales can be seen in the works of many writers and composers, notably Nikolai Rimsky-Korsakov (Sadko, The Snow Maiden) and Igor Stravinsky (The Firebird, Petrushka, and L'Histoire du soldat).

== In popular culture ==
In the 2019 film John Wick: Chapter 3, John Wick visits the New York Public Library and requests "Russian Folk Tale, Aleksandr Afanasyev, 1864."

== See also ==
- Charles Perrault
- Giambattista Basile
