= The Spinning-Woman by the Spring =

Traditional folk tale in Europe and Asia

The Spinning-Woman by the Spring or The Kind and the Unkind Girls is a widespread, traditional folk tale, known throughout Europe and in certain regions of Asia, including Indonesia. The tale is a representative of a folktale motif cataloged as AT 480 in the international Folktale catalog.

== Synopsis ==
Two stepsisters are, one after another, sent out to serve in the house of a witch where they are assigned what appear to be difficult or impossible tasks. For instance, they are tasked to carry water with a sieve.

The kind girl, however, obeys requests from grateful animals and learns from the birds' song that she must line the sieve with clay to complete her task. Other chores they are assigned include washing black wool white, and gathering flowers at midwinter.

As payment for her household work she can choose one of three caskets, an attractive red, a common yellow or an ugly blue casket. Again, she receives advice from the animals and makes the modest choice and becomes richly rewarded.

Even though the unkind girl is also able to understand the animals, she refuses to follow the advice given by the birds and the help offered by other animals.

== Analysis ==
In many variants, the witch-like character that presents the girls with the choice of casket is replaced by personifications of the twelve months of the year. According to scholar Warren E. Roberts, this narrative appears in Southeastern Europe, namely, Italy, Greece, Russia, Poland, Slovakia, Yugoslavia, and Bulgaria.

It has been argued that the donor in these stories shows some connection to an underworld realm, or has an otherworldly description.

According to scholar Andreas Johns, "in many European and East Slavic versions", the girl drops a spindle into a well, which is the entry point to the otherworld.

Godwin and Groenewald mentioned that in African stories, the calabash is the instrument to draw water, while in the European versions, it is a bucket. However, according to Marie Campbell, Warren E. Roberts's study on the tale type indicated that the motif of the bucket in the well is "typically German".

== International distribution ==
The tale type is recorded all over the world: a great number of versions were registered from Scandinavia and Russia, but tales also exist from Southern Europe, Middle East, Africa, North and South America, India, China and Japan.

=== Origins ===
According to scholar Christine Goldberg, Warren E. Roberts, through the historic-geographic method, distinguished two forms of the tale type, one old and one new, and their origin point as the Near East. However, Slovak professor Viera Gaspariková suggested that the tale type AaTh 480 is "relatively recent" and originated in Europe, in a Romance-speaking region.

=== Europe ===
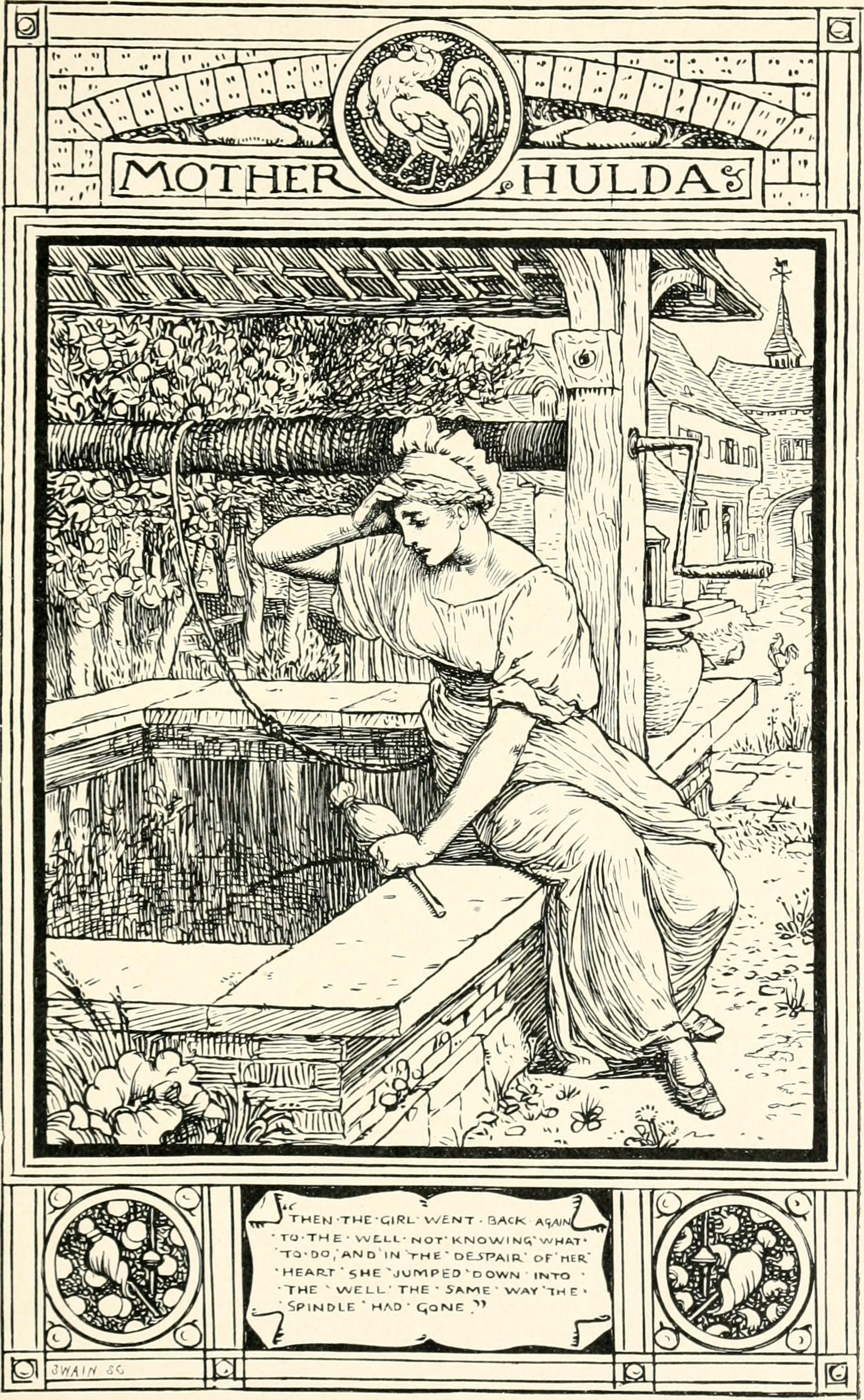
The Kind Girl with her fuse sat by the well. Illustration from Household stories from the collection of the Bros. Grimm (1914).

At least 700 versions have been collected from all over Europe.

Warren E. Roberts and William Bernard McCarthy noted, in Hispanic tradition, the tale type ATU 480 "frequently" led to ATU 510A, "Cinderella". Further scholarship points that this combination also happens in Catalan, French and Portuguese variants.

The tale type is said to be "the most widely collected" type in Estonia, with 234 variants reported.

According to scholar Bronislava Kerbelyte, the tale type is reported to register 363 Lithuanian variants, with and without contamination from other tale types.

=== Middle East ===
Scholar Ulrich Marzolph remarked that the tale type AT 480 was one of "the most frequently encountered tales in Arab oral tradition", albeit missing from The Arabian Nights compilation.

=== Africa ===
The tale type is also "largely known" in Africa, "found all over" the continent. Africanist Sigrid Schmidt claims that this tale type, among others, must belong to a very old and indigenous tradition of the continent. A similar opinion is shared by ethnologist Geneviève Calame-Griaule: according to her, the tale type "seems deeply rooted" in Africa, due to "its frequency and permanence".

According to scholar Denise Paulme, in African tales, the good character meets an old man or old woman on their way to fetch some water, and this mysterious elder asks her to delouse them or to give them food. In addition, the rivalry may occur between female blood siblings (twins or not), stepsisters, and even between co-wives of the male character.

=== Americas ===
The tale type is also said to be "widespread" in U.S. tradition. Folklorist Herbert Halpert, in turn, asserted that in American and English variants of the tale type, two narratives exist: one like The Three Heads of the Well (girl combs three heads at a well), and another he dubbed Long Leather Bag (heroine is kind to objects and animals, finds a leather bag in the witch's chimney).

== In literature ==
A more direct appearance of the choice of casket motif occurs in Japanese folktale The Tongue-Cut Sparrow: a poor old man rescues a sparrow and is presented with the choice between a large casket and a small one; he chooses the small box. This tale is also a variant of the ATU 480 tale type.

=== Shakespeare ===
The same motif is used by William Shakespeare in the play The Merchant of Venice. Act 2, Scene VII where the Prince of Morocco has to solve the riddle and find out what casket hides Portia's portrait.

MOROCCO
The first, of gold, who this inscription bears,
'Who chooseth me shall gain what many men desire;'
The second, silver, which this promise carries,
'Who chooseth me shall get as much as he deserves;'
This third, dull lead, with warning all as blunt,
'Who chooseth me must give and hazard all he hath.'
How shall I know if I do choose the right?

== List of tales ==
- Aurore and Aimée
- Diamonds and Toads
- Father Frost
- Mother Hulda
- The Enchanted Wreath
- The Months
- The Old Witch
- The Three Fairies
- The Three Heads of the Well
- The Three Little Men in the Wood
- The Twelve Months
- The Two Caskets

== See also ==
- The Magic Swan Geese
- The Talking Eggs - It has a similar concept like the stories above.

== Literature ==
- Aarne, Antti; Thompson, Stith. The Types of the Folktale. A Classification and Bibliography. The Finnish Academy of Science and Letters. Folklore Fellows Communications FFC N. 184. Helsinki 1961. pp. 164–167. ISBN 951-41-0132-4.
- Ashliman, D. L. A Guide to Folktales in the English Language: Based on the Aarne-Thompson Classification System. Bibliographies and Indexes in World Literature, vol. 11. Westport, Connecticut: Greenwood Press, 1987. pp. 101–102. ISBN 0-313-25961-5.
- Christiansen, Reidar Th. (1930). "A Norwegian Fairytale in Ireland?". Béaloideas. 2 (3): 235–45. doi:10.2307/20521594. JSTOR 20521594. Accessed 10 May 2021.
- Dimitrova, Delyana (2016). "Conceptual Metaphor in an English and Bulgarian Version of the Tale of the Kind and the Unkind Girls". Balkanistica. 26: 17–60.
- Dosedla, Heinrich (2012). "The Kind and Unkind Papuan Girls: Tumbuna Tales from the Highlands of Papua New Guinea". Fabula. 53 (1–2): 46–63. doi:10.1515/fabula-2012-0003. S2CID 163739787.
- Duggan, Anne E. and Stotter, Ruth. "The Kind and Unkind. Motif Q2". In: Jane Garry and Hasan El-Shamy (eds.). Archetypes and Motifs in Folklore and Literature. A Handbook. Armonk / London: M.E. Sharpe, 2005. pp. 371–377.
- Erik Henning Edvardsen: An Oral Prose Motif from AT 480 used by William Shakespeare in The Merchant of Venice. (Still unpublished).
- Jones, Steven Swann (1986). "Structural and Thematic Applications of the Comparative Method: A Case Study of 'The Kind and Unkind Girls'". Journal of Folklore Research. 23 (2/3): 147–61. JSTOR 3814445.
- Roberts, Warren E. (1958). "The special forms of Aarne-Thompson type 480 and their distribution". Fabula. 1 (1): 85–102. doi:10.1515/fabl.1958.1.1.85. S2CID 164046113.
- Roberts, Warren E. "The Tale of the Kind and the Unkind Girls. Aa-Th 480 and Related Tales". Fabula: Journal of Folktale Studies. Supplement-Serie. B: Untersuchungen Heft 1. Walter de Gruyter & Co. Berlin 1958a.
- El-Shamy, Hasan (2004). Types of the Folktale in the Arab World: A Demographically Oriented Tale-Type Index. Bloomington: Indiana University Press. pp. 248–252 (list of entries).
- Guðmundsdóttir, Aðalheiður (2024). "Þegar eldurinn slokknar: um ævintýri, miðlun og möguleika" [When the Fire Goes Out: On Fairy Tales, Mediation, and Possibilities]. Milli mála (in Icelandic). 16 (1): 58–83. doi:10.33112/millimala.16.1.4. hdl:20.500.11815/5225.
