= The Old Witch =

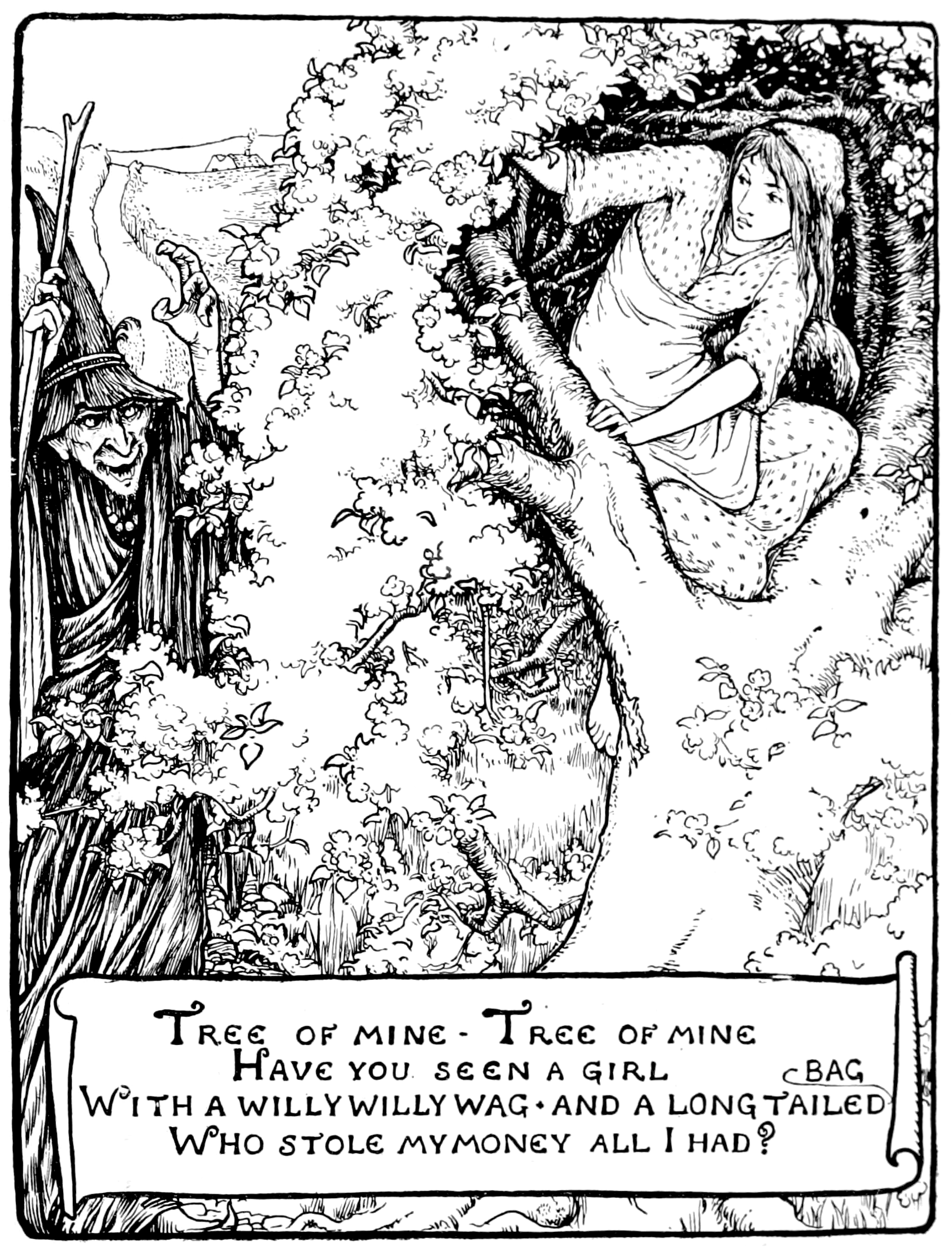
Illustration by John D. Batten featuring the apple tree hiding a girl from the old witch.

The Old Witch is an English fairy tale published by Joseph Jacobs in his 1894 book, More English Fairy Tales. It is also included within A Book of Witches by Ruth Manning-Sanders and A Book of British Fairy Tales by Alan Garner. Neil Watkins has researched the story of ‘The Old Witch’. In "The Watkins Book of English Folktales" PP.55–60 Watkins records that the story was told by a nine-year-old girl called Nora to Ellen Chase in Deptford (now in Greater London) in 1892. Ellen Chase gave her copy of the story to Mrs Gomme, who then sent it to Joseph Jacobs. Watkins notes that “It is at once clear that the Gomme/Jacobs text is a radical revision of the original, rather than a slight brushing-up for publication.” Chase's original notes were published in FLS News (10 1990) as ‘The Witch and her Servant’ and is re-produced in Watkins pp. 58–59.

It is Aarne-Thompson tale 480, the kind and the unkind girls. Others of this type include Frau Holle, Shita-kiri Suzume, Diamonds and Toads, Mother Hulda, Father Frost, The Three Little Men in the Wood, The Enchanted Wreath, The Three Heads in the Well, and The Two Caskets. Literary variants include The Three Fairies and Aurore and Aimée.

== Synopsis ==
Once there was a couple who had two daughters, but their father had no work. The daughters wanted to seek their fortune, and one said she would go into service. Her mother said she could, if she could find a place.

The daughter searched but, unable to find anything, eventually came upon an oven full of bread. The bread begged the girl to take it out and she obeyed. The girl continued and eventually came to a cow that begged her to milk it which she did. She then came to an apple tree that begged her to shake down its apples which she did.

Continuing her search, the girl came upon an old witch's house and the old witch set her to clean the house, but forbade her to ever look up the chimney. One day, she did just that and bags of money fell down. The girl immediately gathered them up and fled.

Realizing what the girl had done, the old witch chased her. Each time the old witch came close to grabbing her, the apple tree and the cow hid her. When the girl came to the oven, it hid her behind it and tricked the old witch into entering, trapping her for a long time. The girl used her obtained bag of money to marry a wealthy man.

Her sister decided to try the same thing, but instead she refused to help the oven, the cow, and the apple tree. When she stole the gold, the apple tree refused to hide her and the old witch caught her, beat her, and took back the bag of money.

== See also ==
- Frau Holle
- The Magic Swan Geese
- The Little Girl Sold with the Pears
- The King of Love
- Kallo and the Goblins
- The Months (fairy tale)
