= Kallo and the Goblins =

Greek fairy tale

Kallo and the Goblins is a Greek fairy tale. Fani Papalouka, Nikolaos Politis, and Haris Sakellariou collected variants of the story.

== Synopsis ==
A fat woman had an ugly older daughter, Marbo, and a beautiful younger daughter, Kallo. People admired Kallo and pitied Marbo; Marbo resented it and made Kallo do all the work. One day, the mother asked for one of them to go to the mill to grind flour; Marbo insisted on sending Kallo. Kallo got there, many people were grinding, and her grain was poured in just before the miller went to bed; she had to wait. At midnight, goblins came out and threatened to eat her. Kallo said they could not eat her in her old dress; she needed a new dress. When they stole a fine dress for her, she said she needed other things, a coat, an umbrella, a comb, face powder, and anything she could think of. Then dawn came, and the goblins had to leave. The miller ground her grain, and Kallo went back with what the goblins had given her and the flour.

Marbo envied her and wasted the flour. On New Year's Day, more was needed, and Marbo went for it. When the goblins came, they scratched her face, and she screamed for help; the miller saved her, but she gained nothing. Kallo used the goblins' face powder on her and healed her face.

== Commentary ==
The goblins of the title, the Kallikantzaros, live beneath the ground, trying to chop up the tree that holds up the earth. When it is nearly down, they know it is Christmas and come up to make mischief; they are driven back down at Epiphany, when the Greek Orthodox priests bless the waters.

== See also ==
- Diamonds and Toads
- Father Frost (fairy tale)
- Mother Hulda
- The Old Witch
- The Three Heads in the Well
