= Shita-kiri Suzume =

Traditional Japanese fable

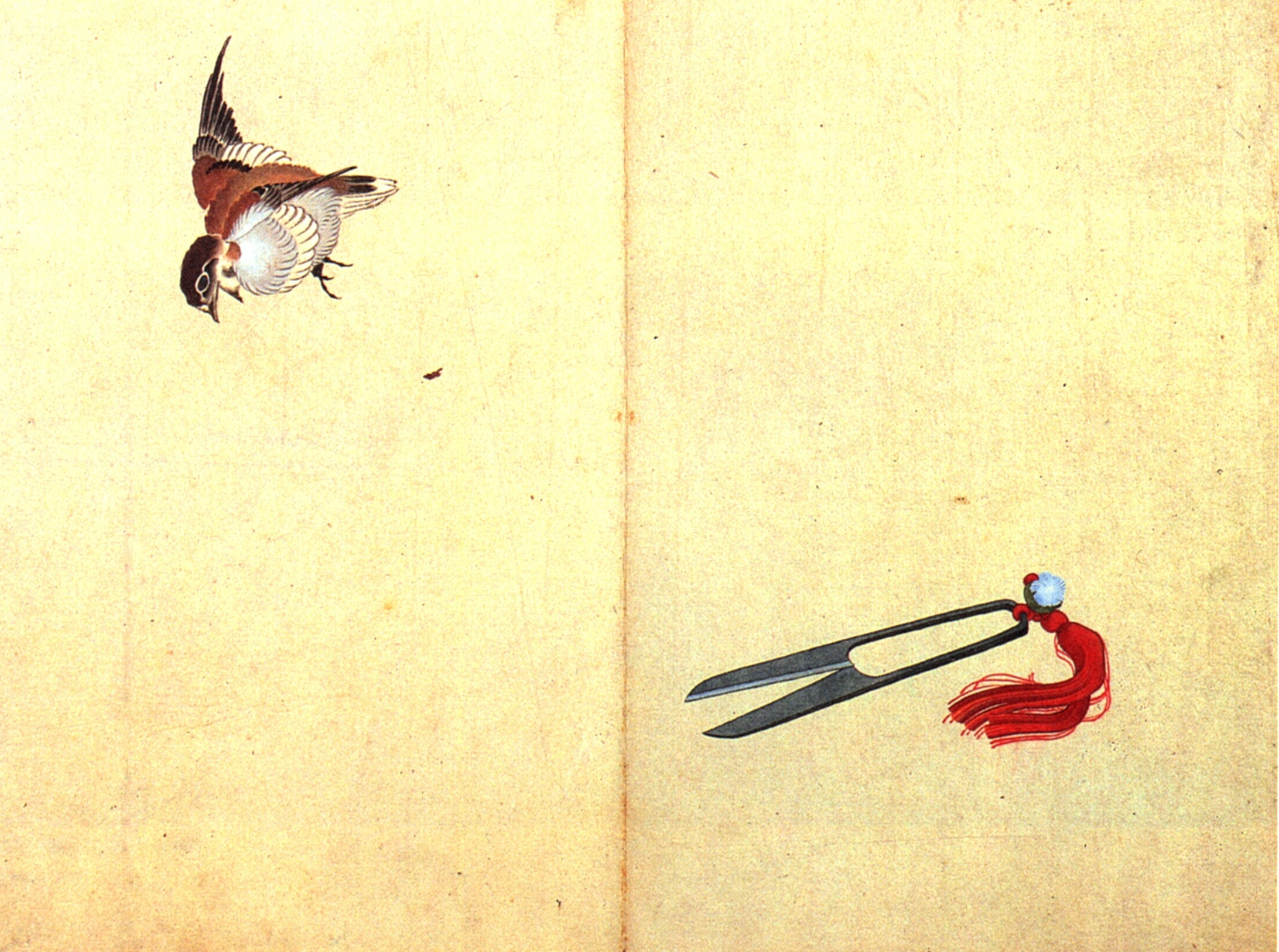
- Katsushika Hokusai ukiyo-e

Folk tale
- Name: Shita-kiri Suzume
- Country: Japan

Shita-kiri Suzume (舌切り雀, shita-kiri suzume), translated literally into "Tongue-Cut Sparrow", is a traditional Japanese fable telling of a kind old man, his avaricious wife and an injured sparrow. The story explores the effects of greed, friendship and jealousy on the characters.

Andrew Lang included it as The Sparrow with the Slit Tongue in The Pink Fairy Book.

The basic form of the tale is common throughout the world.

== Plot ==
Once upon a time there lived a poor old woodcutter with his wife, who earned their living by cutting wood and fishing. The old man was honest and kind but his wife was arrogant and greedy. One morning, the old man went into the mountains to cut timber and saw an injured sparrow crying out for help. Feeling sorry for the bird, the man took it back to his home and fed it some rice to try to help it recover. His wife, being very greedy and rude, was annoyed that he would waste precious food on such a small and insignificant little thing as a sparrow. The old man, however, continued caring for the bird.

The man had to return to the mountains one day and left the bird in the care of the old woman, who had no intention of feeding it. After her husband left, she went out fishing. While she was gone, the sparrow got into some starch that was left out and eventually ate all of it. The old woman was so angry upon her return that she cut out the bird's tongue and sent it flying back into the mountains from where it came.

The old man went searching for the bird and, with the help of other sparrows, found his way into a bamboo grove in which the sparrow's inn was located. A multitude of sparrows greeted him and led him to his friend, the little sparrow he saved. The others brought him food and sang and danced for him.

Upon his departure, they presented him with a choice of a large basket or a small basket as a present. Being an older man, he chose the small basket as he supposed it would be the least heavy. When he arrived home, he opened the basket and discovered a large amount of treasure inside. The wife, learning of the existence of a larger basket, ran to the sparrow's inn in the hope of getting more treasure for herself. She chose the larger basket but was warned not to open it before getting home.

Such was her greed that the wife could not resist opening the basket before she returned to the house. To her surprise, the box was full of deadly snakes and other monsters. They startled her so much that she tumbled all the way down the mountain, presumably to her death.

=== Moral ===
- The purity of friendship overcomes the evil of greed and jealousy.
- Greed only leads to one's own demise.

== Variants ==
The tale is classified as Aarne–Thompson type 480, "The Kind and the Unkind Girls." Others of this type include Diamonds and Toads, Mother Hulda, The Three Heads of the Well, Father Frost, The Three Little Men in the Wood, The Enchanted Wreath, The Old Witch and The Two Caskets. Literary variants include The Three Fairies and Aurore and Aimée.

According to professor Hiroko Ikeda's Index of Japanese Folktales, the tale is classified as type 480D, "The Tongue-Cut Sparrow" or Shita-kiri Suzume.

== Translations ==
The story has been translated into English many times, by A. B. Mitford (1871), William Elliot Griffis (1880), David Thomson (as volume 2 of Hasegawa Takejirō's Japanese Fairy Tale Series, 1885), Yei Theodora Ozaki (1903), Teresa Peirce Williston (1904), and many others.

== See also ==
- The Fountain of Youth
- The Goose that Laid the Golden Eggs
