= Diel Breull =

Diel Breull (died 1632) was a German who was executed for witchcraft in Hesse in Germany.

He was exiled from Hesse in 1629 for having used a crystal ball to perform magic, and when he violated the banishment by returning the following year, he was arrested. He claimed that after the death of his family in 1622, he had awoken in the mountain of Venus, where the goddess Holda, "Fraw Holt", had shown him the dead in both Heaven and Hell in a mirror and informed him that he was a "night traveler". He had since then visited the Venus Mountain four times annually to be given a rich harvest.

Diel Breull was tortured until he adjusted his story to say that the Venus Mountain was in fact a Witches' Sabbath where he had sworn himself to Satan. He was then convicted and executed for sorcery in 1632.
