= The Months =

The Months may refer to

- The Months, an instructive poem by Sara Coleridge
- The Months (fairy tale), one of the stories in the Pentamerone
- The Months, a set of landscape paintings by Pieter Bruegel the Elder

== See also ==
- The Month, a Jesuit magazine
