= The Enchanted Wreath =

Scandinavian fairy tale

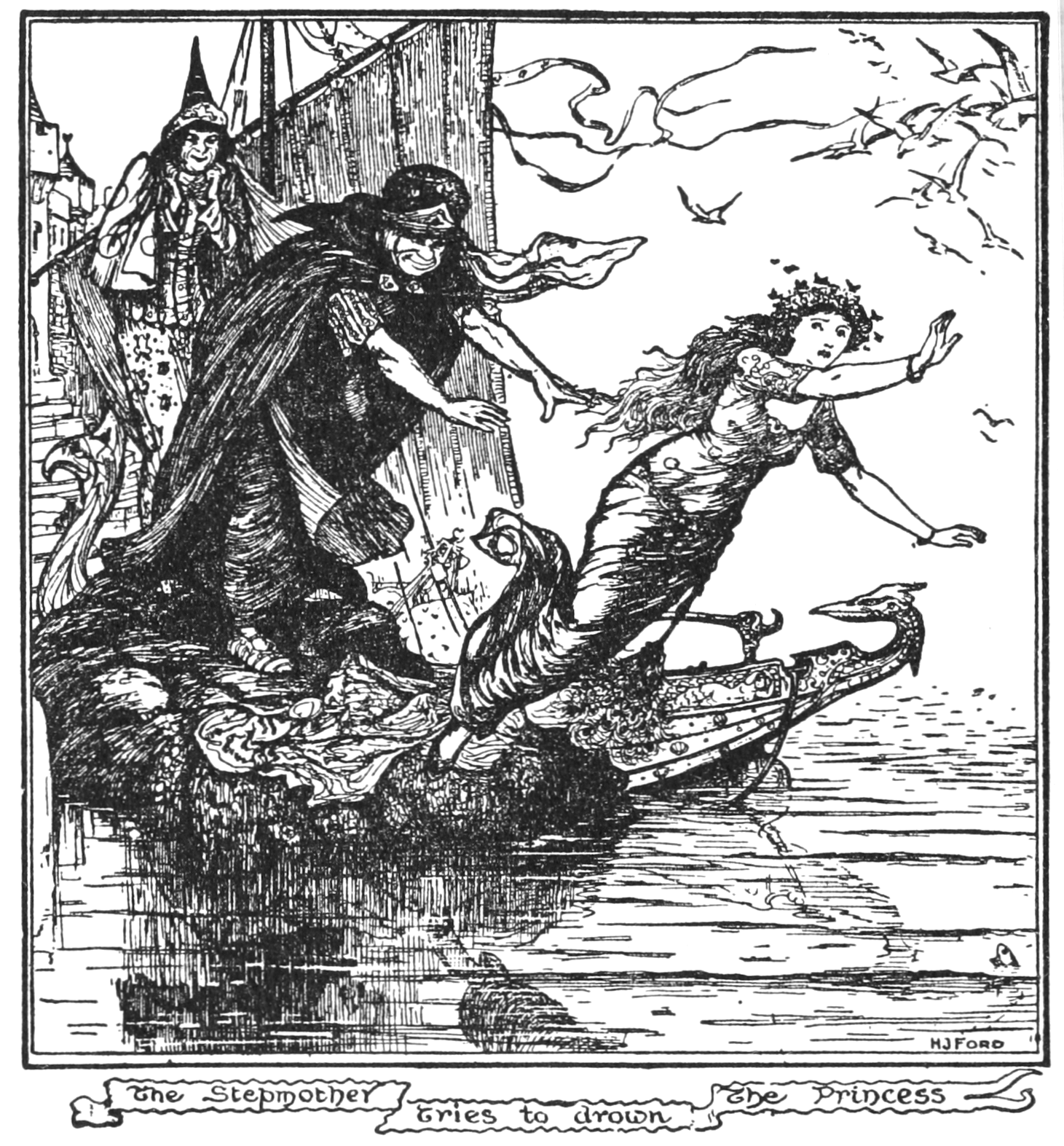
Illustration for The Orange Fairy Book

The Enchanted Wreath is a Scandinavian fairy tale, collected in Benjamin Thorpe in his Yule-Tide Stories: A Collection of Scandinavian and North German Popular Tales and Traditions. Andrew Lang adapted a variant of it for The Orange Fairy Book.

It is classified in the international Aarne-Thompson index as ATU 480, "The Kind and the Unkind Girls", and segues into type 403B, "The Black and The White Bride", in that the heroine is replaced by a female relative in order to trick her husband.

== Sources ==
The tale was originally published by Swedish folktale collectors George Stephens and Gunnar Olof Hyltén-Cavallius with the German title Der Kranz, later translated to Swedish as Kransen ("Wreath"). Benjamin Thorpe published the tale with the title The Wreath, and sourced from South Småland.

== Synopsis ==
A man had a wife, and both of them had a daughter from an earlier marriage. One day, the man took his daughter to cut wood and found when he returned that he had left his axe. He told his wife to send her daughter for it, so it would not grow rusty. The stepmother said that his daughter was already wet and, besides, was a strong girl who could take a little wet and cold.

The girl found three doves perched on the axe, looking miserable. She told them to fly back home, where it would be warmer, but first gave them crumbs from her bread. She took the axe and left. Eating the crumbs made the birds feel much better, and they lay on her head an unfading wreath of roses, with tiny birds singing in it. The stepmother pulled it off, and the birds flew off and the roses withered.

The next day, the father went alone and left his axe again. The stepmother was delighted and sent her own daughter. She found the doves and ordered them off as "dirty creatures." They cursed her to never be able to say anything except "dirty creatures." The stepmother beat her stepdaughter, and was all the angrier when the doves restored the wreath to its condition and the girl's head.

One day, a king's son saw her and took her off to marry her. The news of them made the stepmother and her daughter quite ill, but they recovered when the stepmother made a plan. She had a witch make a mask of her stepdaughter's face. Then she visited her, threw her into the water, and put her daughter in her place, before setting out to see if the same witch could give her something to cure the doves' curse on her daughter. Her husband was distraught by the change in her, but thought it stemmed from an illness. He thought he saw his bride in the water, but she vanished. After twice more seeing her, he was able to catch her. She turned into various animals, a hare, a fish, a bird, and a snake, but he cut off the snake's head, and the bride became a human again.

The stepmother returned with an ointment that would work only if the true bride had really been drowned; she put it on her daughter's tongue and found it did not work. The prince found them and said they deserved to die, but the stepdaughter had persuaded him to merely abandon them on a desert island.

== Commentary ==
This tale contains two sequences, which are often found together – "The Three Little Men in the Wood", "The White Bride and the Black One", "Maiden Bright-eye", and "Bushy Bride" – but which can also be two separate stories. First, there is the "kind and unkind girls" tale, where variants include "Mother Hulda", "Diamonds and Toads", "The Three Heads in the Well", "The Two Caskets", and "Father Frost". Literary variants include "The Three Fairies" and "Aurore and Aimée". Second, the theme of the stepmother (or another woman) managing to usurp the true bride's place after the marriage, is often found in other fairy tales, where the obstacles to the marriage differ, if they were part of the tale: "The Wonderful Birch", "Brother and Sister", "The Witch in the Stone Boat", or "The White Duck".
