= The Twelve Months (fairy tale) =

Czech fairy tale

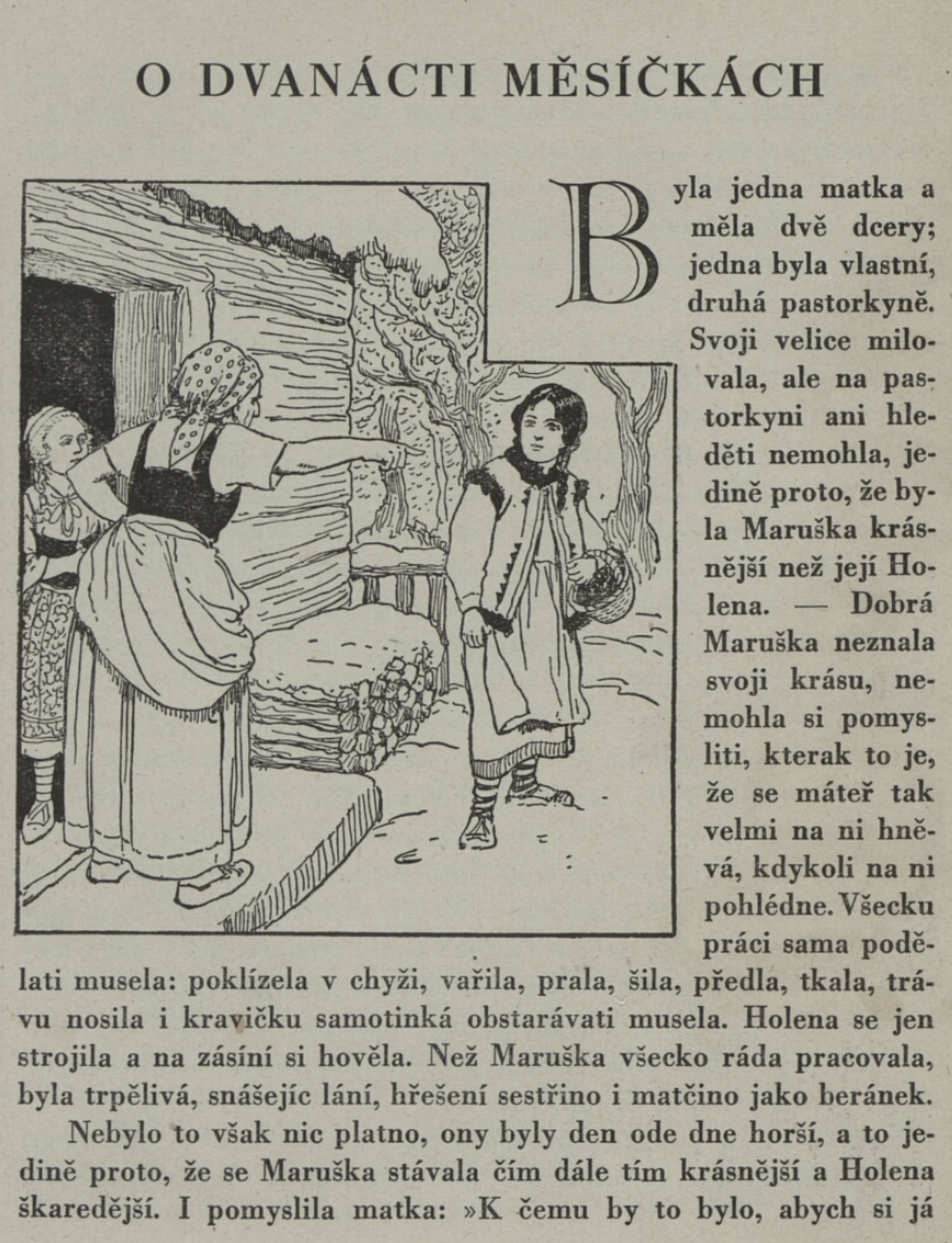

"The Twelve Months" is a Czech fairy tale, which was first mentioned by a Czech writer, scholar, physician, lexicographer, canon of the St. Vitus Cathedral in Prague and a master of the University of Prague in the 14th century - mistr Klaret/Bartoloměj z Chlumce, who mentions the fairy tale as a preaching exemplum.

It was later collected by one of the most famous Czech writers - Božena Němcová. The Russian variant is Father Frost and both are Aarne–Thompson type 480, The Kind and the Unkind Girls.

== Synopsis ==
A young and beautiful girl (called Maruška in some variations) is sent into the cold forest in the winter to perform impossible tasks by her evil stepmother. She must get spring violets, summer strawberries and fall apples in midwinter as presents to give her stepsister for her birthday. The girl ventures out into the blizzard cold and eventually meets the 12 personified months by a warm fire in the woods. When she approaches and asks politely if she can warm her hands at their fire, they ask why she is here, and when she tells them about her step-family and what she is looking for, the spirits help her. The child spirit of March creates the violets, youthful June the strawberries, and grown September the apples, at the direction of the elderly January. The stepmother and sister takes their items, without a word of thanks. When the evil stepsister comes to search for the twelve months herself in the snow, hoping for gifts of her own, the spirits disappear, taking their fire, and leaving the stepsister cold and hungry, searching for eternity. The same fate lay in store for the wicked stepmother. She too let greed run away with her and to this day she still searches in an unfriendly forest for the path back to her home. The kind sister remained in her house, and lived happily ever after.

== Analysis ==
=== Tale type ===
The tale is classified in the international Aarne-Thompson-Uther Index as type ATU 480, "The Kind and Unkind Girls". According to scholar Warren Roberts, tale type ATU 480 with the Twelve Months form a cycle of tales that appear in Southeastern Europe, namely, Italy, Greece, Russia, Poland, Slovakia, Yugoslavia, and Bulgaria.

=== Motifs ===
The characters of the personified Twelve Months appear in tale types ATU 510A, "Cinderella", and type ATU 480, "The Spinning-Woman by the Spring" (also known as "The Kind and the Unkind Girls").

== Legacy ==
Some literary critics claim that the fairy tale was later adapted as a theater play by a Russian writer, Samuil Marshak in 1943, and subsequently in the Soviet cinematography. Marshak objected this claiming that he heard a narration of a Bohemian legend. He also pointed out the composition is considerably different from that of Nemtsova's.

The Russian adaptations of the Slovak folk fairy tale are often mistaken for the original, they often vary from the original, mainly by adding new characters (like the young girl of the Russian nobility, a Russian soldier, etc.)

Some adaptations originated from other adaptations, e.g. the Japanese Twelve Months (1980 film).

=== List of adaptations ===
- The twelve months by Božena Němcová
- The Twelve Months (1956 film)
- The Twelve Months (1972 film)
- Twelve Months (1980 film)
- The Twelve Months (2012 film)

== See also ==
- The Months
