= Fabula (journal) =

- Discipline: Folklore studies
- Language: English, French, German

Publication details
- History: 1958–present
- Publisher: De Gruyter
- Frequency: Biannual

Standard abbreviations
- ISO 4: Fabula

Indexing
- ISSN: 0014-6242 (print); 1613-0464 (web)

Links
- Journal homepage

Fabula (from lat. fabula: "story, fable") is a multilingual academic journal on comparative folklore studies with a focus on European narratives (such as fairy tales, sagas, and fables). It publishes essays, reviews, and conference reports in German, English, and French. Its subtitle is: Zeitschrift für Erzählforschung. Journal of Folktale Studies. Revue d'Etudes sur le Conte Populaire.

Since 1958, the journal has been published bi-annually by De Gruyter and is available in both print and online-editions. It was established by the German scholar Kurt Ranke and is currently edited by Brigitte Bönisch-Brednich, Simone Stiefbold, and Harm-Peer Zimmermann. It is closely connected to the multi-volume work Enzyklopädie des Märchens (Encyclopedia of Fairy Tales) and is an official journal of the International Society for Folk Narrative Research. From 1959 till 1970 the Supplement-Serie A, Texte was published.

== Abstracting and indexing ==
The journal is abstracted and indexed in:

- EBSCO databases
- Scopus
- ERIH PLUS
- MLA International Bibliography
- Scopus
- Arts & Humanities Citation Index
- Current Contents/Arts & Humanities
