= Frau Holle =

German legendary creature and fairy tale

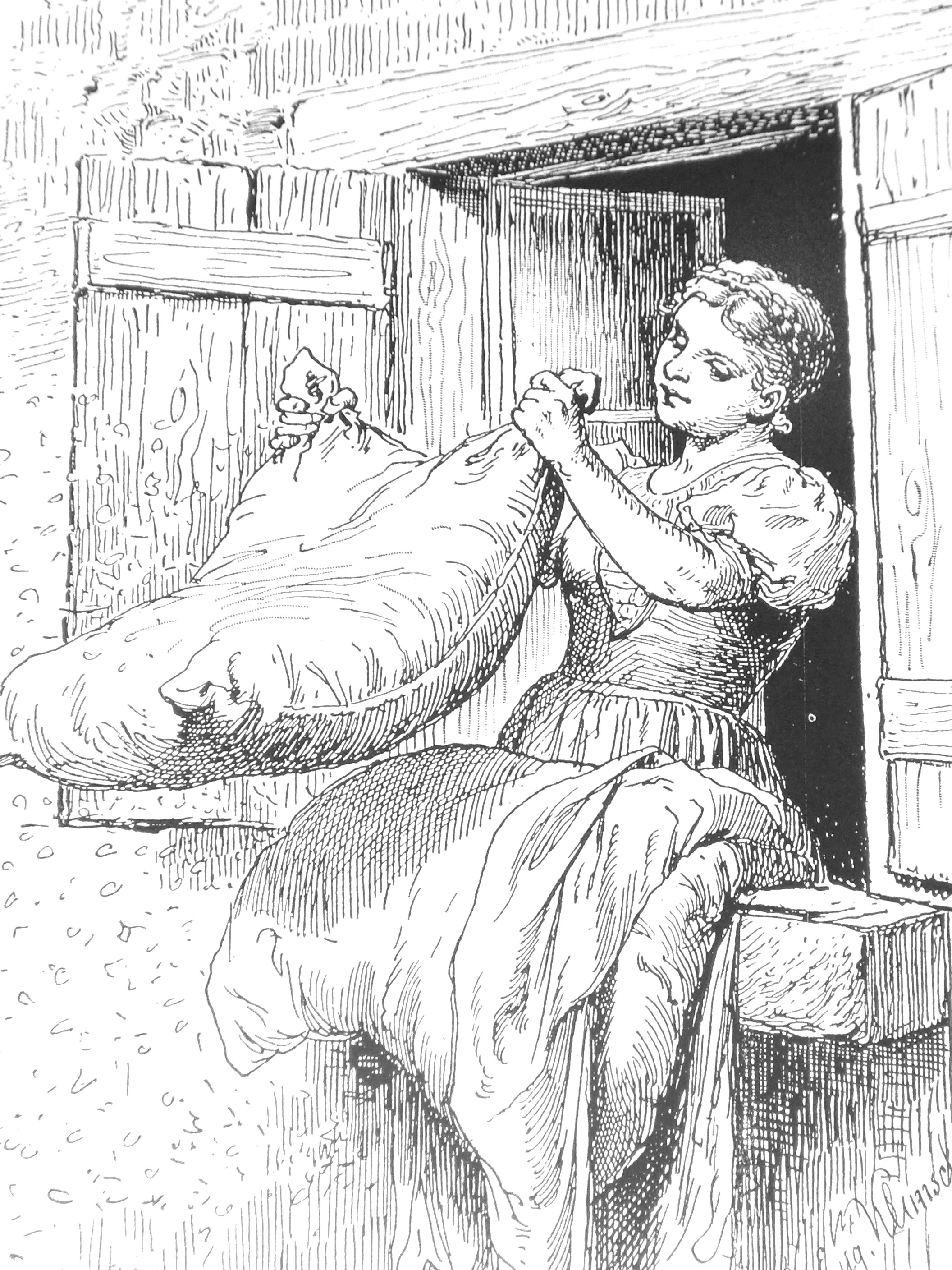
- Goldmarie from "Frau Holle", illustration by Hermann Vogel

Folk tale
- Name: Frau Holle
- Aarne–Thompson grouping: ATU 480
- Country: Germany
- Published in: Grimm's Fairy Tales

"Frau Holle" (/ˈfraʊ ˈhɒl/; German: [fʁaʊ ˈhɔlə]; also known as "Mother Holle", "Mother Hulda" or "Old Mother Frost") is a German fairy tale collected by the Brothers Grimm in Children's and Household Tales in 1812 (KHM 24). It is of Aarne-Thompson type 480.

Frau Holle (also known in various regions as Holla, Holda, Perchta, Berchta, Berta, or Bertha) was a folk figure whom the Grimms claimed survived in popular belief well into the 19th century. The figure originated as an ancient pre-Christian Germanic and Scandinavian goddess of winter, domestic crafts, and the underworld before being preserved in European folklore and published as a fairy tale by the Brothers Grimm in 1812.

The name may be cognate of the Scandinavian creature known as the Hulder. Jacob Grimm made an attempt to establish her as a Germanic goddess.

== Legendary creature ==
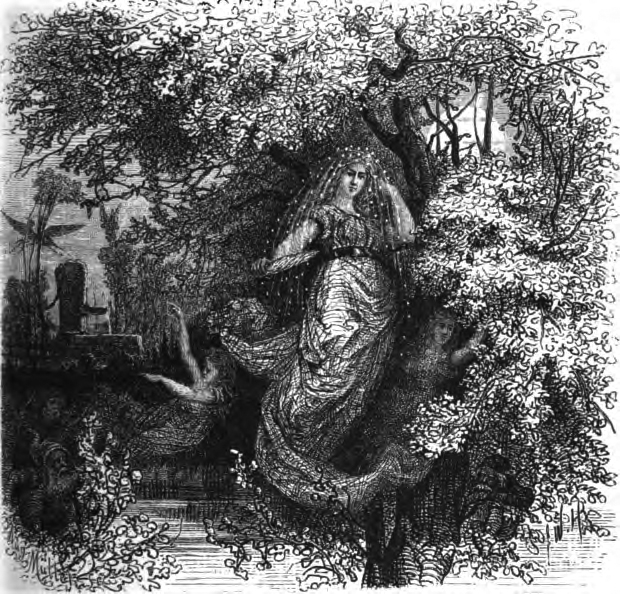
"Holda, the good protectress" (1882) by Friedrich Wilhelm Heine

=== Etymology ===
The name is thought to originate from German huld ("gracious, friendly, sympathetic, grateful" found in hold sein, huldigen), Middle High German hulde, Old High German huldī ("friendliness"). Cognate with Danish and Swedish huld ("fair, kindly, gracious") or 'hyld' ("secret, hidden"), Icelandic hollur ("faithful, dedicated, loyal"), Middle English hold, holde, Old English hold ("gracious, friendly, kind, favorable, true, faithful, loyal, devout, acceptable, pleasant"), from Proto-Germanic hulþaz ("favourable, gracious, loyal"), from Proto-Indo-European *kel- ("to tend, incline, bend, tip").

The name Hludana is found in five Latin inscriptions: three from the lower Rhine (Corpus Inscriptionum Latinarum XIII 8611, 8723, 8661), one from Münstereifel (CIL XIII, 7944) and one from Beetgum, Frisia (CIL XIII, 8830) all dating from 197 AD-235 AD. Many attempts have been made to interpret this name.

=== Origins and attestations ===
In Germanic folklore, Hulda, Holda, Holle, and Holla were all names to denote a single being. Hulda is also related to the Germanic figure of Perchta. She dwells at the bottom of a well, rides a wagon, and first taught the craft of making linen from flax. According to Erika Timm, Perchta emerged from an amalgamation of Germanic and pre-Germanic, traditions of the Alpine regions after the Migration Period in the Early Middle Ages.

Holda's connection to the spirit world through the magic of spinning and weaving has associated her with witchcraft in Catholic, German folklore. She was considered to ride with witches on distaffs, which closely resemble the brooms that witches are thought to ride. Likewise, Holda was often identified with Diana in old church documents. As early as the beginning of the 11th century, she appears to have been known as the leader of women, and of female nocturnal spirits, which "in common parlance are called Hulden from Holda". These women would leave their houses in spirit, going "out through closed doors in the silence of the night, leaving their sleeping husbands behind". They would travel vast distances through the sky, to great feasts, or to battles amongst the clouds. (Note: From the Canon Episcopi, quoted by Ginzburg (1990, p. 94))

The 9th-century Canon Episcopi censures women who claim to have ridden with a "crowd of demons". Burchard's later recension of the same text expands on this in a section titled "De arte magica":

Have you believed there is some female, whom the stupid vulgar call Holda [in manuscript Cod. Vat. 4772, strigam Holdam, the witch Holda], who is able to do a certain thing, such that those deceived by the devil affirm themselves by necessity and by command to be required to do, that is, with a crowd of demons transformed into the likeness of women, on fixed nights to be required to ride upon certain beasts, and to themselves be numbered in their company? If you have performed participation in this unbelief, you are required to do penance for one year on designated fast-days.

Later canonical and church documents make her synonymous with Diana, Herodias, Bertha, Richella, and Abundia. Carlo Ginzburg has identified similar beliefs existing throughout Europe for over 1,000 years, whereby men and women were thought to leave their bodies in spirit and follow a goddess variously called Holda, Diana, Herodias, Signora Oriente, Richella, Arada, and Perchta. He also identifies strong morphological similarities with the earlier goddesses Hecate / Artemis, Artio, the Matres of Engyon, the Matronae, and Epona, as well as figures from fairy-tales, such as Cinderella.

A 16th-century fable recorded by Erasmus Alberus speaks of "an army of women" with sickles in hand sent by Frau Hulda. Thomas Reinesius in the 17th century speaks of Werra of the Voigtland and her "crowd of maenads."

Here cometh up Dame Hulde with the snout, to wit, nature, and goeth about to gainstay her God and give him the lie, hangeth her old ragfair about her, the straw-harness; then falls to work and scrapes it featly on her fiddle. — M. Luther (1522)

Grimm based his theory of Holda on what he took to be the earliest references to her: An 11th-century interpolation to the Canon Episcopi by Burchard of Worms, and pre-Christian Roman inscriptions to Hludana that he tentatively linked to the same divinity. There were early challenges to connecting this figure with a pagan goddess, since her earliest definite appearance links her with the Virgin Mary, commonly called the "Queen of Heaven": An early-13th-century text listing superstitions states that "In the night of Christ's Nativity they set the table for the Queen of Heaven, whom the people call Frau Holda, that she might help them". Lotte Motz and Ginzburg both conclude that she is pre-Christian in origin, based on comparison with other remarkably similar figures and ritual observances spread throughout Europe.

A pagan Holda received wide distribution in catalogs of superstitions and in sermons during the 15th century, and in the 16th, Martin Luther employed the image to personify the shortcomings of hostile Reason in theological contexts.

=== Variants ===
==== Frau Gauden ====
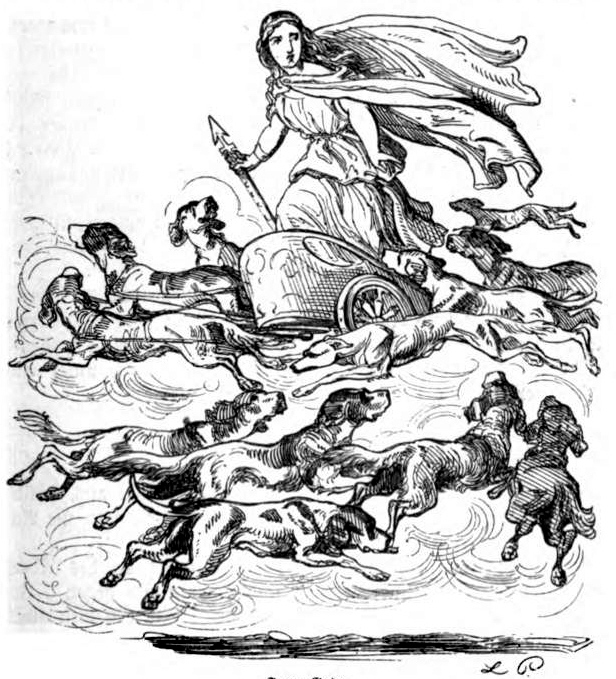
Frau Gode and her dogs

Frau Gauden, also known as Frau Gode, Frau Gaur, Fru Goden, Frau Wohl, and Mutter Gauerken, is a being from the folklore of Mecklenburg. She is said to be cursed because she expressed to prefer eternally hunt rather than go to Heaven, and her daughters, who expressed the same desire, were transformed into small dogs who either pull her wagon or sled, or serve as hunting dogs. She visits the homes of humans during the Twelve Nights of Christmas and punishes the lazy while sometimes rewarding the virtuous or those who help her.

==== Perchta ====
The Grimms say Perchta or Berchta was known "precisely in those Upper German regions where Holda leaves off, in Swabia, in Alsace, in Switzerland, in Bavaria and Austria." According to Jacob Grimm (1882), Perchta was spoken of in Old High German in the 10th century as Frau Berchta and thought to be a white-robed female spirit. She was known as a goddess who oversaw spinning and weaving, like myths of Holda in Continental German regions. He believes she was the feminine equivalent of Berchtold, and she was sometimes the leader of the wild hunt.

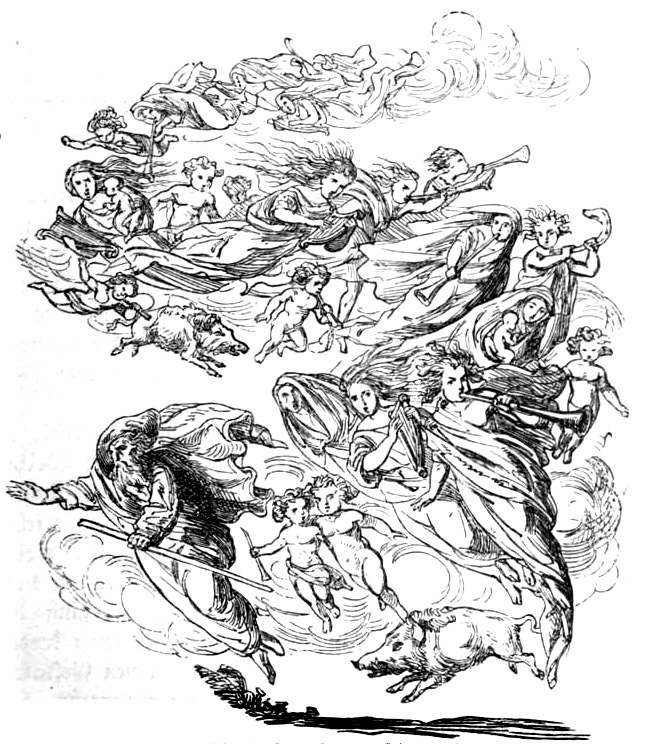
Frau Holle, or Perchta, with the Wild Hunt

According to Erika Timm, Perchta emerged from an amalgamation of Germanic and pre-Germanic, probably Celtic, traditions of the Alpine regions after the Migration Period in the Early Middle Ages.

==== Spillaholle ====
The Spillaholle (Silesian German also Spillahulle, Spillahole, Spillahôle, Spiellahole; Standard German: Spindelholle; English translation: "spindle Holle") is a legendary creature exclusively found in German folklore of formerly German Silesia including Austrian Silesia. A similar being is found in folktales of formerly German-speaking Bohemia. The Spillaholle is a Silesian variant of female German legendary creatures such as Hulda (Frau Holle) or Perchta. In Bohemia, she is simply known as Frau Holle ("Mrs. Holle"). Other Silesian names are Satzemsuse, Mickadrulle, and Mickatrulle.

The Spindelholle is a sallow old woman with short arms and legs, sometimes directly called a hag. She appears hooded (characterized by the name Popelhole or Popelhôle; Standard German: Popelholle; English translation: "hooded Holle") or wearing ragged clothing (as shown by the name variant Zumpeldrulle or Zompeldroll). She also can be seen in old Franconian dress or generally shaped as a pelt sleeve. The Bohemian Frau Holle is a small and ugly old woman who carries a bunch of stinging nettles.

The main activity of the Spillaholle is connected with spinning, for she is the overseer of spinning taboos and a bogey used for spinning children. Therefore, a broad variety of names for the Spillaholle shows connection to spindles, such as Spilladrulle, Spillagritte, Spillmarthe, Spillalutsche or Spellalutsche.

The appearance of the Spillaholle is mainly during the winter months, especially during Advent, Christmas or during the Zwölften (twelve nights of Christmas). She goes from house to house to see if the children and spinsters are spinning diligently, looking through the windows or even all gaps in the house wall. When they are still spinning during evening and night, then there will be slight or even severe punishments.

When spinsters are not finished with their spinning, then the Satzemsuse will sit in their lap during spinning or even give them fiery spindles instead of normal ones. The Spillaholle takes the lazy spinsters away. Frau Holle beats them with a batch of stinging nettles. If all the tow is already spun, then not only will there be no punishment, but also one of Holle's apotropaic nettles left behind to banish misfortune from the house for the whole of the coming year. Additionally, in Bohemia all spinning is banned on the night of St. Thomas. If a spinster is working anyway, she will be punished by Frau Holle.

To children spinning in the night the Spindelholle says: "Verzage nicht, verzage nicht, warum spinnst du die Zahl am Tage nicht?" (Do not quail, do not quail, why do you not spin the number at day?) Then she kills the children or takes them away. That this will not happen the children will be warned by their parents when at evening the wind is howling in the stove: "Die Spillagritte kommt!" (The Spillagritte comes!), or they will have to listen to the following rhyme:

Silesian German	Standard German	English
Spennt, Kendala, spennt,	Spinnt, Kinderlein, spinnt,	Spin, little children, spin,
De Spellalutsche kemmt;	Die Spillalutsche kommt;	The Spillalutsche comes;
Se guckt zu olla Löchlan rei,	Sie guckt zu allen Löchlein rein,	She peeks through all the little gaps,
Ebs Strânla watt bâle fertig sein.	Ob das Strähnlein wird bald fertig sein.	If the little strand will be finished soon.

The Spillaholle also scares people to death or walks abroad at forest tracks. A less malicious activity of her is the causation of snow, just like it is known from the standard Frau Holle as well. When the Spillaholle shakes her bed, then it will snow.

The Spindelholle's home lies beneath a rock in the woods, known as the Spillalutschenstein ("Spillalutsche's stone"). At night, seven lights can be seen above the Spillalutschenstein. Normally, the Spillaholle appears solitarily, but as Popelhole, she is wed to the Popelmann, a German Silesian Bogeyman. As Satzemsuse she has companions which are the Satzemkater (Kater = tomcat), the Satzemziege (Ziege = goat) and the Rilpen, a band of wood sprites. The Bohemian Frau Holle is accompanied by small deformed wights whom she orders to beat lazy and slovenly spinsters with rods.

== Fairy tale ==
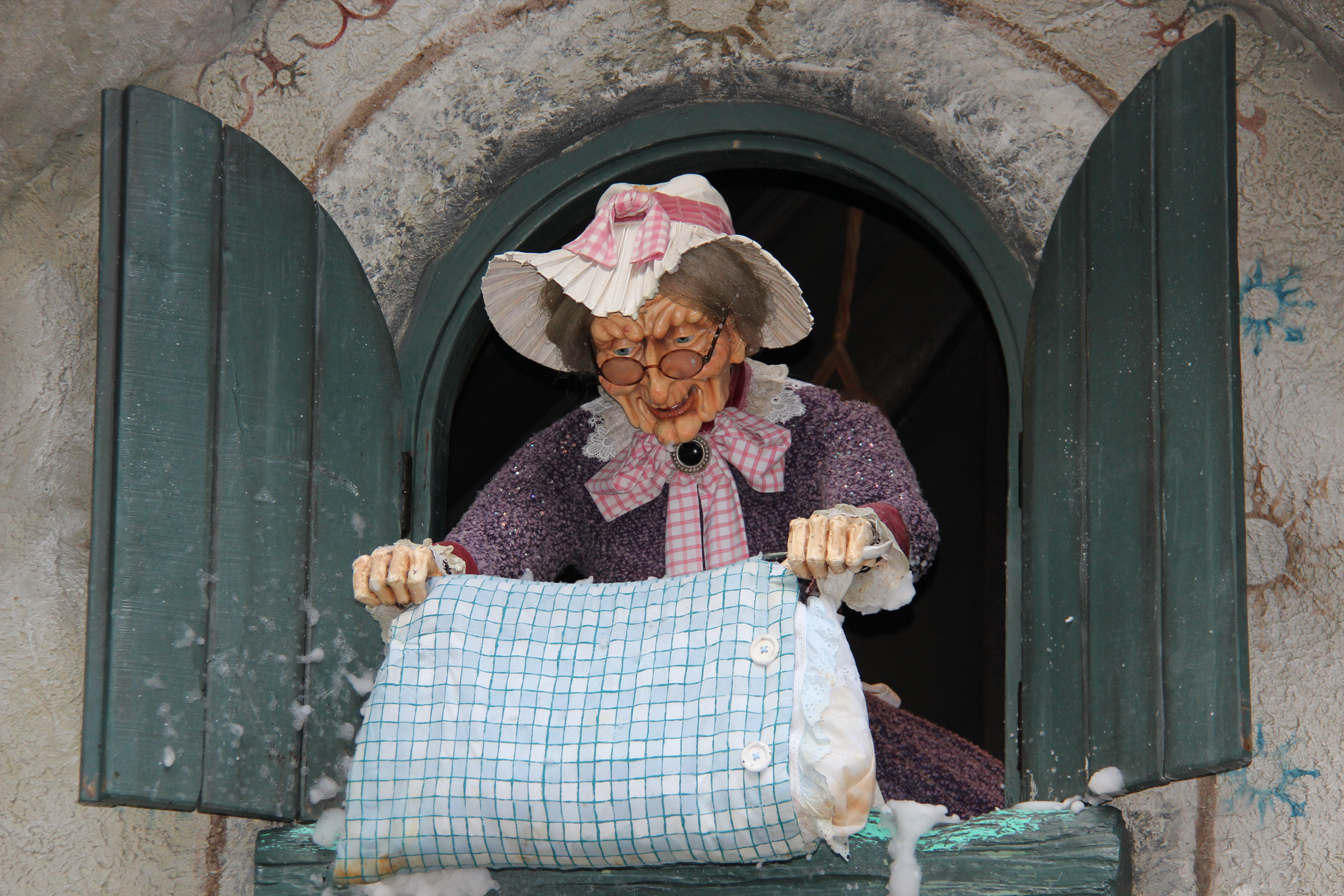
Frau Holle in the Efteling

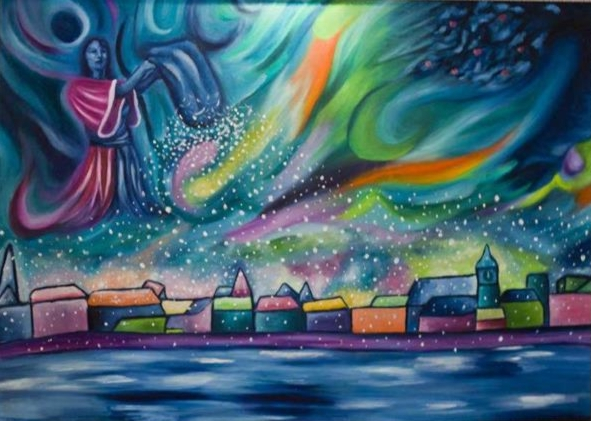
Frau Holle

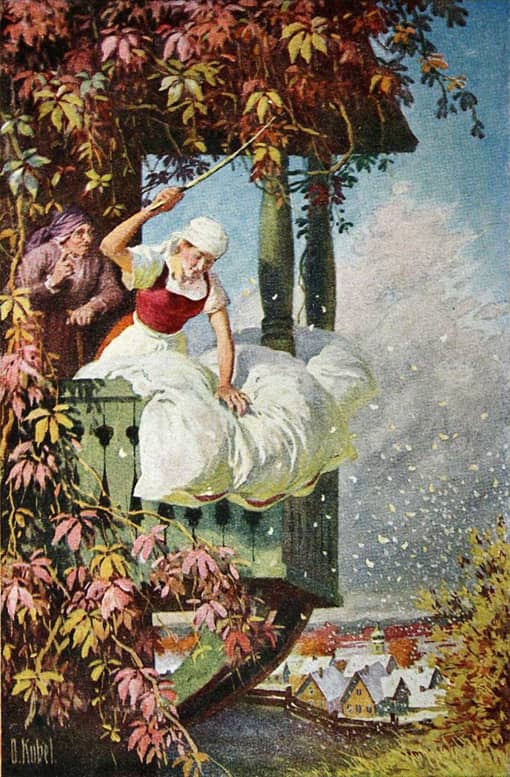
Illustration of Mother Holle by Otto Kubel

=== Background ===
The tale was published by the Brothers Grimm in the first edition of Kinder- und Hausmärchen, published in 1812. Their source was Wilhelm Grimm's friend and future wife Dortchen Wild. Some details were added in the second edition (1819), most notably rooster's greetings, based upon the account of Georg August Friedrich Goldmann from Hanover.

It is still a common expression in Hesse, Southern parts of the Netherlands and beyond to say "Hulda is making her bed" when it is snowing, that is, she shakes her bed and out comes snow from heaven. Like many other tales collected by the Brothers Grimm, the story of Frau Holle was told to teach a moral. In this case, it is that hard work is rewarded and laziness is punished.

=== Summary ===
1812 Edition

In the 1812 original edition of Frau Holle, both the diligent and lazy girls are biological sisters, the latter of whom is favoured by their mother. Fetching a bucket of water is the chore that leads to both sisters falling down the well.

In the 1857 revision, the lazy girl and her mother were retconned as the protagonist's stepsister and stepmother, spinning replaced the fetching of water, and a rooster was added to announce the two stepsisters' arrival home from Frau Holle's world.

1857 Edition

A rich widow has one lazy daughter, whom she spoils, and a kind, hardworking stepdaughter, whom she forces to do all the housework. Every day, the stepdaughter sits outside the cottage and spins beside the well.

One day, the diligent girl is spinning when she pricks her finger on the spindle. As she leans over the well to wash the blood away, the spindle falls from her hand and sinks out of sight. The girl runs to her stepmother, who orders her to fetch the spindle. Terrified, the girl jumps in the well.

The girl finds herself in a beautiful meadow. She comes upon an oven full of bread. The loaves of bread ask to be taken out before they burn. With a baker's peel, she takes all the bread out and walks on. Then she comes to an apple tree that asks for its fruit to be harvested. The girl does so by shaking the tree and gathering the apples into a pile before continuing on her way. Finally, she comes to a small house of an old woman with big teeth which frighten the girl. However, the old woman, whose name is Frau Holle, offers the girl food and shelter in exchange for one task: every day, the girl must shake the featherbed pillows and coverlet when she makes Frau Holle's bed; whenever the feathers fly out, snow covers the girl's world. The girl agrees to work for Frau Holle, and always shakes the old woman's featherbed to bring out the snowflakes.

After a time, the girl becomes homesick and tells Frau Holle that she wants to return home. Frau Holle has been impressed by the girl's kindness and hard work so much that, when she escorts the girl to a gate, a shower of gold falls upon the girl. Frau Holle also gives the girl the spindle which had fallen into the well. Frau Holle closes the gate and the girl finds herself back home, and a rooster crows to announce her arrival.

Wishing for the same good fortune for her own daughter, the widow orders her to sit and spin by the well. But the lazy girl instead pricks herself with a thorn to bleed onto the spindle before tossing it into the well and jumping after it. Like her stepsister, the lazy girl also comes to the oven and the tree, but neither takes out the bread nor harvests the apples. When she comes to Frau Holle's house, she works hard on the first day, but soon becomes lazy again, preventing the snow from falling. Frau Holle soon dismisses the lazy girl. As the lazy girl stands at the gate, a kettle of pitch spills over her and Frau Holle gives her the spindle before shutting the gate.

The lazy girl finds herself home, the rooster announcing her arrival; as punishment for her laziness, the pitch never comes off for the rest of her life.

Other versions describe the first girl having a piece of gold fall from her lips every time she speaks, whilst the second has a toad fall from her lips every time she speaks, as depicted in Diamonds and Toads.

=== Analysis ===
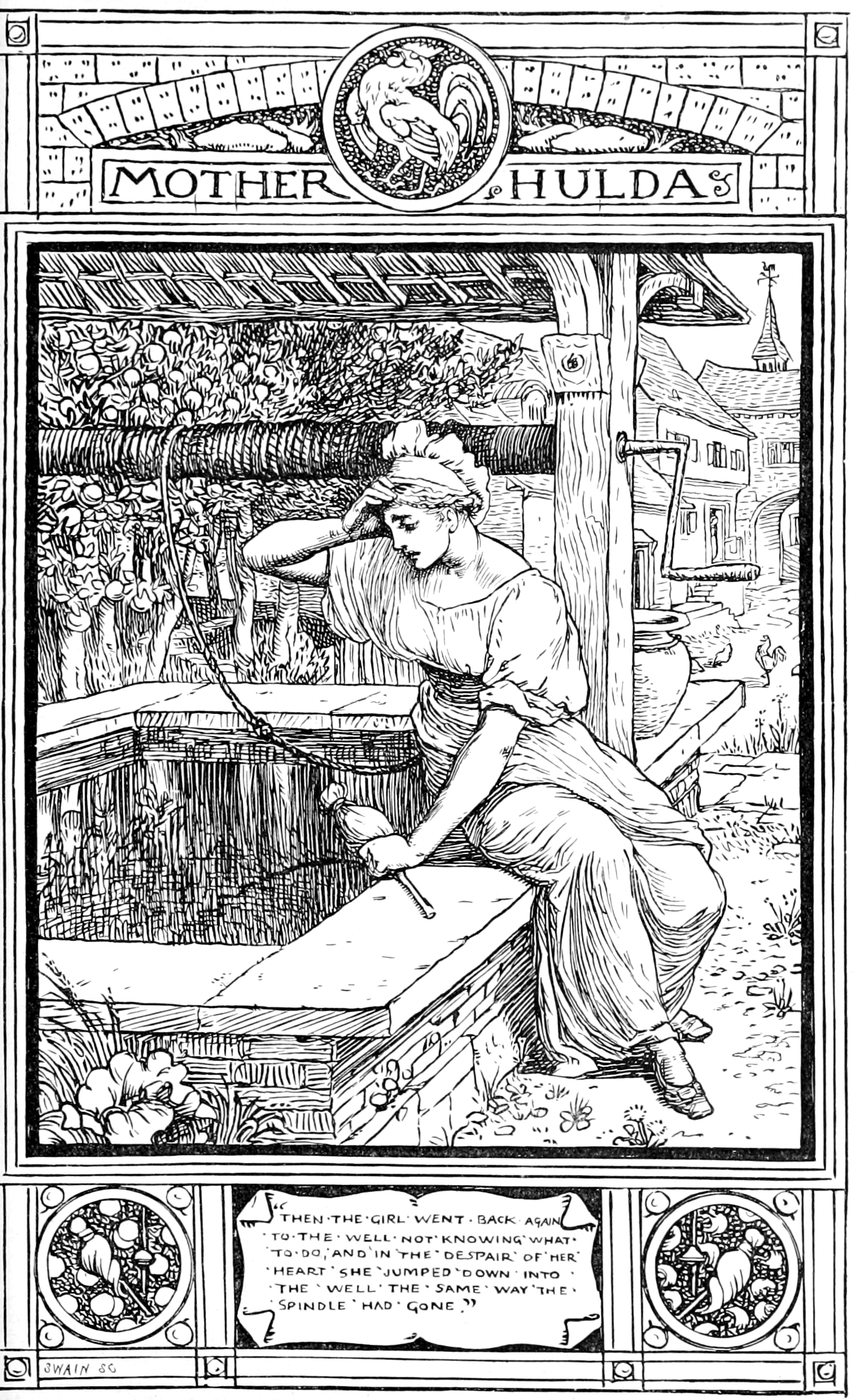
Illustration by Walter Crane, 1882

Like many of the other tales collected by the Grimm brothers, "Frau Holle" personifies good behavior and bad, and the appropriate reward meted out for each. Even so, it also exhibits a number of contrasts with other stories. Typically, the magical beings who appear in the tales must enter the real world and appear to the protagonists before any intercession can take place. Moreover, these beings are almost always anonymous and therefore difficult to correlate with figures in pre-Christian mythology. By contrast, Frau Holle resides somewhere above the Earth, and the protagonists must go to her, paradoxically by diving into a spring. When she makes her bed, loose feathers are 'stirred up' and fall to earth as snow, and so this fairy tale is an origin myth as well. Comparison between Frau Holle and a weather or earth goddess is inevitable. Jakob Grimm notes that Thunar (Thor) makes rain in a similar fashion, implying for Frau Holle a very high rank in the pantheon.

Though not unique in this respect, the Frau Holle story is also notable for the absence of class-related motifs, such as palaces, halls to which one may or may not be invited, and the rise to the status of the nobility through marriage.

According to the Aarne and Thompson classification system of fairy tales, Mother Hulda is a story of type 480, The Kind and the Unkind Girls. Others of this type include Shita-kiri Suzume, Diamonds and Toads, The Three Heads in the Well, Father Frost, The Three Little Men in the Wood, The Enchanted Wreath, The Old Witch, and The Two Caskets. Literary variants include The Three Fairies and Aurore and Aimée.

=== Adaptations ===
Film

- Mother Holly (1906), Germany
- Frau Holle (1953), East Germany
- Mother Holly (1954), West Germany
- Mother Holly (1961), West Germany
- Mother Holly (1963), East Germany
- Once Upon a Time (1973), West Germany
- The Feather Fairy (1985), Czechoslovakia
- Mother Holle (1988), Japan
- Frau Holle (2008), Germany
- Mother Holle (2010), Ireland
- Gretel & Hansel (2020)

Television

- Grimm's Fairy Tale Classics (1988), Japan

Comics and Graphic Novels

- The Lost Sunday by Ileana Surducan (2025), United States

== See also ==
- Grandmother Winter, a children's story based on Frau Holle
- Kallo and the Goblins
- The Months
- The Three Spinners, a similar fairy tale, also collected by the Brothers Grimm
- True and Untrue
- Diamonds and Toads
- Father Frost

== Literature ==
- Hartman, Jennifer (2021). Frau Holle (Old Mother Frost); From the English version Old Mother Frost (2020); Available online by Pagan Kids Publishing. ISBN 978-1-77730-671-7)
- Grimm, Jacob (1835). Deutsche Mythologie (German Mythology); From English released version Grimm's Teutonic Mythology (1888); Available online by Northvegr 2004–2007. Chapter 13:4 Holda, Holle. Dead link
- Marzell: Spillaholle. In: Hanns Bächtold-Stäubli, Eduard Hoffmann-Krayer: Handwörterbuch des Deutschen Aberglaubens: Band 8 Silber-Vulkan. Berlin 1937. (reprint: Walter de Gruyter, Berlin/New York 2000, ISBN 978-3-11-016860-0)
- Peuckert, Will-Erich, ed. (1924). Schlesische Sagen [Silesian legends]. Deutscher Sagenschatz Herausgegeben [German treasure trove of legends] (in German). Vol. 10. Jena: Eugen Diederichs. (reprint: Eugen Diederichs Verlag, Munich 1993, ISBN 3-424-00986-5)
- Richard Kühnau: Sagen aus Schlesien. Berlin 1914. (reprint: Salzwasser Verlag, Paderborn 2011, ISBN 978-3-8460-0190-5)
- Josef Virgil Grohmann: Sagen-Buch von Böhmen und Mähren. Prague 1863. (reprint: Holzinger, Berlin 2013, ISBN 978-1-4849-7919-8)
- Richard Beitl: Untersuchungen zur Mythologie des Kindes: herausgegeben von Bernd Rieken und Michael Simon. Partially approved: Berlin, university, habilitation treatise R. Beitl, 1933, Waxmann Verlag, Münster/New York/Munich/Berlin 2007, ISBN 978-3-8309-1809-7.
