= Erika Timm =

German linguist

Erika Timm (born 1934) is a German linguist, the author of works that have made fundamental contributions to Yiddish historical linguistics and philology.

== Biography ==
In 1985 she wrote her habilitation work in Trier University (Department of Germanistics, section of Yiddish studies). Currently she is a Professor Emeritus of Trier University. She was the first German scholar to be appointed to a chair of Yiddish studies. Her husband, Gustav Adolf Beckmann, a German philologist who specialized in Romance languages, was her collaborator on a number of books.

Studies written by Erika Timm mainly deal with phonetic, semantic and morphological aspects of Old Yiddish, comparison between Western and Eastern Yiddish and the relationship between Yiddish and German dialects. Her most important contribution to the domain, the book ‘Historische jiddische Semantik,’ on which she worked for about twenty years (published in 2005), focuses on the Yiddish translations of the Bible compiled between about 1400 and 1750. Timm demonstrates how the practice of translating the Bible in Jewish elementary schools (kheyder) during the earliest period of the emergence of the Yiddish language influenced the formation of its Germanic Component, that the influence of Judeo-French in this context is more important than thought, and that an important part of the original translation vocabulary is present in everyday Modern Eastern Yiddish.

Erika Timm is also the scholarly editor of a number of Old Yiddish books and the author of several studies in the domain of German philology.

A Festschrift in her honor, Jiddische Philologie, was published in 1999 by de Gruyter.

== Main works ==
- Beria und Simra. Eine jiddische Erzählung des 16. Jahrhunderts, Literaturwissenschaftliches Jahrbuch 14 (1973), pp. 1–94.
- Graphische und phonische Struktur des Westjiddischen unter besonderer Berücksichtigung der Zeit um 1600 (Hermaea 52). Tübingen: Niemeyer, 1987.
- Yiddish Literature in a Franconian Genizah. A Contribution to the Printing and Social History of the Seventeenth and Eighteenth Centuries. With the assistance of Hermann Süss, Jerusalem: Akademon Press, 1988.
- Paris un Wiene, Ein jiddischer Stanzenroman des 16. Jahrhunderts von (oder aus dem Umkreis von) Elia Levita. Eingeleitet, in Transkription herausgegeben und kommentiert von Erika Timm unter Mitarbeit von Gustav Adolf Beckmann, Tübingen: Max Niemeyer Verlag, 1996.
- Matronymika im aschkenasischen Kulturbereich. Ein Beitrag zur Mentalitäts- und Sozialgeschichte der europäischen Juden. Tübingen: Niemeyer, 1999.
- Frau Holle, Frau Percht und verwandte Gestalten. 160 Jahre nach Jacob Grimm aus germanistischer Sicht betrachtet. Stuttgart: Hirzel, 2003.
- Yiddish in Italia. Manoscritti e libri a stampa in yiddish dei secoli XV-XVII / Yidish in Italye. Yiddish Manuscripts and Printed Books from the 15th to the 17th Century. With Chava Turniansky, Milano: Associazione Italiana degli Amici dell'Università di Gerusalemme, 2003.
- Historische jiddische Semantik. Die Bibelübersetzungssprache als Faktor der Auseinanderentwicklung des jiddischen und des deutschen Wortschatzes. Tübingen: Niemeyer, 2005.
- Etymologische Studien zum Jiddischen. Zugleich ein Beitrag zur Problematik der jiddischen Südost- und Ostflanke (co-author: Gustav Adolf Beckmann). Hamburg: Buske, 2006.
