= Brigitte Bönisch-Brednich =

German anthropologist

Brigitte Bönisch-Brednich is a Professor of Anthropology at the Victoria University of Wellington, New Zealand, and Head of School of Social and Cultural Studies.

== Education ==
Born in Northeim (Germany), studied Cultural Anthropology, Art History, Archaeology and History of Science at the University of Göttingen 1982–1987, graduated with a M.A. 1987 and got her PhD in 1994 from the University of Marburg with a scholarship by the Immanuel-Kant-Foundation. She was awarded her Dr. phil. habil. in 2000 for a project on German migration to New Zealand. She has worked on independent research projects and lectured at universities in Germany, Switzerland, Austria and New Zealand. Her current position is as Professor of Cultural Anthropology at Victoria University of Wellington, New Zealand. Her main fields of teaching and research are theory and methodology of cultural anthropology, narratology, visual anthropology, material culture, rituals, political anthropology, tourism, migration and emigration. She is working on a project on academic migration in Australia, New Zealand and continental Europe.

== Selected books/monographs ==
- Local Lives: Migration and the politics of place (with C. Trundle, 2010) Quoted in Higher Education Policy 27 (2014) p. 491.
- Watching the Kiwi. How anthropologists look at New Zealand (2008)
- Keeping a low profile: An oral history of German immigration to New Zealand (2002). Quoted in Emotion, Space and Society 5 (2012) p. 158.
- Auswandern - Destination Neuseeland. Eine ethnographische Migrationsstudie (2002, ^{2}2005) A. Lehmann has based a chapter of his 'Reden über Erfahrung' (2007) pp. 192–197 on her book.
- Volkskundliche Forschung in Schlesien. Eine Wissenschaftsgeschichte (1994)
- "Volkskunde ist Nachricht von jedem Teil des Volkes". Festgabe zum 100. Geburtstag von Will-Erich Peuckert (1996)
- Gebrauchskeramik der Fünfziger Jahre. Ästhetische Norm und industrielle Produktion (1987)
