= Maiden Bright-eye =

Danish fairy tale

Maiden Bright-eye (Danish: Jomfru Klarøje) is a Danish fairy tale, that Andrew Lang included it in The Pink Fairy Book. It is ATU 403 The White Bride and the Black Bride.

== Source ==
Danish folklorist Evald Tang Kristensen was the one who originally collected the tale and published it in 1881. Kristensen cites two informants for this tale, the wife of Nils Uglsøs, a crofter and part-time teacher, and Kristen Møller.

== Synopsis ==
A man has a son and a daughter, the latter of whom is known as Maiden Bright-eye. His wife dies and he marries another woman, who has a daughter of her own, uglier than the man's daughter, which is why the stepmother is cruel to her Bright-eye, forcing her to do the household's chores. One day, the stepmother sends her to watch the sheep while pulling heather from the field, giving her stepdaughter pancakes with flour that has been mixed with ashes as her only food.

Maiden Bright-eye pulls up some heather and a little fellow wearing a red cap pops up from the ground to ask why she is pulling off the roof of his house. After apologizing and explaining her situation, Maiden Bright-eye offers to share her pancakes. The little fellow accepts them, and for the girl's kindness, he gives her three magical gifts: to grow even more beautiful, that a gold coin will fall from her mouth whenever she opens it, and her voice sounds like music; and finally that she will have a young king for a husband. He also gives her a magical cap that she must put it on whenever she's in danger.

When she comes back home Maiden Bright-eye has become so beautiful already that her stepmother can barely recognize her, and when her stepmother asks her how has she become so pretty, the girl tells her about meeting the little man, but not the part about sharing her food. Wanting her own daughter to become as beautiful as her stepdaughter, the stepmother sends her to mind the sheep and pull heather. The stepsister acts rudely to the little man, refusing to share her food when he asks her to, hitting him instead with a stick her mother gave her. Because of this behaviour the little man curses her with becoming even uglier than she already is each day, that a toad to fall and a bull's bellow to come out from her mouth when she opens it, and that she will suffer a violent death. When the stepsister comes home and her mother asks her why he has become so ugly, a toad falls from her mouth.

Meanwhile, the son leaves home and enters the king's service. After visiting his family after the incident with the little fellow with the red cap, when he comes back to the palace he can't stop talking about how beautiful his sister has become. The king, hearing the tales about Maiden Bright-eye's beauty, asks the brother if these stories are true and has them confirmed. The king decides to marry her and sends the brother in a ship to fetch her. The stepmother gives her daughter a mask to cover her hideous face and sends her off on the ship with her stepchildren. While the ship is still sailing, the stepsister pushes Maiden Bright-eye overboard and then pretends to be her for the king, who marries her, but when sees her unmasked, ugly face, he's so enraged that he orders that Maiden Bright-eye's brother must thrown into a pit of snakes for lying to him about his sister's beauty. Fortunately, Maiden Bright-eye survived because she put on the cap the little fellow gave her and it transformed her into a duck, allowing her to swim.

Maiden Bright-eye arrives as a duck to the king's castle, where she manages to waddle up the drain to the kitchen, and meets a little dog. She asks the animal about her brother and stepsister, and the dog tells her their fates; she then says she will only come twice more. Serving maids hear the talking duck, and tell others. The next night, a great number come to listen. The duck asks her questions again, says she will come only once more, and escapes. The third night, a cook puts a net outside the drain and catches the duck, and after noticing she has many gold feathers, they take good care of her.

Meanwhile the brother, who has miraculously survived inside the snake pit, has dreams about his sister coming to the castle as a duck and changing back if someone cuts her beak. He tells the sentinel watching the pit, and word gets back to the king, who asks him if he could produce his real sister, the beautiful one. He says he can if someone brings him a knife and the golden-feathered duck. When they do, he cuts the duck's beak, and after hearing a voice complaining that he had cut her little finger, Maiden Bright-eye regains her own form.

The stepsister is put in a barrel with spikes all around it, and dragged off by six wild horses, dying the violent death the little fellow told her, while the king marries Maiden Bright-eye and the brother becomes prime minister.

== See also ==
- Bushy Bride
- The Three Little Men in the Wood
