= The White Duck =

Russian fairy tale

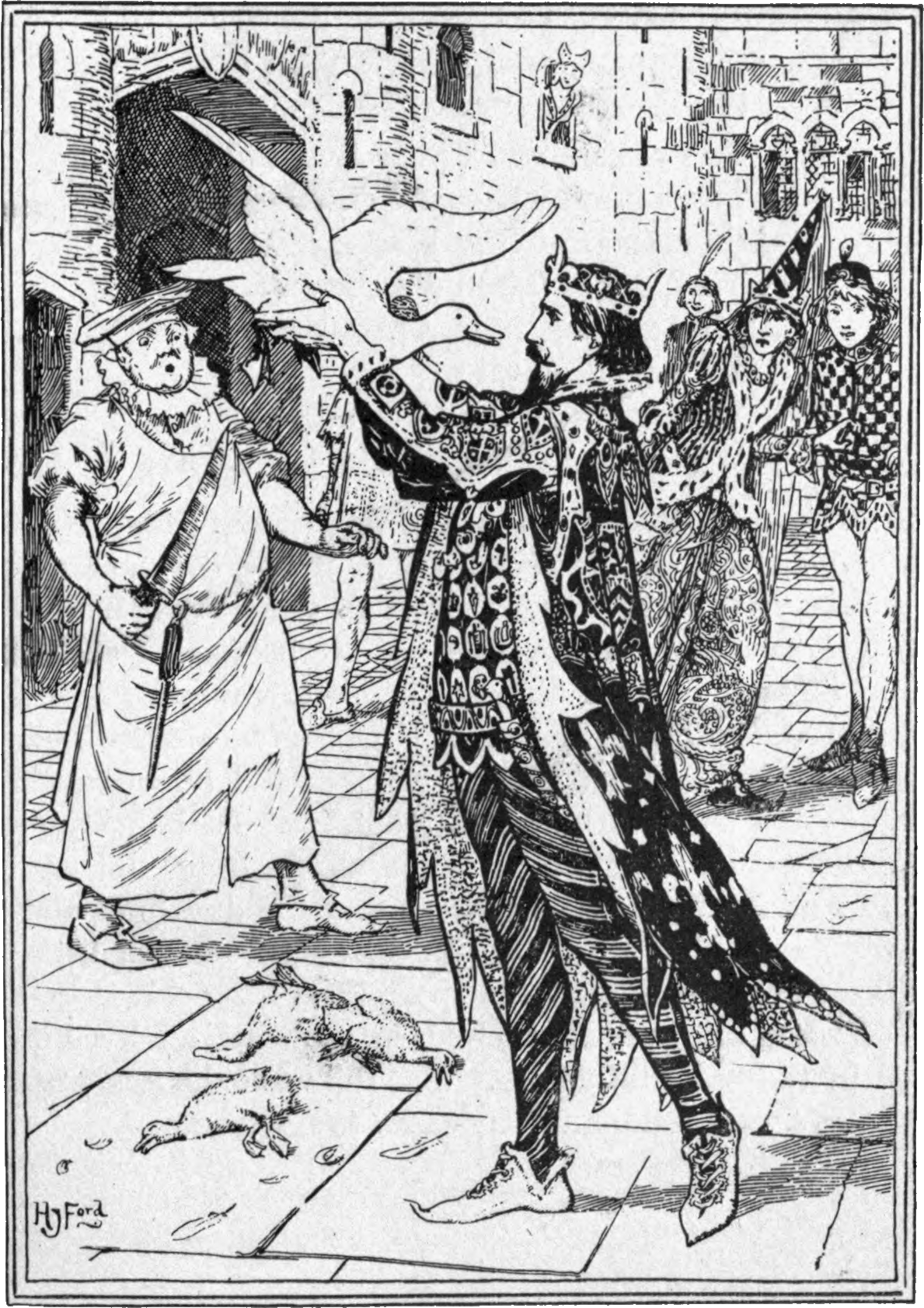
- The tsar captures the white duck in his hands. Illustration from The Yellow Fairy Book (1894).

Folk tale
- Name: The White Duck
- Aarne–Thompson grouping: ATU 403 (The White and the Black Bride)
- Country: Russia
- Origin Date: 1858
- Published in: Narodnye russkie skazki by Alexander Afanasyev

The White Duck (Russian: Белая уточка) is a Russian fairy tale collected by Alexander Afanasyev in Narodnye russkie skazki. Andrew Lang included it in The Yellow Fairy Book.

== Synopsis ==
A king had to leave his newly-wed wife for a journey. He sternly warned her against leaving the women's quarters and listening to bad advice. But an envious wicked witch lured her into the garden and into a pool, and turned her into a white duck, herself taking the queen's own form and place.

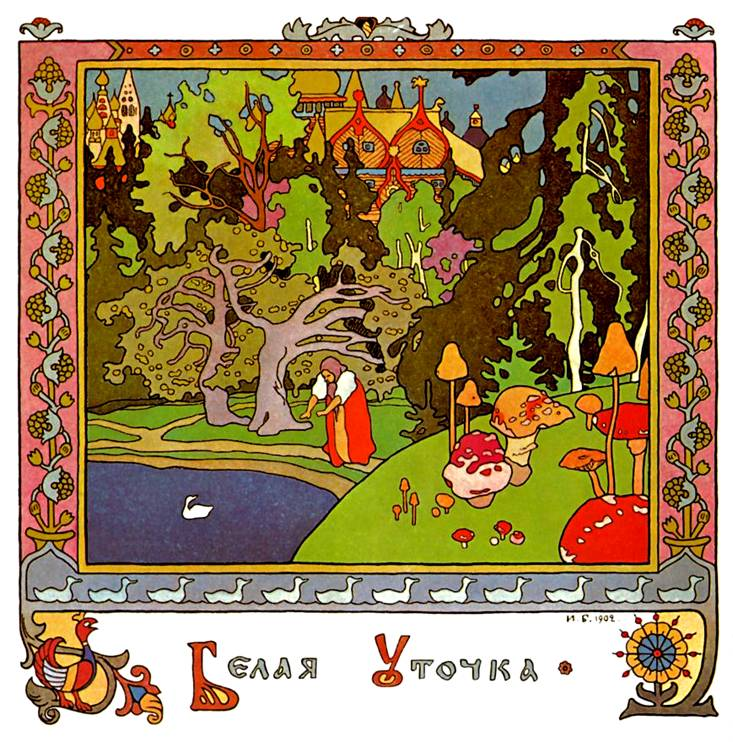
Illustration by Ivan Bilibin

Meanwhile, the white duck built a nest, laid three eggs, and hatched two fluffy ducklings and one little drake. She warned them against the castle, because an evil witch lived there, but one day the witch saw them and lured them inside. The ducklings slept but the drake stayed awake, and when the witch called if they were asleep, the drake answered. But after two answers, the witch went in to see, and saw the ducklings were asleep, so she killed them.

The white duck found the bodies and lamented over them. The king wondered at it, and although the witch tried to persuade him it was nothing but quacking, he ordered that the duck be captured. His servants could not, but he went himself, and she flew to his hands and became a woman. She told of a bottle in the nest in the garden—or, they sent a magpie for magic water—which, sprinkled on the ducklings and drake, turned them into three lovely children. The witch was then put to death through dismemberment and nothing remained of her.

== Translations ==
The tale was also translated "from the Skazki" of Petr Polevoi by Robert Nisbet Bain; as The White Duckling by Nathan Haskell Dole, and as The Little White Duck by professor Jack V. Haney.

== Analysis ==
=== Tale type ===
Soon after he developed his classification of folktales, Finnish folklorist Antti Aarne published, in 1912, a study on the collections of the Brothers Grimm, Austrian consul Johann Georg von Hahn, Danish folklorist Svend Grundtvig, Swiss scholar Laura Gonzenbach and Afanasyev. According to this primary system, developed in 1910, the tale fits type 403, "The White and the Black Bride": the antagonist throws the maiden in the water and takes her place as the hero's bride; the maiden transforms into a dove or a type of water fowl (duck, goose).

Russian scholarship classifies the tale as type 403, "Подмененная жена" ("The Transformed Wife"), of the East Slavic Folktale Classification (Russian: СУС, romanized: SUS): the heroine is enchanted into duck form by her stepmother and replaced by the witch.

== See also ==
- The Three Little Men in the Wood
- The White and the Black Bride
- The Witch in the Stone Boat
- The Wonderful Birch
