= The Two Caskets =

Scandinavian fairy tale

The Two Caskets is a Scandinavian fairy tale included by Benjamin Thorpe in his Yule-Tide Stories: A Collection of Scandinavian and North German Popular Tales and Traditions. Andrew Lang included it in The Orange Fairy Book.

It is Aarne-Thompson type 480, the kind and the unkind girls. Others of this type include Shita-kiri Suzume, Diamonds and Toads, Mother Hulda, Father Frost, The Three Little Men in the Wood, The Enchanted Wreath, The Old Witch, and The Three Heads in the Well. Literary variants include The Three Fairies and Aurore and Aimée.

== Synopsis ==
A woman had a daughter and stepdaughter. One day, she set them to spin while sitting on the edge of a well, giving her daughter good flax and her stepdaughter coarse, unusable flax, and declared that whoever's thread broke first would be thrown in. When her stepdaughter's thread broke, she threw her in.

The girl fell to a wonderful land. She walked on and came to a tumble-down fence that is overgrown with vines. It pleaded with her not to hurt it because it did not have long to live and she carefully jumped over it where the vines were less. She found an oven full of bread loaves and it told her she could eat what she liked, but begged her not to hurt it. She ate a loaf, thanked it for such fine bread, and shut its door. She came to a cow with a bucket on its horns. It said she could milk it and drink, but asked her not to hurt it or spill its milk. She agreed. When a drop of milk was left, the cow told her to throw it over its hooves and hang the bucket back up.

She came to a house. An old woman asked her to comb her hair. When she did, the old woman showed her a farm where she could take service. She took good care of the cows, gave milk to the cats, sieved some corn, and gave some sieved corn to the birds.

One day, the old woman summoned her and told her to fill a sieve full of water and bring it back. The birds told her to use ashes to stop up the holes. Another day, she had to wash some black yarn until it became white and white yarn until it became black. The birds told her to face east to turn the black white and west to turn the white black. Then the old woman had her weave them into a robe as smooth as a king's by sunset, but the skeins tangled and broke every moment. The cats wove it on her behalf.

She wanted to leave and go home. The old woman sent her to an attic and told her to take whatever casket she liked. She considered many beautiful ones. The cats directed her to a black one, so she took it and went home. Her stepmother took her wages, but the box was filled with marvelous treasures.

Her stepmother put her own daughter on the edge of the well to spin with coarse stuff and threw her down the well when it broke. The daughter proceeded as her sister had, but was rude to the fence, the oven, and the cow and worked very poorly at the farm including the three tasks her stepsister had done. At the end of the year, she went on her way with a large red casket. When she opened it at home, fire burst out and burned her and her mother to death.

== See also ==
- The Enchanted Canary
- The Months
- Mother Hulda
- The Witch
- Vasilissa the Beautiful
