= The Three Fairies =

1634 Fairy tale by Giambattista Basile

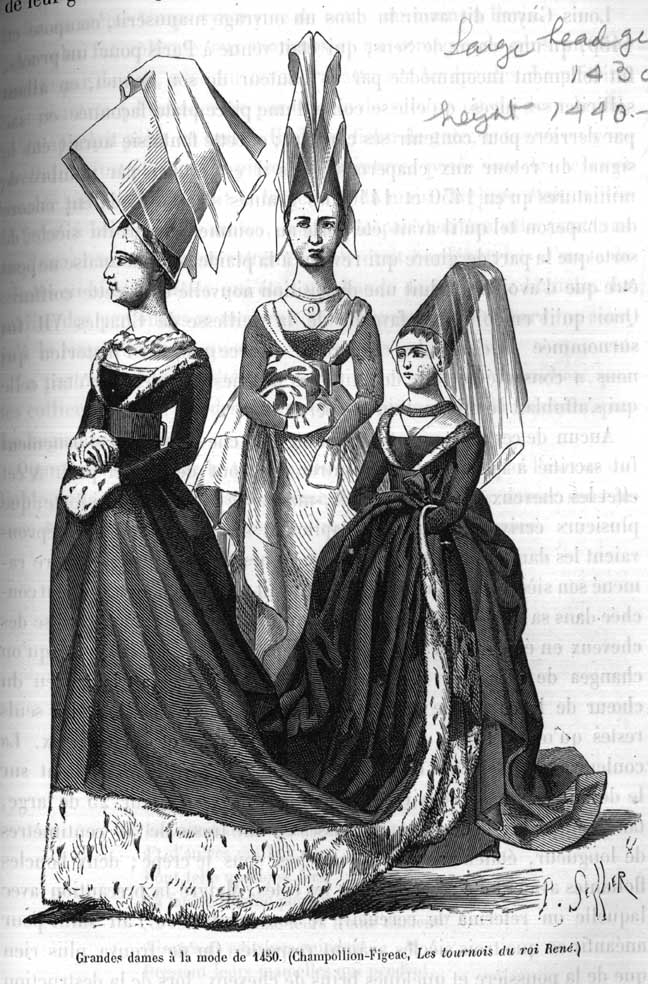

"The Three Fairies" is an Italian literary fairy tale written by Giambattista Basile in his 1634 work, the Pentamerone.

It is Aarne–Thompson tale 480, the kind and the unkind girls, and appears to stem from an oral source. Others of this type include "Diamonds and Toads", "Shita-kiri Suzume", "Mother Hulda", "The Three Heads in the Well", "Father Frost", "The Three Little Men in the Wood", "The Enchanted Wreath", "The Old Witch" and "The Two Caskets". Another literary variant is "Aurore and Aimée". In this tale, like many others of this type, the heroine descends into another world where she is tested.

== Synopsis ==
An envious widow, Caradonia, had an ugly daughter, Grannizia. She married a rich landowner with a lovely daughter, Cicella, and in her envy tormented her stepdaughter, dressing her badly, giving her poor food, and making her work. One day, Cicella dropped her basket over a cliff. She saw, below, a hideous ogre and politely asked him to help her. He said if she climbed, she would get it. She climbed down and found three beautiful fairies at the bottom of the cliff. She was polite with them, combing their hair and claiming to find pearls and rubies along with lice. They took her to their castle and showed her their treasures; she admired them but was not bedazzled. Finally, they showed her rich clothing and asked her to choose a dress; she chose a cheap one. They asked her how she wanted to leave, and she said the stable door was good enough for her. They gave her a splendid gown, dressed her hair, and brought her to a golden door, telling her to look up when she went through it. A star fell on her forehead.

Grannizia went to the same place and was rude, complaining of the lice in their hair. They brought her to the wardrobe, and she grabbed the fanciest dress. They did not give it to her, but sent her out the stable door, where a donkey's testicle fell on her forehead. Her furious mother took Cicella's clothing and gave it to Grannizia, and sent Cicella to tend pigs. There, a nobleman, Cuosemo, saw her and asked her stepmother for leave to marry her. Caradonia agreed, sealed up Cicella in a barrel, and presented Grannizia as the bride instead. After the wedding night, he went back to the house, and a tabby cat told him that Cicella was in the barrel. He let her out, put Grannizia in her place, and fled with her. Caradonia returned with wood, created a fire, and boiled water to scald Cicella to death. She poured it in the barrel. Grannizia died, and Caradonia opened the barrel, saw her own daughter, and drowned herself in the well.
