= Aurore and Aimée =

French literary fairy tale

Folk tale
- Name: Aurore and Aimée
- Aarne–Thompson grouping: ATU 480
- Country: France

Aurore and Aimée is a French literary fairy tale written by Jeanne-Marie Le Prince de Beaumont. Like her better known tale Beauty and the Beast, it is among the first fairy tales deliberately written for children.

It draws on traditional fairy tale motifs from the Aarne–Thompson tale type 480, the kind and the unkind girls; as is common in those tales, the abused daughter finds herself in a new place, where, after a test, a kindly woman rewards her. Folk tales of this type include "Diamonds and Toads", "Shita-kiri Suzume", "Mother Hulda", "The Three Heads of the Well", "Father Frost", "The Three Little Men in the Wood", "The Enchanted Wreath", "The Old Witch" and "The Two Caskets". Another literary variant is "The Three Fairies".

== Synopsis ==
A lady had two daughters. Both were beautiful; Aurore, the older, had a good character, but Aimée, the younger, was malevolent. When Aurore was sixteen and Aimée was twelve, the lady began to lose her looks. Not wanting anyone to know that she was old enough to have children of those ages, she moved to another city, sent Aurore to the country, and claimed that Aimée was only ten and that she had been fifteen when she had given birth to her. Fearing that someone would discover the deception, she sent Aurore to another country, but the person she sent with her abandoned Aurore in the forest. Aurore hunted for a way out and finally found a shepherdess's cottage. She lamented her fate and blamed God; the shepherdess urged that God permitted misfortune only for the benefit of the unfortunate person, and offered to act the part of her mother. After some discussion of the fashionable but often dull life Aurore had been living, the shepherdess pointed out that age would make it less pleasant, and that she herself could teach Aurore how to live without boredom. Aurore agreed, and the shepherdess set her to a life divided into prayer, work, reading, and walks; Aurore found this life very agreeable because it was not dull.

One day, a prince, Ingénu, went hunting. He was a good prince, though his brother Fourbin, the king, was an evil king. He fell in love with and wooed Aurore, and she, properly, sent him to the shepherdess. He begged her to tell him whether it would make her unhappy if the shepherdess consented; she praised his virtue and said that a daughter can not be unhappy with a virtuous husband. The shepherdess did consent, knowing he would make Aurore a good husband, and he left, to return in three days. In that time, Aurore fell into a thicket while she was gathering the sheep, and her face was dreadfully scratched; she lamented this, the shepherdess reminded her that God doubtlessly meant it for good, and Aurore reflected that if Ingénu no longer wished to marry her because her looks were gone, he would not have made her happy.

Meanwhile, Ingénu told his brother of his bride, and Fourbin, angry that he would marry without his permission, threatened to marry Aurore himself if she were as beautiful as Ingénu claimed. He came with him, and on seeing Aurore's marred face, ordered Ingénu to marry her at once and forbade the couple to come to court. Ingénu was still willing to marry her; after Fourbin left, the shepherdess cured Aurore's injuries with a special water.

Back at court, Fourbin ordered portraits of beautiful women brought to him. He was enchanted by one of Aurore's sister Aimée and married her.

After a year, Aurore had a son, Beaujour. One day, he vanished, and Aurore lamented. The shepherdess reminded her that everything happened to her for her own good. The next day, Fourbin's soldiers came; they had been sent to kill the king's nephew. Not finding him, they put Ingénu, Aurore, and the shepherdess to sea in a boat. They sailed to a kingdom where the king was at war. Ingénu offered to fight for the king and killed the commander of his enemies, making the army flee. The king, who was childless, adopted Ingénu as his son. Four years later, Fourbin died of grief because of his wife's wickedness, and his people drove Aimée away and sent for Ingénu to be king. On the way there, they were shipwrecked; this time, Aurore held that it must have happened for the good, and on the land where they were shipwrecked, she found a woman with her son, Beaujour. The woman explained that she was the wife of a pirate, who had kidnapped the boy, but been shipwrecked. Ships came looking for their bodies, and bore back Ingénu, Aurore, and Beaujour back to their kingdom. Aurore never again complained of any misfortune, knowing misfortunes were often the cause of happiness.

== Translation ==
The tale was translated as "Aurora and Amy" in a 1836 publication.
