= Diamonds and Toads =

Fairy tale by Charles Perrault

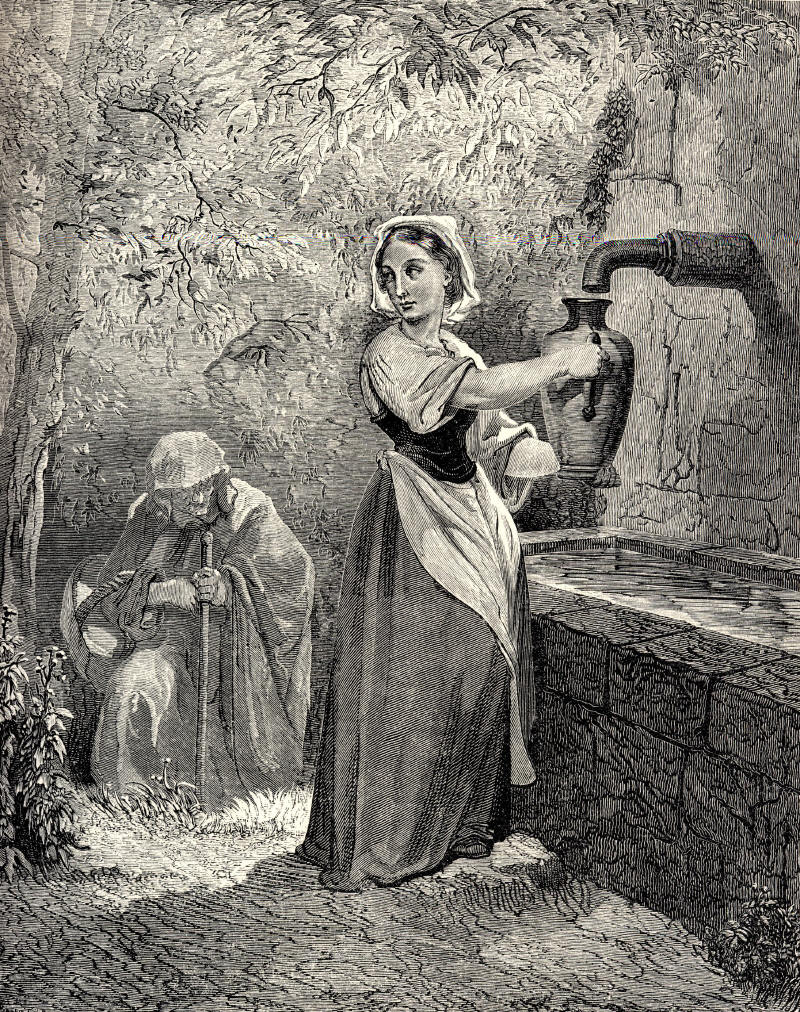
- Illustration by Gustave Doré

Folk tale
- Name: Diamonds and Toads
- Also known as: Toads and Diamonds
- Aarne–Thompson grouping: ATU 480
- Country: France

Diamonds and Toads or Toads and Diamonds is a French fairy tale by Charles Perrault, and titled by him "Les Fées" or "The Fairies". Andrew Lang included it in The Blue Fairy Book. It was illustrated by Laura Valentine in Aunt Louisa's nursery favourite.

In his source, as in Mother Hulda, the kind girl was the stepdaughter, not the other daughter. The change was apparently to decrease the similarity to Cinderella.

It is Aarne-Thompson tale 480, the kind and the unkind girls. Others of this type include Shita-kiri Suzume, Frau Holle or Mrs.Holle, The Three Heads in the Well, Father Frost, The Three Little Men in the Wood, The Enchanted Wreath, The Old Witch, and The Two Caskets. Literary variants include The Three Fairies and Aurore and Aimée.

== Summary ==
A bad-tempered widow has two daughters; her older daughter is disagreeable and proud, but looks and behaves like her mother, and is therefore her favorite child; her younger daughter is sweet, courteous, and beautiful, but resembles her late father. Jealous and bitter, the widow and her favourite daughter abuse and mistreat the younger girl.

One day while drawing water from the well, an old woman asks the younger girl for a drink of water. The girl politely consents and after giving it, she finds that the woman is a fairy, who had disguised herself as a crone to test the character of mortals. As the girl is so kind and compassionate toward her, the fairy blesses her with a jewel or flower falling from her mouth whenever she speaks.

Upon arriving home and explaining why she had taken so long to her mother, the widow is delighted at the sight of gems and flowers falling out the girl's mouth, and desires that her favored eldest daughter must have the same gift as well. The elder girl protests, but the widow forcibly sends her to the well. The girl sets off but the fairy appears as a fine princess, and requests that the girl draw her a drink from the well. The elder daughter speaks rudely to the fairy and insults her. The fairy decrees that, as punishment for her despicable attitude, either a toad or a snake would fall from the rude girl's mouth whenever she speaks.

When the girl arrives home, she tells her story to her mother and toads and vipers fall from her mouth with each word. The widow, in a fury, drives her younger daughter out of the house. In the woods, she met a king's son, who falls in love with and marries her. In time, the widow is sickened by her older daughter, and drives her out, and she dies alone and miserable in the woods.

== Commentary ==
The idea of having jewels fall from a virtuous person is a motif found in various other tales, as in the Italian Biancabella and the Snake.

== Adaptations ==
- Dempsey, Lydia, "The Wishing Well: A Children's Ballet (A Composer's Perspective)" (2016). Honors Projects. 217. https://scholarworks.bgsu.edu/honorsprojects/217
- Levine, Gail Carson “The Fairy’s Mistake”. The Princess Tales. Harper Collins, 1999. ISBN 9780060280604
- Ortberg, Daniel Mallory. ‘Diamonds and Toads’. The Toast, 5 June 2014. https://the-toast.net/2014/06/05/diamonds-toads/
- Pitts, Jessi, "Diamonds and Toads: An Adaptation of Charles Perrault’s Les Fées" (2019). Honors Projects. 118. https://cedar.wwu.edu/wwu_honors/118/
- Tomlinson, Heather. Toads and Diamonds. Henry Holt and Co, 2010. ISBN 9780805089684

== In popular culture ==
In the film, Uncut Gems, students at a high school perform a stage version of the story.

An animated version known as "The Fairy" appeared in an episode of Let's Go Luna!.

The story was featured in the "Respect" episode of Adventures from the Book of Virtues.

== Gallery ==
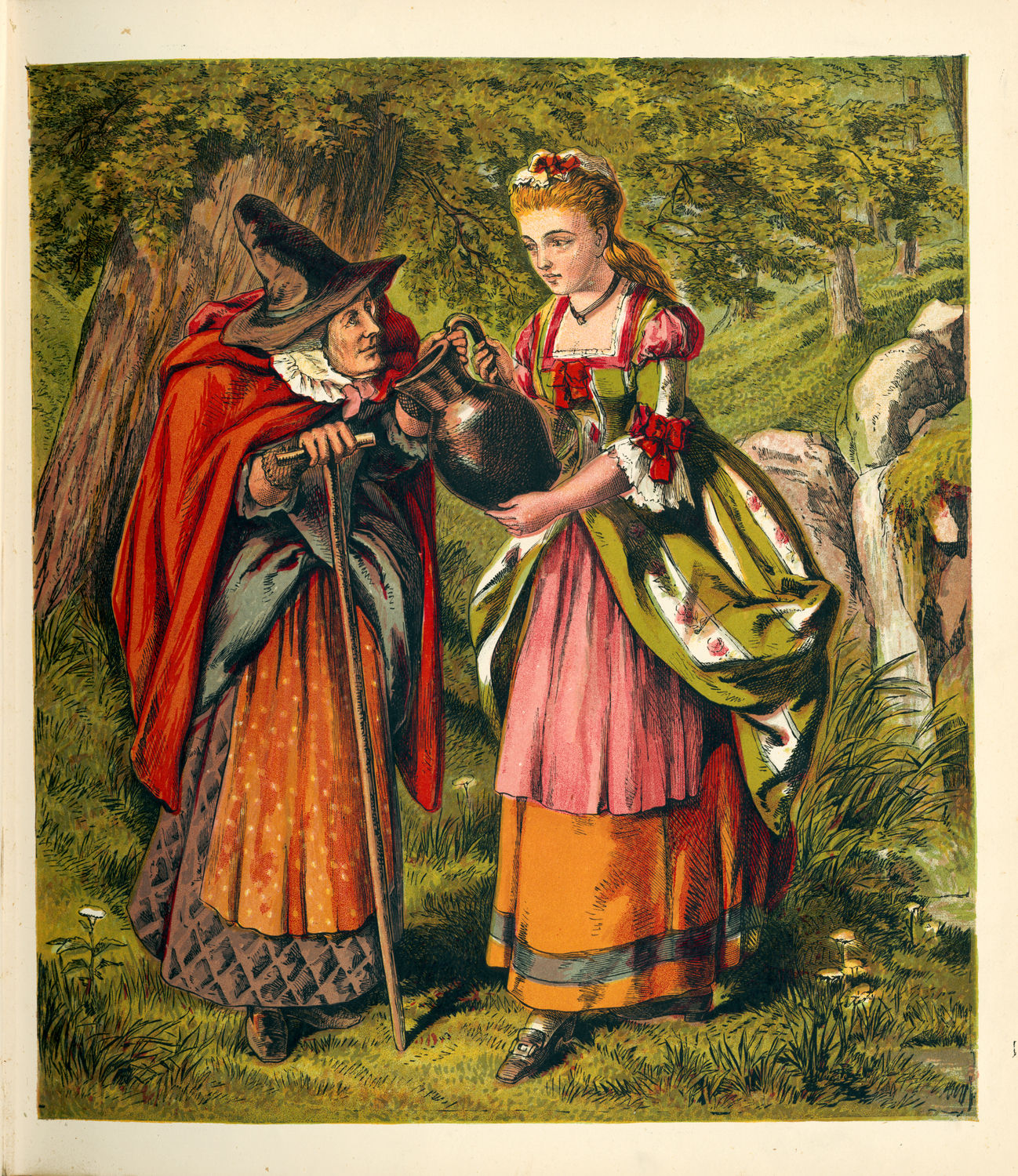
The younger daughter and the fairy.

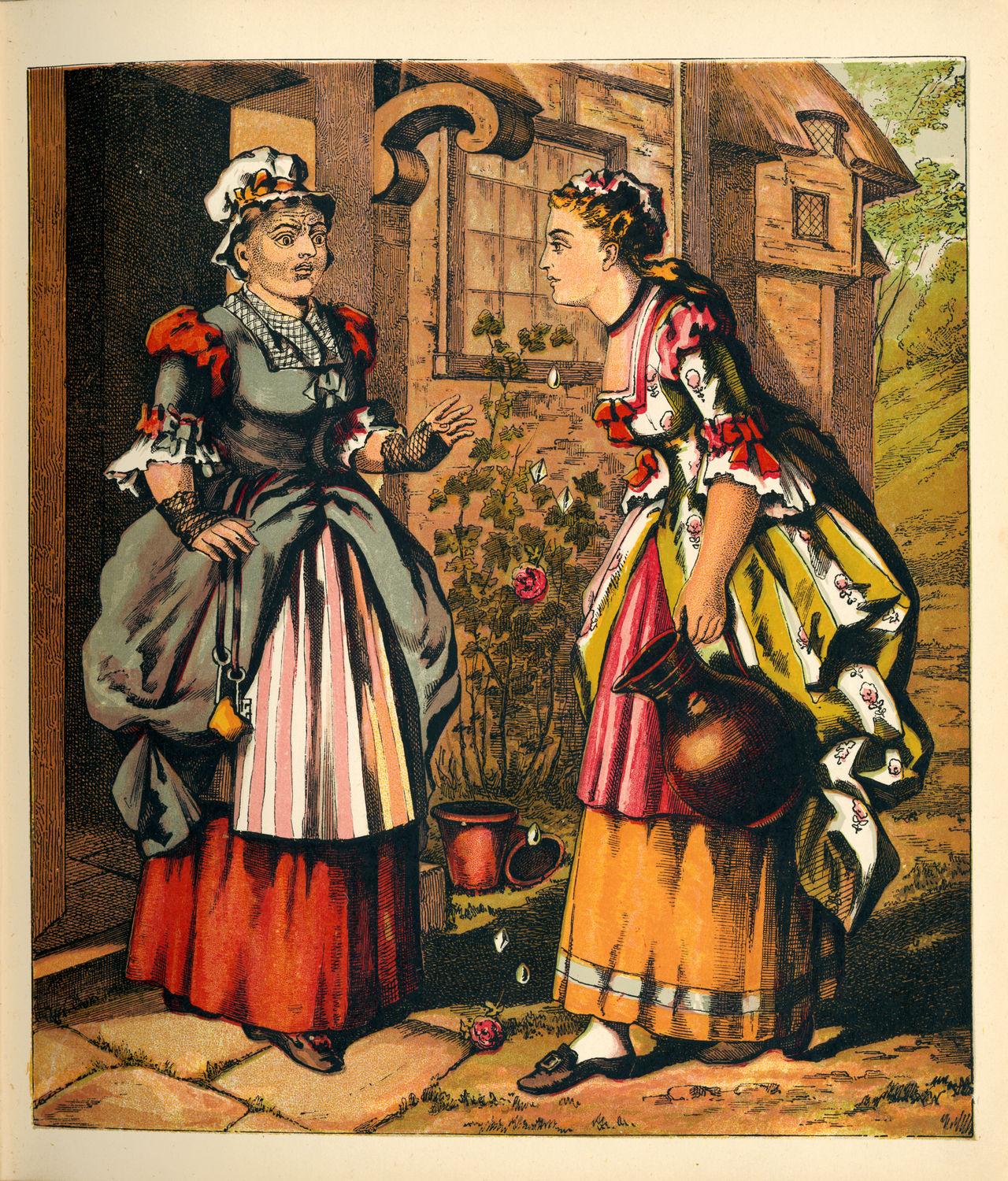
The younger daughter and her mother: the gift.

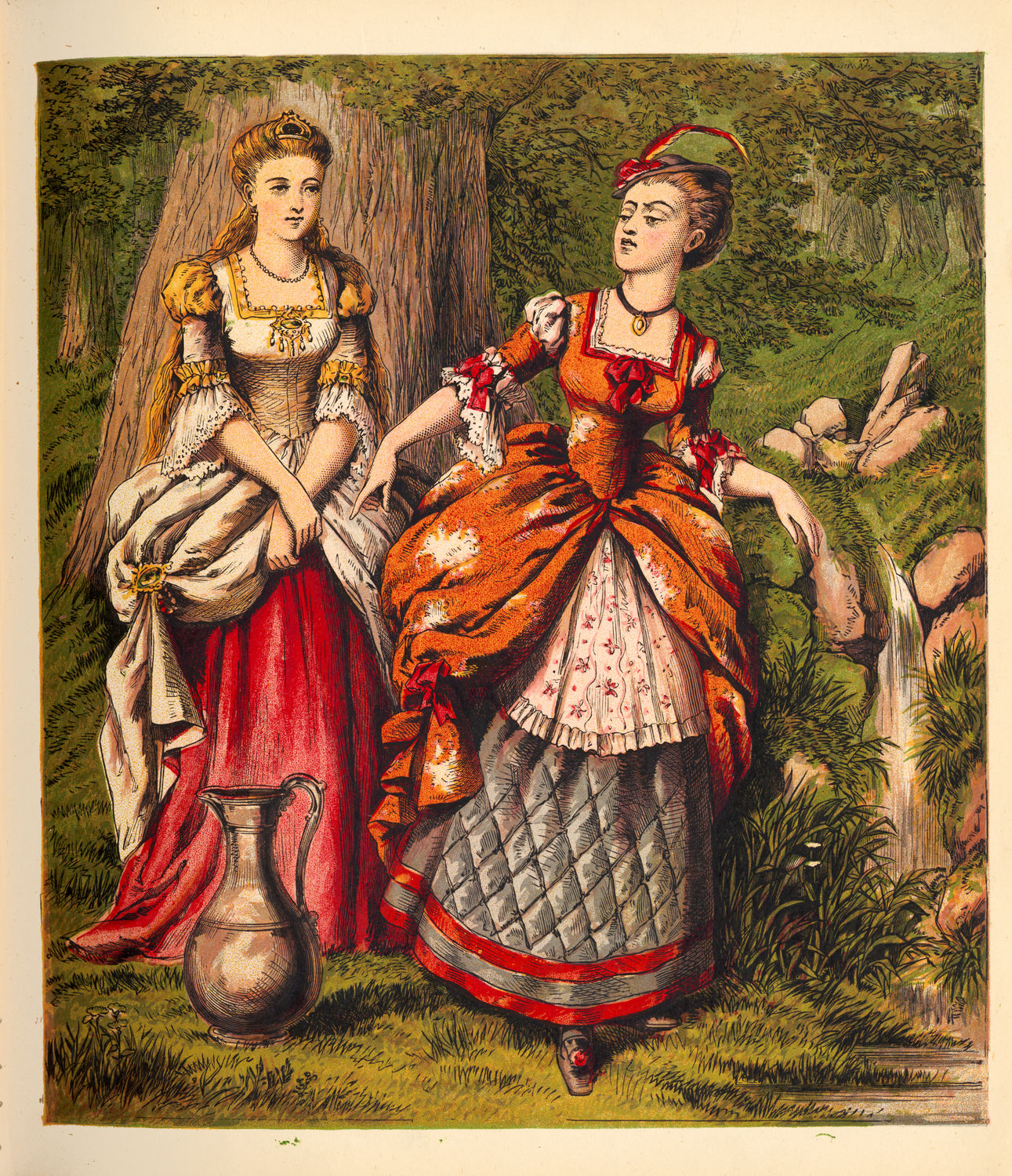
The elder daughter and the fairy.

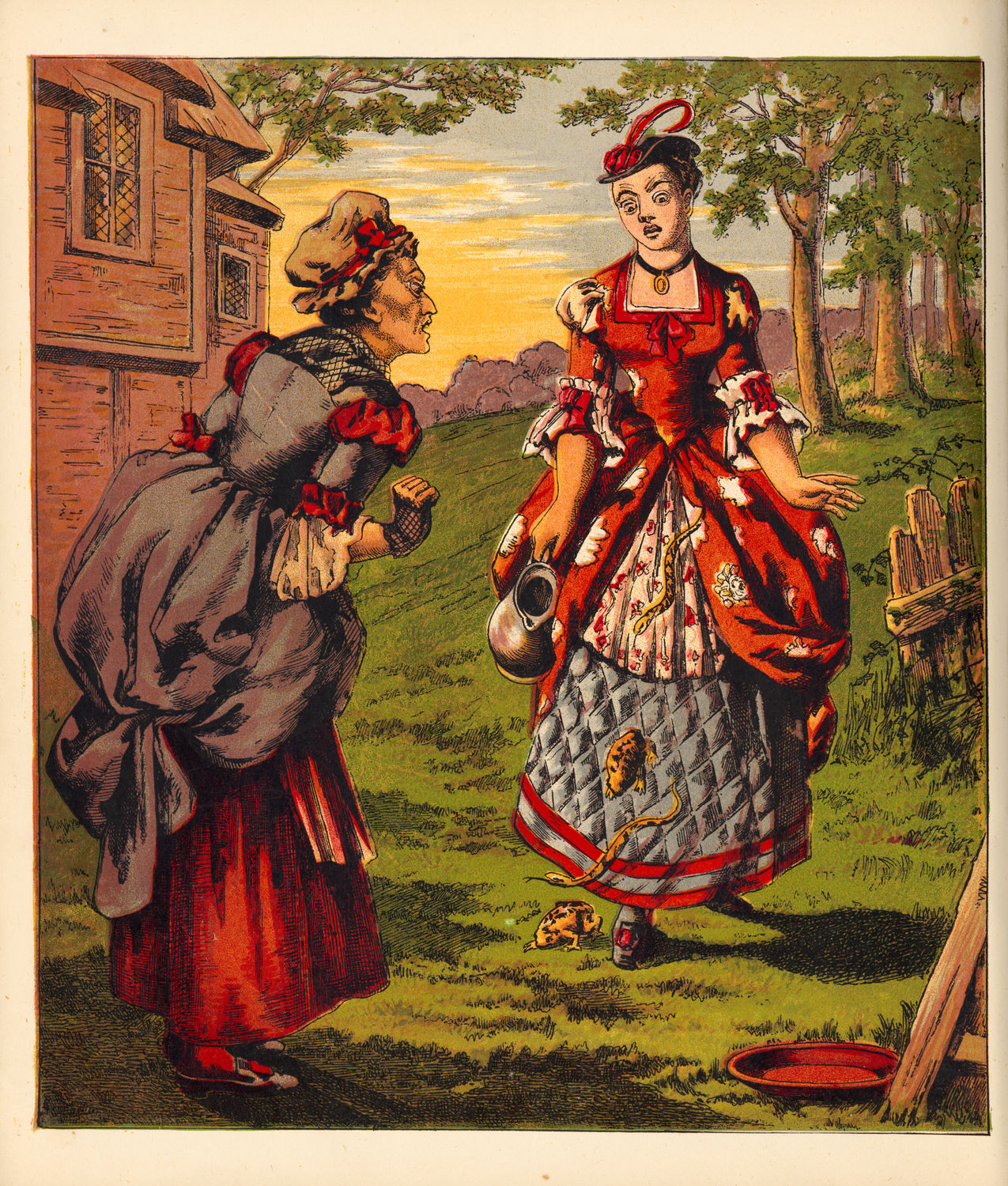
The elder daughter and her mother: the curse.

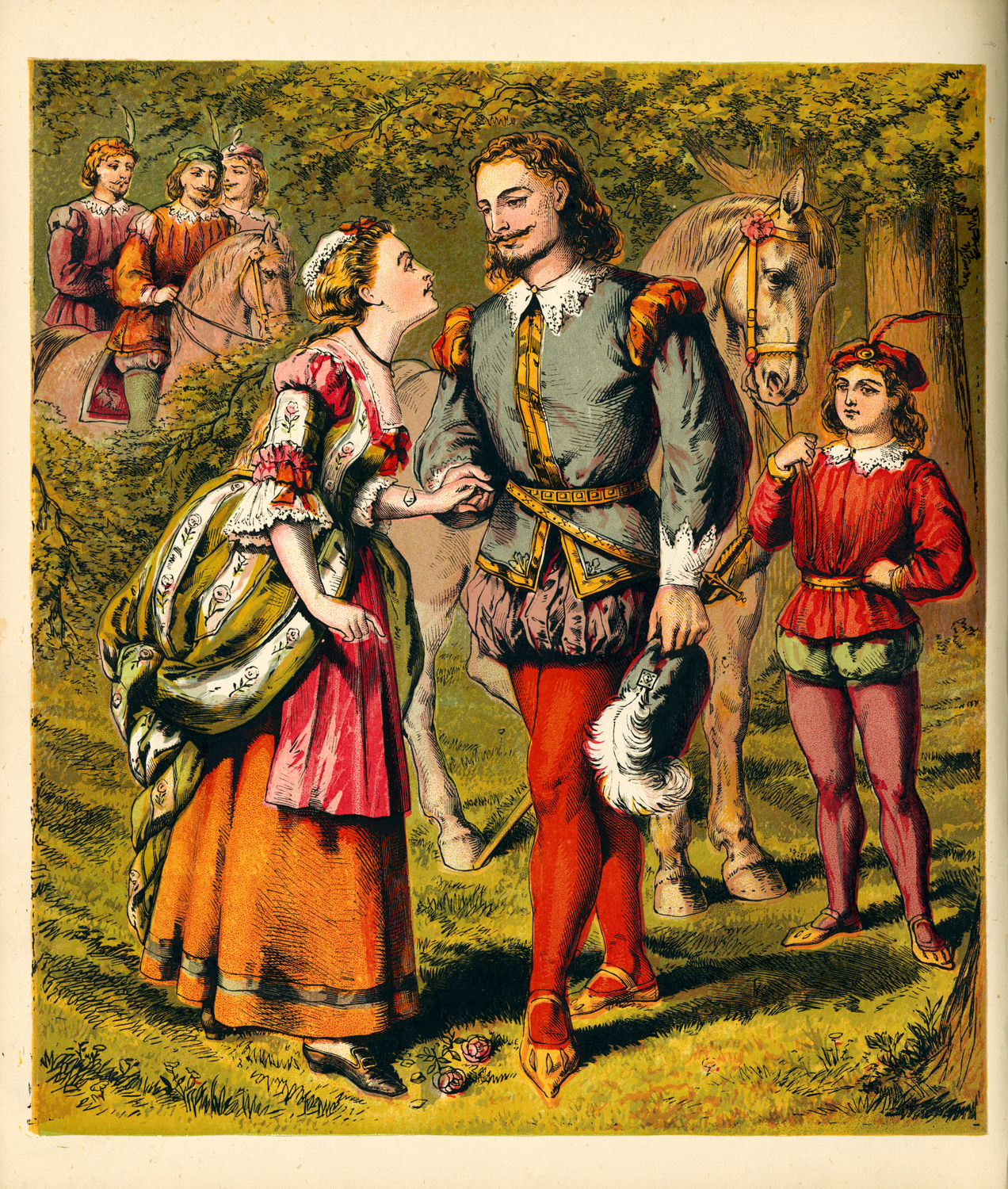
The younger daughter in the wood with the prince.

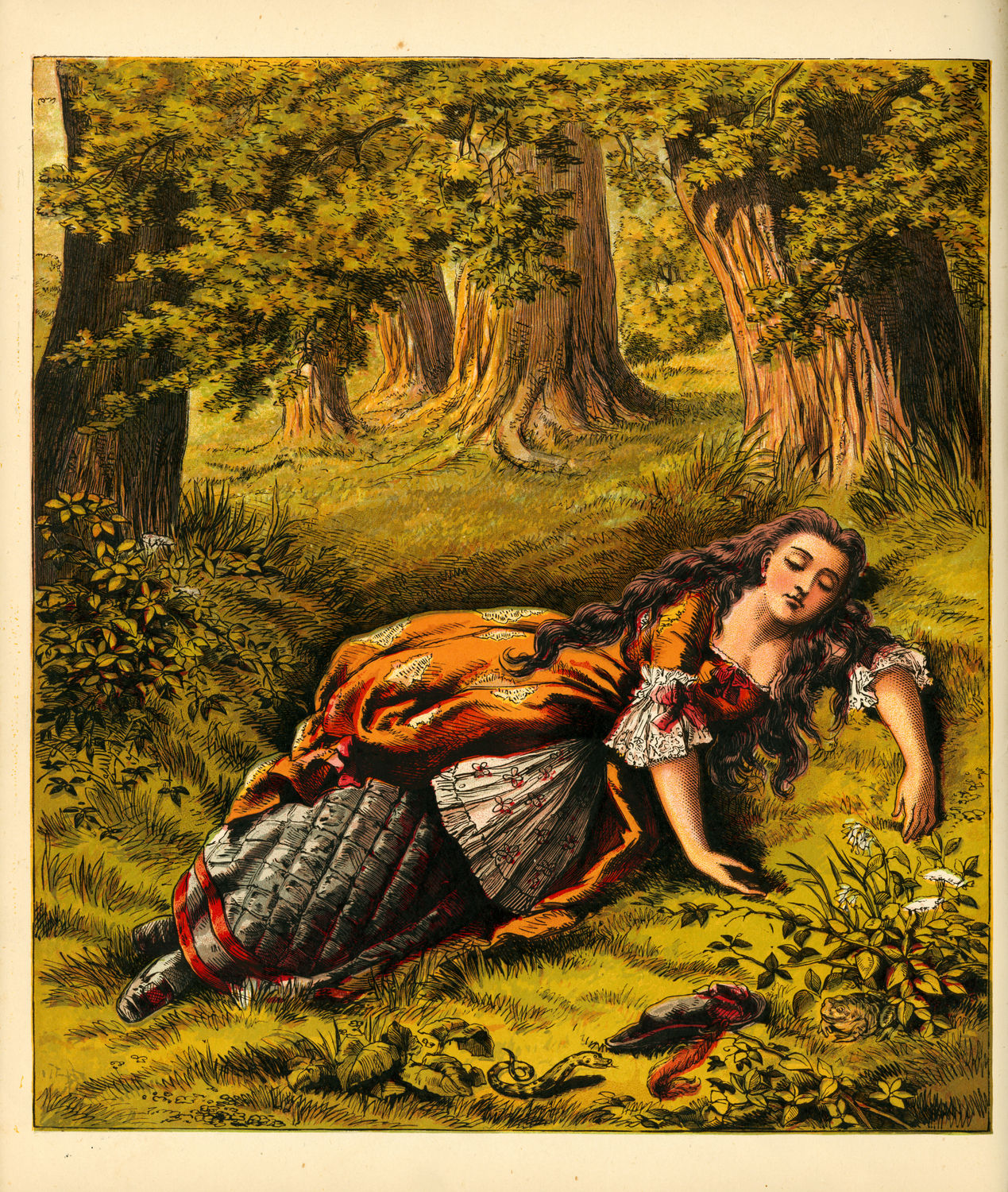
The elder daughter alone in the wood.

== See also ==
- Frau Holle
- Jennifer Murdley's Toad
- Kallo and the Goblins
- The Honest Woodman
- The Months
- True and Untrue
- Youngest sibling
- Cinderella
- Father Frost (fairy tale)
- Heungbu and Nolbu

== Bibliography ==
Koehler, Julie, "Kind Girls, Evil Sisters, And Wise Women: Coded Gender Discourse In Literary Fairy Tales By German Women In The 19th Century" (2016). Wayne State University Dissertations. Paper 1402.

Martin, Laura. ‘The Kind and the Unkind Girls’. 533 -535. The Greenwood Encyclopedia of Folktales and Fairy Tales: Volume 2: G-P. Greenwood Press, 2007.

Opie, Iona and Peter. The Classic Fairy Tales 98-102. Oxford University Press, 1974.

Roberts, Warren E. The Tale of the Kind and Unkind Girls: AA-TH 480 and Related Tales. Wayne State University Press 1994.

Sur La Lune. ‘Diamonds and Toads.’ https://www.surlalunefairytales.com/a-g/diamonds-toads/diamonds-toads-tale.html

Zipes, Jack. ‘Rewards and Punishments for Good and Bad Girls,’ 543- 574. The Great Fairy Tale Tradition from Straparola and Basile to the Brothers Grimm. W.W. Norton, 2001.
