= Father Frost (fairy tale) =

Russian fairy tale

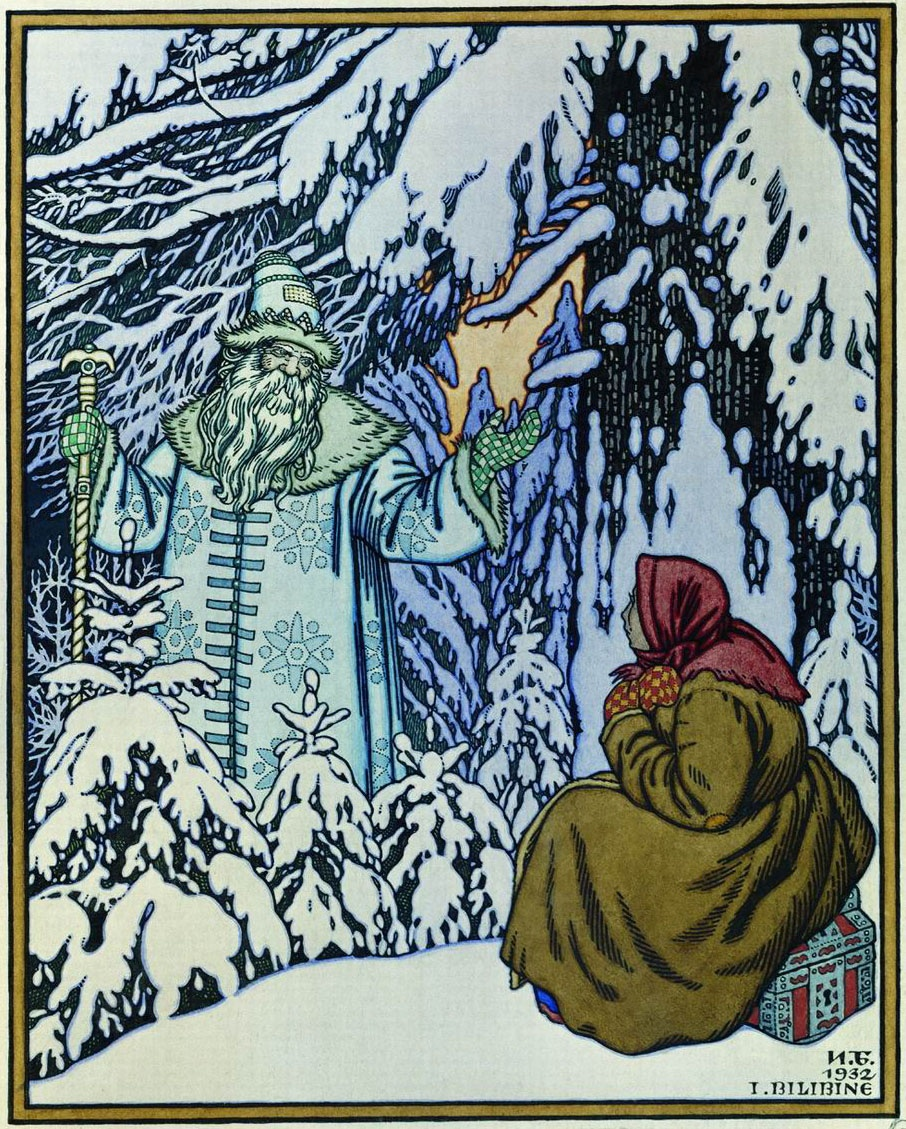
Illustration by Ivan Bilibin

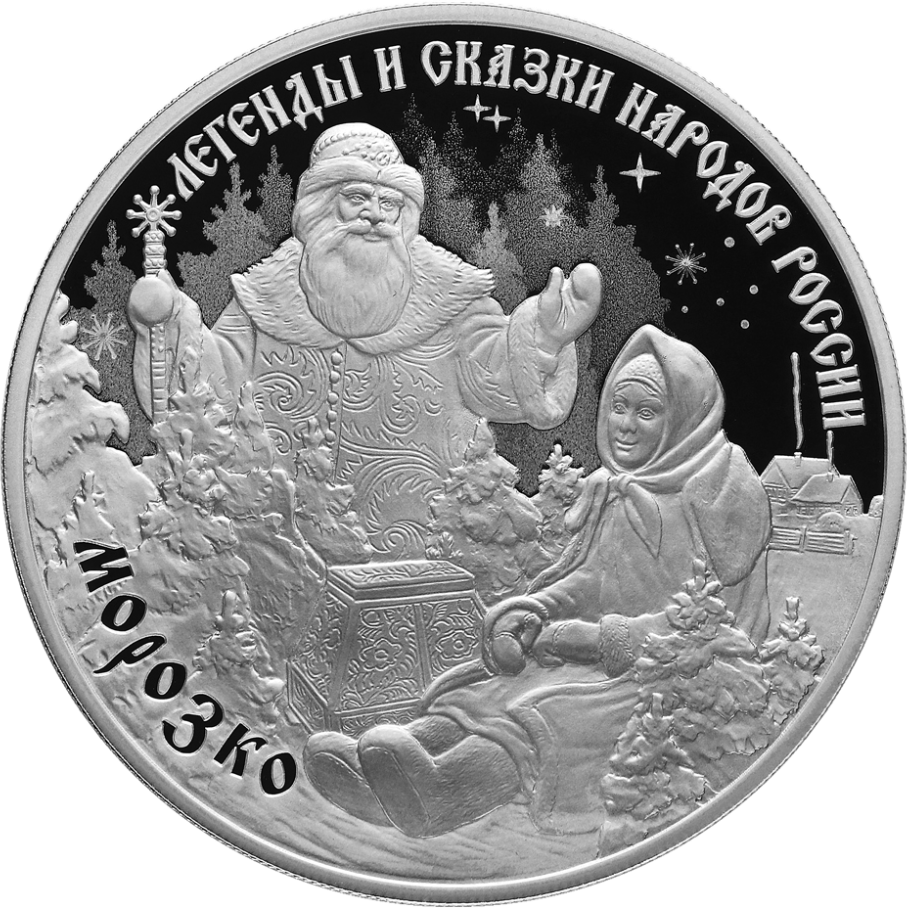
A 2020 Russian commemorative 3-ruble coin

Father Frost (Russian: Морозко, Morozko) is a Russian fairy tale collected by Alexander Afanasyev in Narodnye russkie skazki (1855–63). Andrew Lang included it, as "The Story of King Frost", in The Yellow Fairy Book (1894).

It is Aarne–Thompson type 480, The Kind and the Unkind Girls. Others of this type include Shita-kiri Suzume, Diamonds and Toads, Mother Hulda, The Three Heads in the Well, The Three Little Men in the Wood, The Enchanted Wreath, The Old Witch, and The Two Caskets. Literary variants include The Three Fairies and Aurore and Aimée.

The film Morozko was based on the fairy tale.

== Synopsis ==
A woman has a daughter, whom she loves, and a step-daughter, whom she hates. One day, the woman orders her husband to take her stepdaughter out into the winter wilderness and to leave her there to die, and he obeys, leaving her at the foot of a tree in the forest. Father Frost finds her there, and because the girl is polite and kind to him, he gives her a chest full of beautiful jewels and fine garments. Some time later, the stepmother sends the girl's father to retrieve her body for burial, and is enraged when he instead brings the girl back alive and happy and dressed in finery. Consumed by greed and envy, the woman orders her husband to take her own daughter to the same place, but when found by Father Frost the woman's daughter is rude and unkind to him, and he is inclined to punish rather than reward her. The father finds her frozen to death at the foot of the tree and carries her body back to her grief-stricken mother.

== In popular culture and literary works ==
Morozko is a prominent character in Katherine Arden's Winternight trilogy loosely based on Russian folklore. He appears as a clean-shaven young man with pale skin, black curls and ice-blue eyes who provides seen and unseen aid to the protagonist, Vasilisa "Vasya" Petrovna. He rides a white mare and commands frost, sleep and death.

== See also ==
- Ded Moroz
