= The Three Little Men in the Wood =

German fairy tale

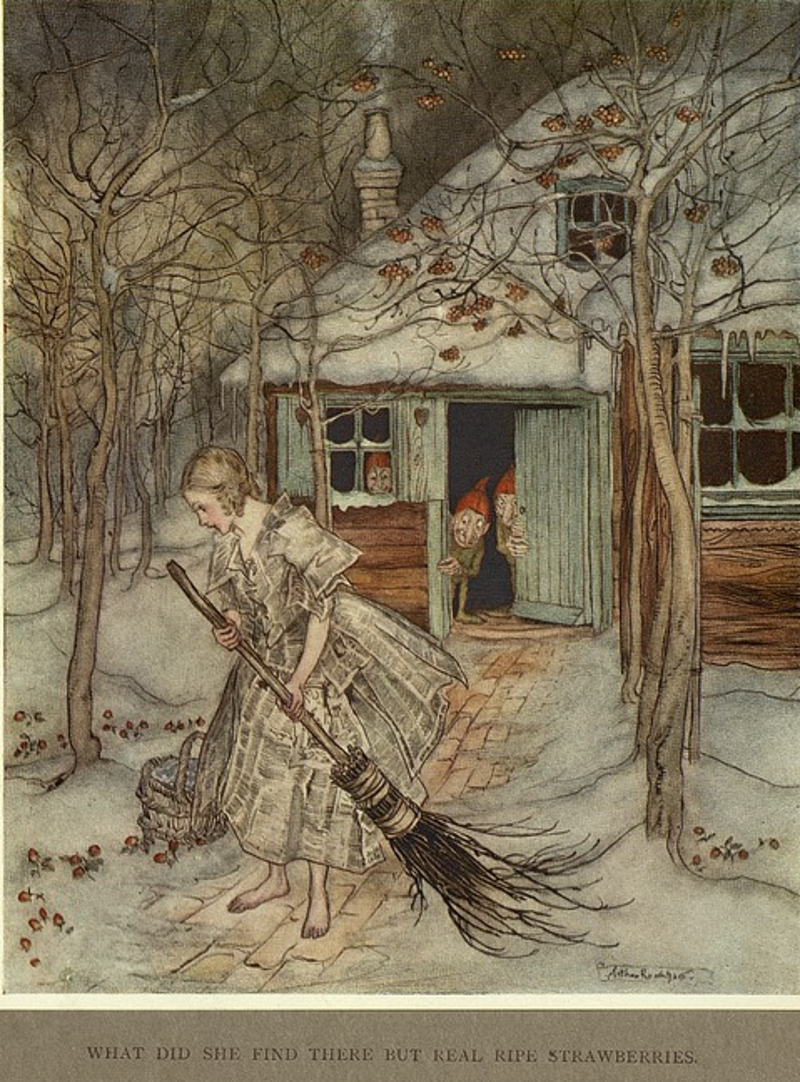
- Illustration by Arthur Rackham, 1917.

Folk tale
- Name: The Three Little Men in the Wood
- Aarne–Thompson grouping: ATU 403B
- Country: Germany
- Published in: Grimm's Fairy Tales

"The Three Little Men in the Wood" or "The Three Little Gnomes in the Forest" (German: Die drei Männlein im Walde) is a German fairy tale collected in 1812 by the Brothers Grimm in Grimm's Fairy Tales (KHM 13). Andrew Lang included it in The Red Fairy Book (1890) as "The Three Dwarfs," and a version of the tale appears in A Book of Dwarfs (1964) by Ruth Manning-Sanders.

It is Aarne-Thompson type 403B ("The Black and the White Bride"), with an episode of type 480 ("The Kind and the Unkind Girls").

== Origin ==
The tale was published by the Brothers Grimm in the first edition of Kinder- und Hausmärchen in 1812. Their source was Wilhelm Grimm's friend and future wife Dortchen Wild (1795–1867). The second edition was expanded with material provided by the story teller Dorothea Viehmann (1755–1815) and by Amalie Hassenpflug (1800–1871).

== Synopsis ==
A woman offers her hand in marriage to a widower: in return, her daughter would wash and drink water, and the man's daughter would wash with milk and drink wine. After performing a test to determine his choice, he marries the woman, who keeps her word. However, by the second day of marriage, both daughters bathe and wash with water. By the third, the man's daughter washes with and drinks water, while the woman's daughter drinks wine and washes with milk. It remains this way afterwards, because the woman secretly hates her step-daughter due to her being prettier than her own.

One day during winter, the step-mother makes her step-daughter put on a paper dress and go out to find strawberries. The girl is horrified by this, as no fruit can be found in winter and the dress will not protect her from the cold. The step-mother forces her to go out, forbidding her return until strawberries are brought. In reality, this is a plot to get rid of the girl due to the step-mother's immense hatred of her. The girl soon finds a small house with three little men inside. She shows great kindness towards them as a houseguest, offers them her coarse food given by the step-mother, and cleans house for them also. The men, feeling sorry for her circumstances, decide to give her three gifts: she will grow prettier every day, gold will fall from her mouth at every word, and she will one day marry a king. The girl eventually finds strawberries near the back of their house and makes her way home happily.

The girl returns home, but faces the envy of her step-sister, who wants the same rewards. Her mother initially doesn't let her search for strawberries, but the step-sister begs until she is allowed. She is given a warm coat and good food, and soon finds the house with the three little men. However, she acts rudely towards them and refuses to clean. When she realizes she won't be given anything, she takes her leave. The three men decide to punish her for her behavior: the girl will grow uglier every day, toads will jump out from her mouth at every word, and she will die a horrible death. The step-sister returns home unhappily, and her mother is disgusted by the toads that come out of her mouth.

The step-mother's hatred for her step-daughter increases day by day due to her becoming more beautiful. She dips yarn into boiling water and gives the girl an axe to cut a hole in an iced river to rinse it. During the time she is doing so, a king arrives in his coach and is infatuated with her beauty. He takes her along to his castle and marries her as the three men had foretold. Soon after, she has a baby boy. However, the step-mother hears of this and arrives with her daughter, pretending to visit. When they are alone, they both seize the queen and toss her out the window, where she falls into a stream and drowns. The woman's daughter is immediately given the place of the queen, and the king is told she is sick, so toads now come from her mouth instead of gold.

During the night, the kitchen-boy witnesses a duck swim up the gutter and ask for the statuses of the king and baby. The boy answers they sleep quietly. The duck temporarily turns into the queen to care for her baby and swims off as a duck through the gutter. This happens again two more times: on the third, she tells the kitchen-boy to tell the king to brandish his sword over her three times. The boy tells the king, who does so, and the duck turns back into the queen, who comes back to life.

The king hides his wife during his child's baptism to confront the step-mother and false queen. He asks the step-mother what the punishment should be for someone who drags another from bed and drowns them: the woman foolishly answers that they should be placed in a cask with nails inside and rolled down a hill into the water. The king then exclaims she has just spoken her own sentence, so the step-mother and false queen are then put inside said cask and rolled down a hill into a nearby river.

== Structure ==
This tale combines two sequences, which are often found together—see, for example, The Enchanted Wreath, Maiden Bright-eye, or Bushy Bride—but which can also be two separate stories:

First, there is the "kind and unkind girls" tale, where variants include Frau Holle, The Fairies, The Three Heads in the Well, The Two Caskets, The Months, and Father Frost. Literary variants include The Three Fairies and Aurore and Aimée.

Second, the theme of the stepmother (or another woman) managing to usurp the true bride's place after the marriage, is often found in other fairy tales, where the obstacles to the marriage differ, if they were part of the tale: The Wonderful Birch, Little Brother and Little Sister, The Witch in the Stone Boat, Bushy Bride, or The White Duck.

== Influences ==
The story appears to be influenced by Charles Perrault's variant, The Fairies, as the heroine receives a similar reward to the heroine in that tale.

== Variants ==
In some versions the queen asks the king to show mercy to the stepmother and daughter, so instead of executing them he banishes them from the kingdom.
