= The Months (fairy tale) =

Italian fairy tale in Pentamerone, 1634

The Months is an Italian literary fairy tale written by Giambattista Basile in his 1634 work, the Pentamerone.

== Synopsis ==
Cianne and Lise were brothers, and Cianne was rich and Lise poor. Lise set out to wander the world. He met with twelve youths, who welcomed him and asked him about the months. Lise said they each had their place and purpose, and it was arrogant of people to want to rearrange them. One told him that March, which was the month, was very burdensome; he answered that it advanced spring; the youth, who was the month of March, gave him a casket that granted wishes. With it, he had an easy journey home and was prosperous.

His brother was jealous of him, and Lise told him of the inn and the twelve youths, but not how they had talked. Cianne went there and received a whip. When he tried to use it, it whipped him until his brother came and used the casket to stop it. Then Lise shared his good fortune with Cianne.

== Commentary ==
The tale follows a common pattern, of one sibling being polite to a powerful being and receiving gifts, of the second sibling being rude and receiving punishment, but in most such tales – "Diamonds and Toads", "Mother Hulda", "The Three Heads in the Well", "Father Frost", or "The Two Caskets" – the siblings are sisters or stepsisters in Aarne-Thompson type 480, The Kind and the Unkind Girls.

== See also ==
- The Twelve Months
