= Prince Ring =

Icelandic fairy tale

Folk tale
- Name: Prince Ring
- Country: Iceland
- Published in: The Yellow Fairy Book

"Prince Ring" (Icelandic: Sagan af Hríngi kóngssyni) is an Icelandic folktale, collected by Jón Árnason.

Andrew Lang translated the tale into English as "Prince Ring" in The Yellow Fairy Book (1894).

== Textual notes ==
"Sagan af Hríngi kóngssyni" ("the story of Hríngur, the king's son") is one of the Icelandic folktales that appeared in Jón Árnason's anthology, Íslenzkar Þjóðsögur og Æfintýri Vol. 2 (1862–64).

It was later translated as "Ring, der Königssohn" by Josef Poestion in Isländische Märchen (1884), and subsequently by Adeline Rittershaus as "Snati-Snati" (1902), as provided by the bibliographical endnote in Hans Naumann's edition. The German translation by Hans and Ida Naumann in turn was entitled "Der Königssohn Ring und der Hund Snati-Snati" (1922).

Andrew Lang printed "Prince Ring" in The Yellow Fairy Book (first edition, 1894) without attribution except being "from the Icelandic", but elsewhere, he identifies his source for Icelandic tales as Poestion's German-translated anthology.

== Synopsis ==
A prince named Ring (Icelandic: Hríngur) and his men hunted a hind with a golden ring on its horns. A darkness came over them, and they lost the hind and their way, and separated because they each thought they knew better the way back home. The prince came upon a woman on the seashore, next to a barrel. He saw a golden ring in the barrel, and mentioned it. The woman said he might have it if he took it out; when he bent over, she pushed him in, fastened the top, and threw it into the sea. It drifted a time, but hit against rocks. He guessed he was near land, kicked out the top, and swam ashore. A giant found him there and took him home to his wife. One day, the giant showed him everything of the house but the parlour. When the giant was gone, he tried to look in As soon as he did, something within moved and tried to speak, frightening him off. He tried two more times, and the third was brave enough to see a great black dog, and that it said, "Choose me, Prince Ring."

Sometime later, the giant said that he did not have long to live, and so would carry him back to the mainland. He offered the prince anything to take with him; the prince chose what was in the parlour. Surprised, the giant nevertheless gave him the dog and took him to shore in a stone boat, telling him at the end that he could claim the island in two weeks, in which time he and his wife would be dead. The prince and dog walked on. The dog told him he was not curious, since he did not ask his name; the prince asked, and the dog said to call it "Snati-Snati". Then they came to a castle, and the dog told him to take service and get a little room for them both.

The king quickly esteemed Ring. A counsellor named Red told him that it was odd, when Ring had done so little. The king set both Ring and Red to cutting trees; Ring took two axes, and Snati-Snati cut as well, so that they cut more than twice what Red cut. Growing more jealous, Red said that the king should get Ring to kill and flay the wild oxen in the woods. Finally, the king sent him. There were two, and Snati-Snati took the larger and Ring the smaller, with some help from the dog. The king highly favored him after this.

Red persuaded him to set Ring to find the gold cloak, chess-board, and piece that the king had lost a year ago. The king added that if he found them before Christmas, he could marry the king's daughter. Snati-Snati told him to get all the salt he could, and then carried it as they set out. The dog helped him up a cliff, and they came to a hut. Four trolls slept, and the porridge pot was on the fire. Snati-Snati told Ring to pour all the salt into the pot. When the trolls woke, the old hag ate first and complained that she had stolen milk from seven kingdoms and now it was salt. After they ate, the old one became thirsty and sent her daughter to fetch water, but the daughter would not unless the old hag gave her the gold piece. The daughter took it and went, but when she bent to drink, the prince and dog pushed her in. The hag grew thirstier, and sent her son, though he demanded the golden cloak; he met the same fate as his sister. Finally, she sent her husband, though he demanded the golden chessboard; he met the same fate as his children, but when the prince and dog went back to the cottage, his ghost followed them. They had to wrestle with it and defeat it a second time. At the cottage, Snati-Snati said they had to go inside, once the hag got out they could not defeat her, but he would attack with a red-hot iron from the fire and the prince must pour boiling porridge over her, and by those means, they defeated her. They returned to the king late Christmas night. The king was well pleased, but the dog asked Prince Ring to trade places for the night: he would sleep in the prince's bed, and the prince where he usually slept. Ring agreed, but after a time, the dog sent him to his own bed, with instructions not to meddle with anything about it.

In the morning, Red went to the king, with his hand cut off, and demanded justice, but Ring showed him the bed, where the hand still held a sword. The king hanged Red and married Ring to his daughter. Snati-Snati asked to sleep at the foot of the bed, their wedding night; Ring granted this, and in the morning, saw a prince sleeping there, with an ugly dogskin beside him. Ring burned the dogskin and woke the prince. This prince was also named Ring. His father had married a woman who was a witch and who had cursed him into that shape until a prince of his name let him sleep at his feet his wedding night. This stepmother had been the hind he had hunted, and the woman who had pushed him into the barrel, for fear that the curse would be broken. After the witch was killed, they divided the trolls' treasure, and Ring married the other Ring to his sister, giving him his father's kingdom, while he stayed with his father-in-law and had half the kingdom and the whole after his death.

== See also ==
- The Master Maid
- The Magician's Horse
- The Gold-bearded Man
- Thirteenth
- Esben and the Witch
- Boots and the Troll
- Kisa the Cat
- Hans My Hedgehog
- Prince Lindorm
