= The Grateful Beasts =

Hungarian fairy tale

Folk tale
- Name: The Grateful Beasts
- Aarne–Thompson grouping: ATU 613 (Truth and Falsehood); ATU 554 (The Grateful Animals)
- Country: Hungary
- Published in: Mährchen der Magyaren by Georg von Gaal (1822); Märchensaal Vol. II, by Hermann Kletke (1845); The Yellow Fairy Book, by Andrew Lang
- Related: The Queen Bee (Grimm's fairy tale); The Enchanted Princess (German fairy tale)

The Grateful Beasts (German: Die dankbaren Thiere) is a Hungarian fairy tale collected by Georg von Gaal (hu) in Mährchen der Magyaren (1822). The tale was also published by Hermann Kletke in Märchensaal, Vol II (1845).

== Synopsis ==
Three sons of a family set out together to seek their fortune. The youngest, Ferko, was so beautiful that his older brothers thought he would be preferred, so they ate his bread while he slept, and refused to share theirs until he let them put out his eyes and break his legs. When they had blinded and crippled him, they left him.

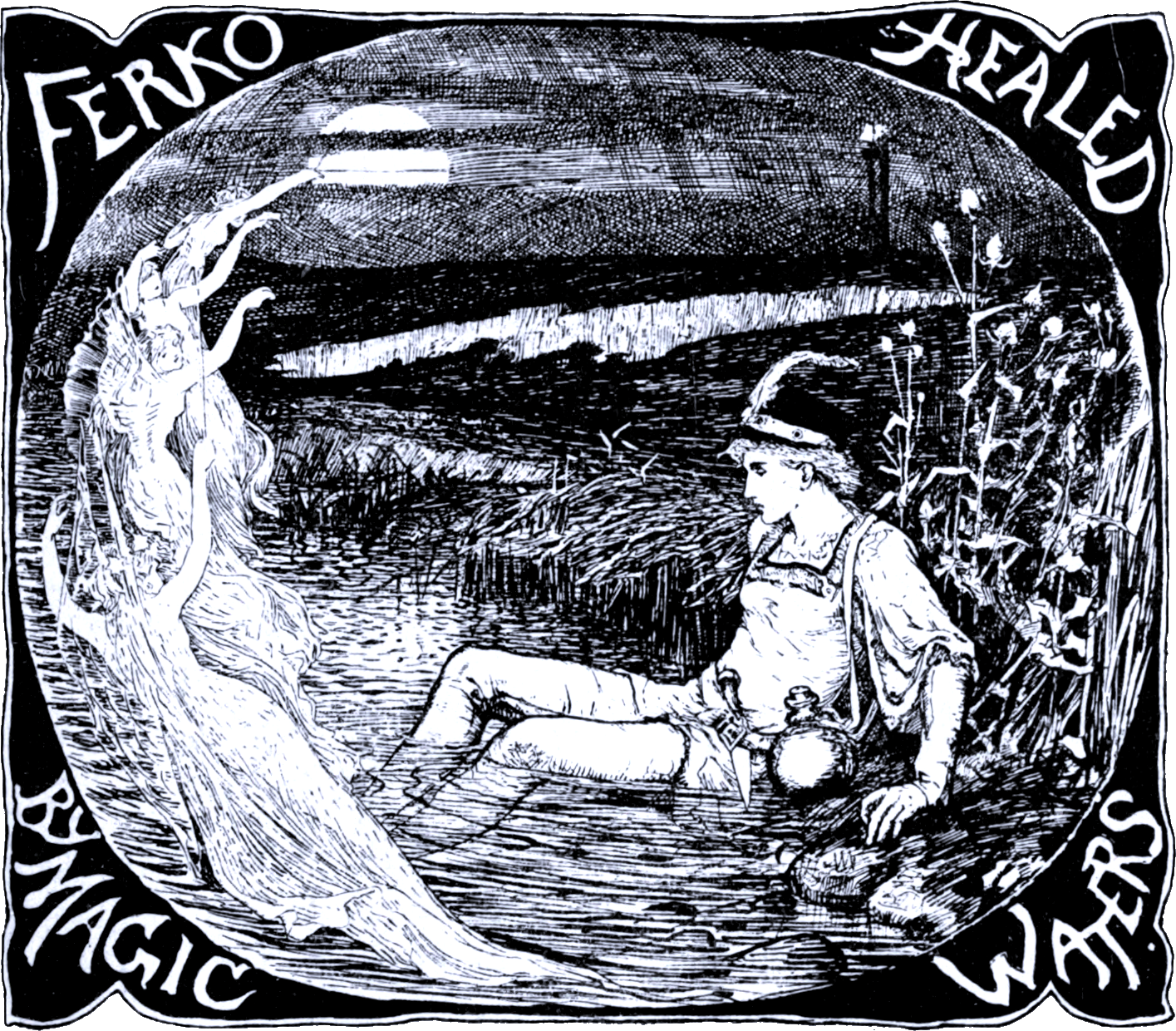
Ferko heals his legs

Ferko crawled on and, in the heat of the day, rested under what he thought was a tree, but was a gallows. Two crows talked together, and one told the other that the lake below them would heal any injury, and the dew on the hillside would restore eyesight. As soon as evening came, he washed his face in the dew, and crawled down to the lake and was whole again. He took a flask of the water and went on. On the way, he met and healed an injured wolf, a mouse, and a queen bee.

Ferko found a kingdom and sought service with the king. His two brothers were already working for the same king and became fearful that he would reveal their wickedness. They accused him of being a wicked magician who had come to kidnap the king's daughter. The king summoned Ferko, told him the accusation, and said he would execute him unless he performed three tasks, in which case he would be exiled. His brothers suggested that he should be asked to build a castle more beautiful than the king's. The princess was distressed by the cruelty of their act. Ferko despaired, but the bee came to him and heard his plight. The bees built such a castle, of flowers.

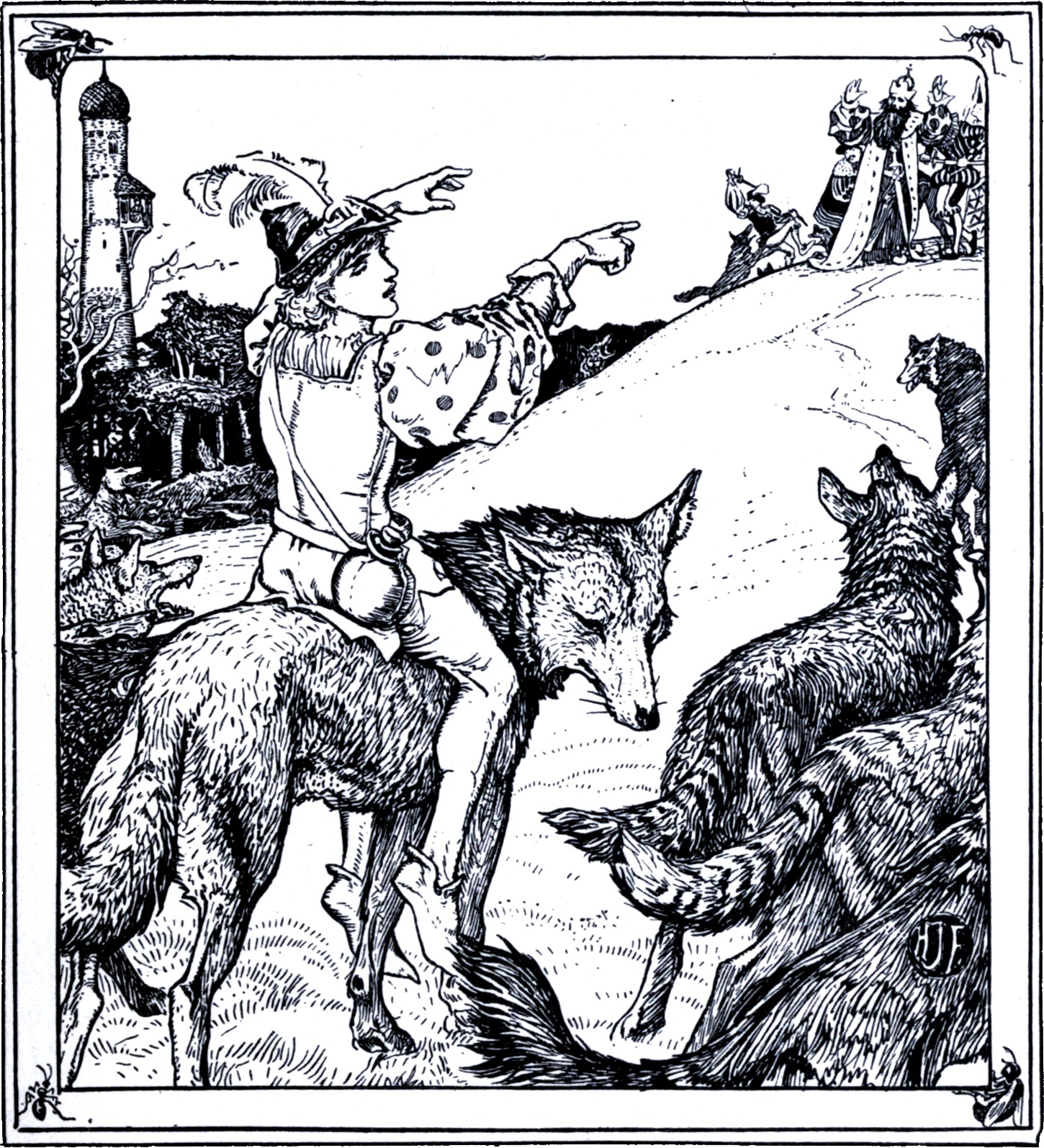
Ferko commands the wolves to attack the court. Illustration for The Yellow Fairy Book (1894).

For the next task, they suggested that the corn in the kingdom had been cut but not put in barns and Ferko should put it in the barns; The mice put the kingdom's entire corn harvest in the barns during the night, not losing a stalk. For the third task, the brothers suggested that he drive all the wolves in the kingdom to the hill they were on. At this, the princess burst into tears, and her father locked her in a tower. The wolf Freko had healed gathered all his fellows and came to the hill, where the wolves tore the king, the wicked brothers, and all his court to pieces.

Ferko freed the princess and married her, and the wolves went peacefully back to the woods.

== Translations ==
The tale was also translated as Die drei Thiere ("The Three Animals") by German philologist Heinrich Christoph Gottlieb Stier (de). It was also translated as A’ háláadatos Állatok, in the Hungarian periodical Hasznos Mulatságok, in 1822.

Andrew Lang translated the tale as The Grateful Beasts and included it in The Yellow Fairy Book.

== Analysis ==
=== Tale type ===
The tale is classified in the Aarne-Thompson-Uther Index as both ATU 613, "Truth and Falsehood", and ATU 554, "The Grateful Animals". In this regard, Hungarian scholar Ákos Dömötör, in the 1988 revised edition of the Hungarian Folktale Catalogue (MNK), also classified the tale as types AaTh 554, Hálás állatok ("Grateful Animals"), and AaTh 613, Igazság és Hamisság ("Truth and Falsehood").

According to folklorist Stith Thompson, the type ATU 613 sometimes begins when one of the travelers refuses to share his food until his companion blinds himself. The now blinded man, abandoned by his friends, wanders about until he hears some voices (ghosts, spirits, animals, witches) conversing with each other and commenting on a place that hides healing properties. The man arrives at the place they mentioned and heals his sight. According to Hungarian scholarship, tale type ATU 613, "Truth and Falsehood", is "widespread in Hungarian speaking areas" and traceable to antiquity.

The narrative action of tale type ATU 554, remarks folklorist Hans-Jörg Uther, is developed by the aid of the helpful animals. Each of the animals comes from one element: water, earth and air.

=== Motifs ===
Gottlieb Stier interpreted the hero's name, Ferkö, as related to the Hungarian word for wolf, farkas.

The motif of crippling the hero is found in various other tales, such as "True and Untrue" and "The Prince and the Princess in the Forest". "True and Untrue" also has trickery about food; "The Three Treasures of the Giants" is similar, although the hero has no food because he does not wish to take it from his poor mother.

The animals who help after being spared are common – as in "The Two Brothers", or "The Queen Bee", or "The Death of Koschei the Deathless" – and in "The Gold-bearded Man" and "Ferdinand the Faithful and Ferdinand the Unfaithful", they help with envious, false claims. These envious claims are common in other tales, without the beasts, such as "Boots and the Troll", "Thirteenth", "Esben and the Witch" and "Dapplegrim".

In many tales, the king who insists on the task is punished. These include "The Gifts of the Magician", "Ferdinand the Faithful and Ferdinand the Unfaithful", "The Firebird and Princess Vasilisa", and "King Fortunatus's Golden Wig".

== Variants ==
In a Slavic variant, Morning-Dew, three brothers go on a journey, the two elders insist the youngest share his bread with them, promising to share theirs with him later. Later, the elder brothers promise to give their bread if the youngest put out their eyes. He does so and his brothers abandon him in the mountains. Fortunately, he listens to two vila saying that the morning dew can restore one's sight. He cures himself with the morning dew and uses it on a blind mouse, a blind bee and a blind dove, and they promise to help him in the future. The youth goes to another city to seek service, and his brothers recognize him. Fearing their brother telling the truth, they lie to his master about his being able to perform impossible tasks, which he does with the help of the mouse, the bee and the dove.
