= How the Dragon Was Tricked =

Greek fairy tale

How the Dragon was Tricked

Folk tale
- Name: How the Dragon was Tricked
- Aarne–Thompson grouping: ATU 328
- Country: Greece
- Published in: The Pink Fairy Book

How the Dragon was Tricked is a Greek fairy tale collected by Johann Georg von Hahn in Griechische und Albanesische Märchen with the title Von dem Schönen und vom Drakos ("About the Beauty and the Drakos"), and sourced from Kukuli. Andrew Lang included it in The Pink Fairy Book. It is Aarne-Thompson type 328, the boy steals the giant's treasures.

== Synopsis ==
An older brother was jealous of his younger brother and one day tied him to a tree to be rid of him. An old, humpbacked shepherd saw him and asked him why; the younger brother said it was to straighten out his back, and persuaded the shepherd to be tied there in his place. Then he drove off the sheep. He persuaded a horse boy and a driver of oxen to come with him. He played many tricks and became famous.

The king captured him, said he had earned death, and promised to spare him if he brought him the dragon's flying horse. He went and tried three times to steal the horse. Each time it neighed, alerting the dragon, but the third time the dragon, annoyed at being awoken, beat the horse. The fourth time, the horse did not neigh, the boy led him out, and once out, he mounted and rode off, taunting the dragon.

The king then demanded the dragon's bed coverings. The boy went and tried to hook the blanket during the night, but the dragon said his wife was hogging them, and pulled them, pulling the boy down. The dragon tied him and told his wife to cook him the next day while he went to church. When he returned, they would eat him. The dragoness untied him to cut his throat more easily, and the boy cut her throat and threw her into the oven. He stole the bedcoverings and returned to the king.

The king then demanded the dragon itself. The boy demanded two years to let his beard grow as a disguise, and the king agreed. When the two years were up, the youth changed clothing with a beggar and found the dragon making a box, in order to trap him in it. The youth said that the box was too small. The dragon assured him that it was big enough even for himself and wriggled in to show him. The youth clapped on the top and told him to see if the youth would be able to escape. The dragon tried as hard as it could, and could not get out.

The youth brought him back to the king. The king wanted to see the dragon. He was careful enough to open a hole too small for the dragon to escape, but not enough to keep it from biting him and swallowing him whole. The youth married the king's daughter and became king in his place.

== Analysis ==
American folklorist D. L. Ashliman classified the tale, according to the international Aarne-Thompson-Uther Index, as type AaTh 328, "The Boy Steals the Ogre's Treasures".

== See also ==
- The Grateful Beasts
- Esben and the Witch
- Buttercup
- The Master Thief
- Hop o' My Thumb
