= Corvetto (fairy tale) =

Fairy tale by Giambattista Basile (1636)

"Corvetto" is an Italian literary fairy tale written by Giambattista Basile in his 1634 work, the "Pentamerone".

It is Aarne-Thompson type 531. Other tales of this type include "The Firebird and Princess Vasilisa", "Ferdinand the Faithful and Ferdinand the Unfaithful", "King Fortunatus's Golden Wig". Another, literary variant is Madame d'Aulnoy's "La Belle aux cheveux d'or", or "The Story of Pretty Goldilocks".

== Synopsis ==
Corvetto served a king loyally and was favored by him. Envious fellow servants tried to slander him, but failed. An ogre lived nearby, with a magnificent horse, and finally the servants said that the king should send Corvetto to steal it. Corvetto went, and jumped on the horse. It shouted to its master, who chased after them with wild animals (one of them being a Werewolf), but Corvetto rode it off. The king was even more pleased, and the other servants told him to send Corvetto after the ogre's tapestry. Corvetto went, hid under the ogres' bed, and at night stole both the tapestries and the counterpane from the bed (causing the ogre and ogress to argue about who hogged them). He dropped them from a window and fled back to the king.

The servants then persuaded him to send Corvetto to get for him the entire palace of the ogres. He went and talked with the ogress, offering to help her. She asked him to split wood for her. He used the axe on her neck. Then he dug a deep pit in the doorway and covered it. He lured the ogre and his friends into it, stoned them to death, and gave the king the palace.

== Analysis ==
=== Tale type ===
The tale is classified, in the international Aarne-Thompson-Uther Index, as tale type ATU 328, "The Boy Steals the Ogre’s Treasure (Corvetto)". According to Hans-Jörg Uther, Corvetto (Night III, tale 7) is a literary attestation of the tale type.

Nancy Canepa indexed it as type 328, "The Boy Steals the Ogre's Treasure", and type 1525, "The Master Thief". and American folklorist D. L. Ashliman classified it as type 531, "Ferdinand the Faithful and Ferdinand the Unfaithful" and type 1525, "The Master Thief". Renato Aprile, editor of the Italian Catalogue of Tales of Magic, classifies Corvetto as Italian type AT 328, Tridicino ("Thirteenth"): thirteen brothers take shelter in an ogre's house who threatens to devour them, but they escape to a castle; however, the hero's elder brothers lie that their sibling can return to the ogre's lair to steal his objects (usually three) and, lastly, to bring the ogre himself.

=== Motifs ===
In some tales, the hero has no blood relation to his rivals, and in others the hero is helped by a magic horse. In the latter case, the story develops as type AT 531. According to Aprile, this occurs in a group of "typically Sicilian" variants.

== See also ==
- Boots and the Troll
- Dapplegrim
- Esben and the Witch
- The Gifts of the Magician
- Thirteenth
