= Dapplegrim =

Norwegian fairy tale

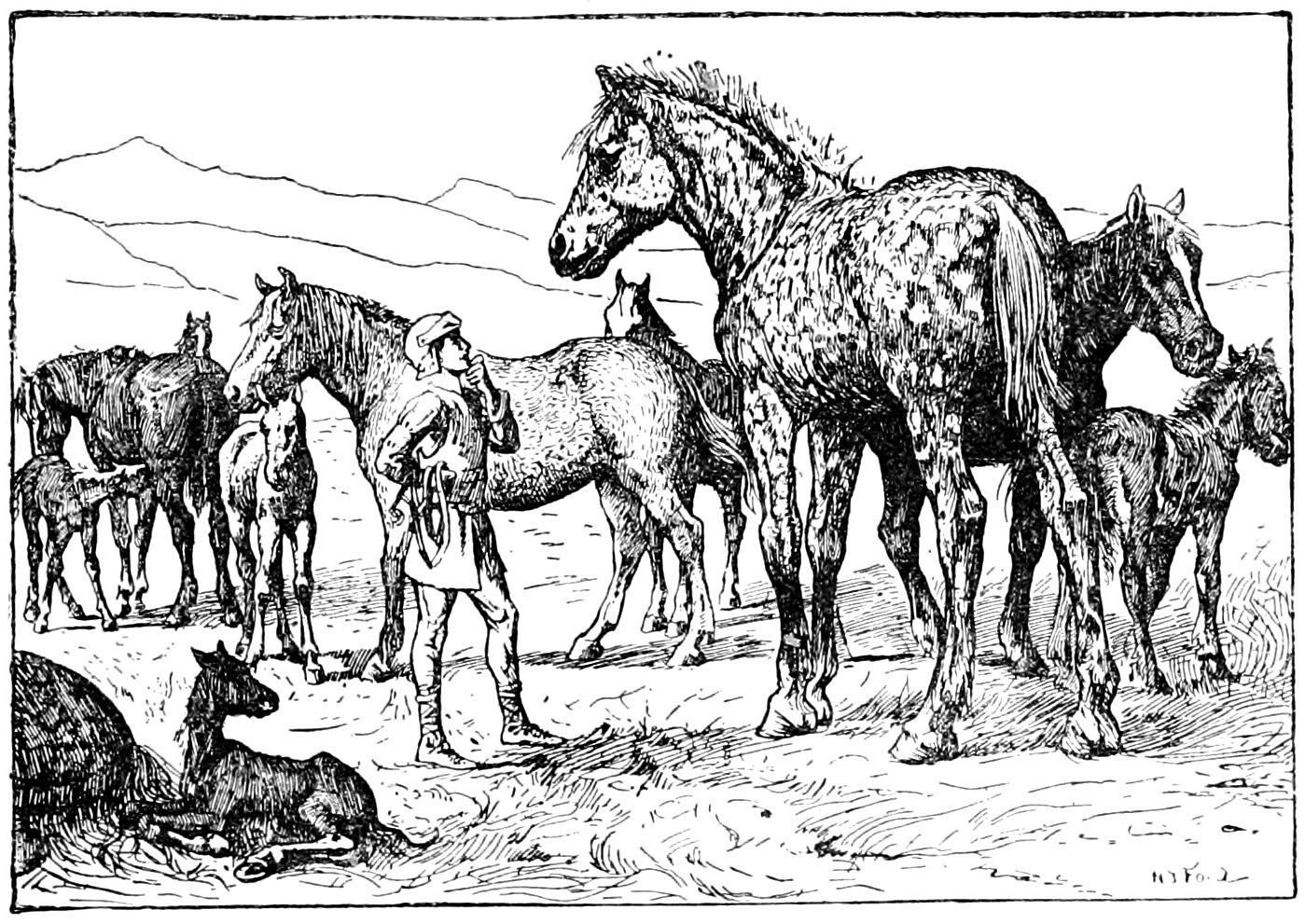
- Boots, the knight, chooses the best horse in the harras. Illustration by Henry Justice Ford for Andrew Lang's The Red Fairy Book (1890).

Folk tale
- Name: Dapplegrim
- Also known as: Grimsborken
- Aarne–Thompson grouping: ATU 531, "The Clever Horse"
- Region: Norway
- Published in: Norske Folkeeventyr, by Asbjørnsen and Moe
- Related: The Story of Pretty Goldilocks; Ferdinand the Faithful and Ferdinand the Unfaithful; The Firebird and Princess Vasilisa; Corvetto; King Fortunatus's Golden Wig

Dapplegrim (Norwegian: Grimsborken) is a Norwegian fairy tale collected by Peter Christen Asbjørnsen and Jørgen Moe in their Norske Folkeeventyr. Andrew Lang included it in The Red Fairy Book (1890).

== Plot ==
A man, the youngest of twelve children, decides to wander off from his rich parents' house. Upon his return, he finds his parents have died and his brothers have shared all the lands among themselves, thinking he was dead. They offer him twelve mares as compensation, and when he goes to check them he finds all of them have a foal, and that one has yet another foal, a very sleek dapple-gray one. When he praises the beauty of the foal, it replies back and tells him that he'll be more splendid if the young man would go and kill all the other foals and let him feed on all the mares' milk for a year. The young man decides to heed to this advice and finds him a year later being quite large and sleeker. The colt tells him that he would be even more splendid if the young man were to go again and kill the twelve foals that have been born since, which the young man agrees to do. Yet again he returns the next year, finding the horse being huge and incredibly sleek, and yet again the horse asks him to kill the new foals and let him have the mares' milk for one more year, to which the young man agrees again. At last, he returns a year later to find the horse impossibly large and radiant, and the horse decides then to go with him.

The brothers are surprised that he has such a horse, and on the horse's advice, they give him horseshoes and a golden saddle and a golden bridle, in exchange for the twelve mares and their new foals. Then, the man rides the horse, whose name is Dapplegrim, to the kingdom's capital. The king's daughter had been kidnapped by a troll and the king had promised her hand and half his kingdom to whoever could rescue her. Dapplegrim promises the man that he'll help, but the man needs to request the best food and stables for the horse. The king, upon seeing the man riding on such a superb horse, agrees. Envious knights urge the king to send the man to rescue the princess or else he should be killed, to which the man reluctantly agrees. Dapplegrim asks him to request iron and silver horseshoes, and after obtaining them takes him to the troll's cave on top of an almost vertical stone wall on a hill, and manages to ride up, the man putting the princess on top of the horse before the troll can even stand up.

Upon his triumphant return with the princess, however, the ill-advised king tells him that in order to marry the princess he needs to get rid of the ridge that prevents the sun from shining in his hall. Dapplegrim again says he can help, but the man needs to request even heavier silver and iron horseshoes. Then the horse jumps on top of the ridge until it finally sinks. Once again, however, the king asks for something else: the man needs to procure an equally splendid horse for the bride, or else he will be killed. Dapplegrim agrees to help again, and this time demands even larger horseshoes, as well as an assortment of things, for they must go to hell where another horse like it lies. After a number of adventures, Dapplegrim fights the hellish horse and defeats it, at which point the man puts the bridle on it and they return together, the second horse happening to be identical to Dapplegrim in every single detail.

Yet, the king has still one more trial for the man: the princess must hide twice and be found, and then the man must hide twice and the princess be unable to find him. The princess transforms first into a duck, and then into a loaf of bread, but on both occasions Dapplegrim tells the man, so he finds her. When it is his turn, the man transforms into a tick and hides in Dapplegrim's nostril, and the second time into a clump of dirt hiding in between the horse's hooves and its horseshoes. The princess is unable to find him, due to Dapplegrim not allowing her to come close. At last, the man and the princess ride in their horses to the church to get married.

== Translations and adaptations ==
The tale was published in a compilation of world folktales by illustrator Katharine Pyle in 1920. The tale was also translated and published by George Webbe Dasent in 1903.

The tale was translated into French with the title Le Cheval Prodige ("The Prodigious Horse").

Joseph Jacobs inserted the horse Dapplegrim as the giant's mount in his reconstructed protoform of the Norwegian tale "The Master Maid", published in Europa's Fairy Book (1916).

== Analysis ==
=== Tale type ===
Grimsborken is the name of tale type 531, in Norwegian sources, according to scholar Ørnulf Hodne's The Types of the Norwegian Folktale. The type registers 39 variants across Norwegian sources.

The Aarne–Thompson–Uther tale types ATU 530, 531 (The Clever Horse) and 533 (The Speaking Horsehead) fall under the umbrella of Supernatural Helper in the folk/fairy tale index and pertain to a cycle of stories in which a magical horse helps the hero or heroine by giving advice and/or instructing him/her.

=== Motifs ===
George Webbe Dasent stated that the character of Dapplegrim is reminiscent of sagas and tales where hero and steed share a bond of trust.

Peter Christen Asbjørnsen and Jørgen Moe collected a second Norwegian variant of the ATU 531 tale type, titled Gullslottet som hang i luften (English: "The Golden Castle that Hung in the Air").

== See also ==
- Boots and the Troll
- Corvetto (fairy tale)
- Esben and the Witch
- The Gold-bearded Man
- The Little Girl Sold with the Pears
- The Three Aunts
- Thirteenth
