= The Gold-bearded Man =

Hungarian fairy tale

Folk tale
- Name: The Gold-bearded Man
- Aarne–Thompson grouping: ATU 502, "The Wild Man as Helper"
- Country: Hungary
- Region: Nagykőrös
- Published in: Elegyes gyüjtések Magyarország és Erdély különbözo részeibol by László Arany (1872); The Crimson Fairy Book

The Gold-bearded Man (Hungarian: Az aranszakállú embör) is a Hungarian fairy tale collected by Laszlo Arany. It was translated and published as Der goldbärtige Mann by Elisabeth Rona-Sklárek in Ungarische Volksmährchen. Andrew Lang included it in The Crimson Fairy Book.

== Origin ==
The tale was collected in dialectal form in the region of Nagykőrös.

== Synopsis ==
A dying king asked of his queen that she would never remarry, but rather devote the rest of her life to caring for their only son. She promised to do as he requested, but no sooner was her husband dead than she remarried and had her new husband made king instead of her son. The stepfather was a wicked man and treated his stepson very cruelly.

By the castle was a brook filled with milk rather than water. It had plenty for everyone, but the new king forbade anyone to take the milk. The guards noticed a gold-bearded wild man taking buckets of milk in the morning and then strangely vanishing. The king came to see for himself. He wondered if he could ever capture such a man, and many attempts failed. One day, an old soldier told him to leave bread, bacon, and drugged wine for the man; he would eat, drink, and fall asleep. Then they could catch him. The plan succeeded and the king put the man in a cage. After a month had passed, the king had to go to war. He told his stepson to feed the man but not free him or his fate would be terrible.

The prince accidentally shot an arrow into the cage, and the gold-bearded man refused to give it back unless he freed him. After much pleading, the prince was convinced. The gold-bearded man promised to repay him a thousand-fold and vanished. The prince decided that running away could not be more dangerous than staying and left. As he went along, he met a wood dove. He was on the verge of shooting it when it implored him not to because its two children would starve. He spared the dove, who said that it would find a way to repay him for his act of mercy. The prince continued on, eventually meeting a duck and later a stork. Both times the same thing happened as had with the wood dove.

He met with two soldiers and they traveled together in search of work. A king hired the soldiers as coachmen and the prince as his companion. The jealous soldiers told him the prince had claimed that if he were made the king's steward, he could ensure that no grain was lost from the king's store; if he set the prince to separate wheat and barley, it would show what his boasting was worth. The king had two enormous sacks mixed and ordered the prince to separate them. The wood dove, who was the king of the wood doves, had his fellow doves sort them. The king appointed him steward.

This made the soldiers more jealous. They then told the king that the prince had claimed that were he in charge of the royal treasures, he would ensure that none were lost. If the king had a ring from the princess's finger thrown in the stream, it would show what his boasting was worth. The king did so and the duck, who was the king of the ducks, had his ducks find it. The king appointed him in charge of his treasures.

The soldiers now claimed that the prince had said he knew of a child who could speak every language and play every musical instrument. The king thought this was magic, which he had tried to learn, and ordered the prince to produce the child, as a third task or be dragged to death. The stork brought the child to him. The king married him to his daughter and asked how he had done it. The prince told him and the king had the soldiers driven away with whips.

== Analysis ==
=== Tale type ===
The Hungarian National Catalogue of Folktales (MNK) classifies the tale as type AaTh 502, Az aranyszakállú ember ("The Man with the Golden Beard"): a king captures or is brought as his prisoner a man with golden beard; the king's son throws a ball or arrow on the golden-bearded man's cage and lets it escape; the prince is expelled to the forest, but meets the same golden-bearded man who promises to be his servant. The Hungarian type corresponds to type ATU 502, "The Wild Man as a Helper", of the international Aarne-Thompson-Uther Index.

=== Motifs ===
Elisabeth Rona-Sklárek noted that in this tale the theme of the "wild man" appeared in connection with the theme of the "grateful animals".

"The Hairy Man" and "Iron John" also feature the freeing of a strange wild man prisoner as the start of the story.

The sparing of the animals, and their aid, also feature in "The Three Princes and their Beasts", "The Two Brothers", and "The Queen Bee".

"The Grateful Beasts" and "Ferdinand the Faithful and Ferdinand the Unfaithful" combine the animal motif with that of the hero having to match someone's lying brags, which is also found without it, in "Boots and the Troll", "Thirteenth", "Esben and the Witch", and "Dapplegrim".
