= The Three Treasures of the Giants =

The Three Treasures of the Giants is a Slavonic fairy tale collected by Louis Léger in Contes Populaires Slaves. Andrew Lang included it in The Orange Fairy Book. Ruth Manning-Sanders included it as "King Johnny" in A Book of Giants.

== Synopsis ==
A man had three sons. When he was dying, he told his oldest that he would inherit, but must be kind to his mother and his younger brothers; he then gave the older two more advice, and told the youngest son that while he was not clever, he had a kind heart and should follow it.

After he died, the sons set out to seek their fortune; the older two wanted to leave the youngest behind, but their mother said there was nothing for him there. The older two carried great sacks of food, the youngest nothing, and the older two grew angry that they had to carry the weight. The youngest rebuked them for claiming not to want to burden their mother, when they took all her food. They shared with him. At night, they ate on their own, and the family of the woodcutter shared with the youngest, so that he ate better than they did. They set out to lose him in the wood and found a castle. It was empty of people but had a room filled with copper coins, another with silver, and a third with gold, and the two older emptied their sacks at each room to fill them up. When the youngest ate the food they had dropped, they drove him off and returned to their mother with the money.

The youngest went back to the castle and made a bag of his jacket to take some gold. The giants returned and caught him. They told him they would spare him if he guarded their treasures, and gave him a table to feed himself at; if he knocked on it, it gave him a feast. One day he grew tired of guarding and went off, taking the table. He found a hermit and gave him a feast; the hermit offered to trade the table for a trumpet that would bring him an army when he blew it. The youngest son agreed, but when he went on his way, he regretted it, blew the trumpet, and had the soldiers take back the table. He went on and found another hermit; after another feast, the hermit offered him a bag that contained as many castles as he liked. He agreed, but again had the soldiers take back the table.

Going back home, he stayed with his brothers a time, and the secret leaked out. The king borrowed the table, and tried to substitute a false one. The youngest son used the trumpet and the king offered to give back the table and let him marry the princess. He agreed. When he produced a castle to live in, the king said he was old and weak and made him king.

=== Ending for variants ===
In Lang's variant, the youngest son lived to be old and happy, but his descendants were too proud to look after the treasure and so were overcome.

In Manning-Sanders's variants, the hermits arrived and demanded the table; because they could not both take it to their hermitages, the princess proposed that they remain at the castle and eat there every day. This made the son feel guilty, so he went back to offer it to the giants who told them they did not want it because it made food for men.

== See also ==
- The Grateful Beasts
- True and Untrue
