= The Gifts of the Magician =

Finnish fairy tale

Folk tale
- Name: The Gifts of the Magician
- Country: Finland
- Published in: The Crimson Fairy Book

The Gifts of the Magician (Finnish: Hiiden lahjat) is a Finnish fairy tale, first published by Eero Salmelainen. This tale, in particular, is actually titled Paholaisen antamat soittoneuwot [soittoneuvot] ("Musical Instruments Given by the Devil"). It was translated into German by Emmy Schreck as Die Gaben des Unholds. (Note: Emmy Schreck explained that the German word Unholds translated Finnish paholainen ("The Evil One, the devil").) Andrew Lang included it in The Crimson Fairy Book (1903), listing his source as Finnische Mahrchen.

== Origin ==
Emmy Schreck indicated the tale originated from Liperi.

== Synopsis ==
A widower forbade his only son to shoot at birds. One day, he shot at and hit one, and chased the wounded bird until he became lost in the forest. When night fell, he saw a magician being chased by wolves. He shot the largest wolf, which put all the rest to flight. The magician gave him shelter during the night. In the morning, he could not be woken. The magician left to hunt. The boy woke up and talked with the maid servant, who told him to ask for the horse in the third stall as a reward. When he did, the magician tried to persuade him to ask for anything else instead, but finally gave it to him, along with a zither, a fiddle, and a flute, telling him to play each one in turn if he were in danger.

The horse warned him not to go back to his father, who would only beat him. He rode the horse on, to the king's city, where everyone admired the horse. The horse told him to tell the king to stable it with the royal horses; then they would grow as beautiful as it. This worked, but made the old groom envious of the boy. He told the king that the boy had claimed to be able to find the king's old war-charger, which had been lost in the woods. The king ordered the boy to find it in three days. The horse told him to demand a hundred dead oxen, cut to pieces, and they rode off. At the horse's instructions, he bridled the third horse that came to them, and then distracted the magician's raven by throwing the meat behind them. The groom claimed that he had said he could restore the king's vanished wife. The horse told him to ride it to the river, where it would dive in and assume her true form; she was the queen. This pleased the king, but the groom told him that the boy had threatened to take the throne, and the king sentenced him to be hanged. The boy played the zither, and the hangman had to dance all day. The next day, everyone came to see him hanged, the boy played the fiddle, and the whole crowd danced. The third day, the king wanted to refuse to let him play the flute, but the crowd persuaded him. The king insisted on being tied to a tree first, but he still danced, until his back was raw, and then the magician appeared. He destroyed the gallows and killed the king. The people chose the boy for their king, and the old groom drowned himself, because the boy might have been poor all his life without his interference.

== Translations ==
William Henry Jones and Lewis L. Kropf gave an abridged summary of the tale, translating the instruments as a kantele, (Note: Emmy Schreck explained that a kantele was a musical instrument from the Finnish people similar to a zither.) a fiddle, and a flute.

French author Eugéne Beauvois translated the tale as Les dons du Diable ("The gifts from the Devil"), where the instruments are a harpe, a violon and a flûte.

== Analysis ==
Eero Salmelainen compared the tale with Norwegian tale Grimsborken ("Dapplegrim") and French literary fairy tale The Story of Pretty Goldilocks, both catalogued as ATU 531.

The dispossessing of the king is found in The Grateful Beasts, Ferdinand the Faithful and Ferdinand the Unfaithful, The Firebird and Princess Vasilisa, and King Fortunatus's Golden Wig.
