= Kisa the Cat =

Icelandic fairy tale

Kisa the Cat is an Icelandic fairy tale collected in Neuisländischen Volksmärchen. Andrew Lang included an adapted version in The Brown Fairy Book.

== Synopsis ==
A queen had a cat. One day, she lamented that the cat had a kitten but she had no child. The cat consulted a fairy, and soon after, the queen had a princess. The baby was very fond of the kitten, but one day, the kitten vanished and could not be found. Many years later, the princess was playing with a ball and threw it further than usual; then she heard a voice calling her, and saying she was Kisa her sister. Ingibjorg had not remembered what had happened when she was a baby, and Kisa tried to persuade her when Ingibjorg's women arrived, and Kisa left. Ingibjorg told her mother, who informed her it was true.

The next day, Ingibjorg went to the forest, but was kidnapped by a giant. When she began to cry, the giant, to give her something to cry about, cut off her feet. Kisa came and brought a cart to carry her off. Kisa then went to the giants' home and tipped salt into their broth. This made them thirsty, and when they went to the river to drink, Kisa stole the feet, put them back on the princess, and brought her home. Then she left.

Ingibjorg was despondent that Kisa had left without a word. The king resolved to marry her off to hearten her. He summoned handsome princes, and Ingibjorg chose one. Then Kisa reappeared and asked to sleep at the foot of her bed on her wedding night. Ingibjorg agreed, and in the morning, Kisa had turned into a beautiful princess. She told how she and her mother had been enchanted by a spiteful fairy, and she lived in their castle until she married a prince herself.

== See also ==
- Prince Ring
