= Thirteenth (fairy tale) =

Italian Fairy Story

Folk tale
- Name: Thirteenth
- Also known as: Tridicinu
- Aarne–Thompson grouping: ATU 328
- Country: Italy
- Published in: Italian Popular Tales

"Thirteenth" (Sicilian: Tridicinu) is an Italian fairy tale originally collected by Sicilian folklorist Giuseppe Pitrè and published by Thomas Frederick Crane in Italian Popular Tales. It is Aarne-Thompson type 328, "The Boy Steals Ogre's Treasure".

== Synopsis ==
A mother of thirteen sons motivates them to become fast runners, by arranging a competition each night: whoever reaches home first will enjoy the soup made from herbs their father has gathered. The youngest son, called Thirteenth, always wins, and as a result his brothers envy him and try to get rid of him. One day, the king promises a prize of gold for the hero who manages to steal the blanket of a giant in the vicinity. The brothers approach the king and tell him that Thirteenth boasts to be able to perform the feat. The king then asks that Thirteenth be brought before him, and demands that he do what he has bragged about. Thirteen, who never has pretended to be a monster slayer, protests, but to no avail. He has no choice but to head for the house of the giant.

The monster is out, and only his wife is at home, but Thirteenth sneaks inside and hides under the bed. At night, the giant returns, eats his supper and goes to bed, where he tells his wife he can smell a human, and wants to eat it. The giantess thinks he is stupid; there are no humans around, so the giant goes to sleep. During the night Thirteenth pulls at the blanket to try to steal it, but the giant is stirred. The boy mews like a cat, and the giant is calmed, and falls asleep again. Thirteenth then seizes the blanket quickly and runs out. The giant wakes again, and notices the sound of the thief's steps.

After some time the king issues another reward if someone will bring him the giant's horse. Thirteenth presents himself and asks for a silk ladder and a bag of cakes. At night he approaches the giant's stable. The horse neighs on seeing him, but Thirteenth calms it by offering it cake, and manages to ride it all the way to the king.

Then the king declares that he wants the giant's bolster. Thirteenth protests, since the bolster is full of little bells, which makes it impossible to steal it and sneak away unnoticed. The king insists and Thirteenth departs. He creeps under the ogre's bed and waits for the couple to retire. At midnight the couple is asleep, and Thirteenth stretches out his hand for the bolster, but the bells chime and the giant wakes. The giant's wife believes that it is the wind that has stirred them, and the giant seemingly agrees and goes back to sleep. In reality he is pretending, since he now feels that it is time to catch the burglar. When Thirteenth stretches out his hand for the bolster again, the giant seizes his arm.

To punish Thirteenth for his three crimes, the giant imprisons him in a barrel, fattening him up in order to eat him. Every few days the ogre feels Thirteenth's finger, to measure the fattening process. The boy is steadily becoming fatter, and Thirteenth realises that his finger will reveal that he is fat enough for the giant to eat. He thus presents a mouse tail instead of the finger for the giant, who cannot tell, and believes the boy is not ready for slaughter. A few days later the giant wants to measure again, and this time Thirteenth uses a spindle to the same end. By the end of the month, Thirteenth cannot find anything else to use as a substitute for his finger, and had no choice but to stick it out. The giant is satisfied that the boy is fat enough, and calls his wife to prepare the boy for dinner, while he invites their relatives for the feast.

When the stove is heated, the giantess releases Thirteenth from the barrel, asking him to help her prepare a lamb for dinner. But Thirteenth understands that he is in fact the lamb, and tricks the giantess to fall into the oven. When she is cooked, Thirteenth carves her up and serves her legs as a meal; and places her upper body in the bed, with strings attached to the head and hands, covered under a blanket. When the relatives arrive, the giant finds the table ready, and goes to the bedroom to invite his wife to dinner: Thirteenth answers no, by pulling the strings, but one of the relatives come to look for them, and notices that something is not right with the giantess. Thirteenth escapes from under the bed and manages to steal the bolster and reach the king.

The king wants Thirteenth to complete his exploits by bringing back the giant himself. Thirteenth orders a very strong chest and disguises himself as a monk. At the giant's home, he pretends to be a man hunting for the evil Thirteenth to capture him in the chest. The monk asks the giant to test the strength of the chest, thus tricking the giant to climb into the chest. Thirteenth brings the giant to the king, who imprisons the giant, and rewards Thirteenth with all the riches and honour of the kingdom.

== Analysis ==
=== Tale type ===
According to scholar Jack Zipes, the tale is classified in the international Aarne-Thompson-Uther Index as type ATU 328, "The Boy Steals the Ogre's Treasure". The title of the Sicilian tale, Tridicinu, is also the name of tale type ATU 328 in the Italian index of tales of magic. In the Italian tale type, thirteen brothers take shelter in an ogre's house who threatens to devour them, but they escape to a castle; however, the hero's elder brothers lie that their sibling can return to the ogre's lair to steal his objects (usually three) and, lastly, to bring the ogre himself.

According to Kurt Ranke, some scholars (Grimm Brothers, Johannes Bolte and Waldemar Liungman) have noticed great similarities between tale types ATU 328 and ATU 531, even proposing some deeper connection between both types, since they also appear in combination with each other due to their narrative contents. (Note: Likewise, according to Russian folklorist Lev Barag, types 531 and 328 are frequently contaminated with each other in Ukraine and Belarusian variants.) Liungman, for example, argued that type ATU 531 originated type ATU 328.

=== Motifs ===
In some tales, the hero has no blood relation to his rivals, and in others the hero is helped by a magic horse. In the latter case, the story develops as type AT 531. According to Aprile, this occurs in a group of "typically Sicilian" variants.

==== The hero's name ====
According to Stith Thompson's second revision of the tale type index, tale type 328 contains the motif L10.1.1, "«Thirteenth» name of victorious youngest son". In addition, German scholar Kurt Ranke, in Enzyklopädie des Märchens, noted that in Yugoslavian, Rhaeto-Romance, Italian and Greek variants, the hero is known as some variation of the number "Thirteenth". According to the Italian Catalogue of Tales of Magic, by Renato Aprile, the hero's name varies in the spelling of their name, mostly referring to the number thirteenth: Tredicino, Tredsin, Tredzì, Tredisin, Tredisìn, Tredecine, Tridicinu, Tredicenne, Tredicineddu, Tridicicchi, Tridicillo, Tredecicchje, Triticinu, Triricinu, and Tredighinu. In other tales, his name refers to number eleven (e.g., Undicino), thirty (e.g., Trentino) or one hundred (e.g., Centino).

== Variants ==
=== Switzerland ===
In a Swiss Alpine tale published by Fritz Müller-Guggenbühl with the title Tredeschin, the titular Tredeschin ("Little Thirteen") is the thirteenth son of a large family that lives in "Swiss Egandine, in the mountains of Graubünden". Tredeschin goes to Paris and finds work at the stables of the king of France. Eventually, the king's chamberlain notices the boy's singing prowess and invites him to play at the king's table to lift his spirits. Despite his talent, the boy cannot cheer up the king, for he is sullen over the loss of his precious possessions to the Empire of the Turk: his favourite white horse and his sky-blue brocaded quilt. Through cunning and disguise, Tredeschin obtains the king's items. Lastly, the king agrees to marry him to his daughter if he brings the Turk's talking parrot.

== See also ==
- Boots and the Troll
- Corvetto (fairy tale)
- Dapplegrim
- Esben and the Witch
- The Gold-bearded Man
- The Grateful Beasts
- Hansel and Gretel
- How the Dragon was Tricked
- Jack and the Beanstalk
- The Little Girl Sold with the Pears
- The Three Aunts
