= The Tale of the Shifty Lad, the Widow's Son =

Scottish fairy tale

Folk tale
- Name: The Tale of the Shifty Lad, the Widow's Son
- Also known as: The Shifty Lad
- Country: Scotland
- Published in: Popular Tales of the West Highlands; The Lilac Fairy Book
- Related: The Master Thief

The Tale of the Shifty Lad, the Widow's Son is a Scottish fairy tale collected by John Francis Campbell in Popular Tales of the West Highlands. Andrew Lang included it, as The Shifty Lad in The Lilac Fairy Book. The tale was reprinted in Scottish Fairy and Folk Tales, by George Brisbane Scott Douglas.

== Origin ==
John Francis Campbell obtained the tale from a man named John Dewar, Arrochar, in 1860.

== Synopsis ==
A widow wanted her son to learn a trade. He insisted that he wanted to be a thief. She predicted he would end up hanging from a bridge. One day he did not go to church, and told her that the first trade she heard when she came out would be his. He came to the path and shouted "Thievery" in a disguised voice. She again predicted he would hang from the bridge but gave him to the Black Gallows Bird to learn the trade. The man taught him, and then said they must rob a man who had sold his cattle. On Halloween, they hid in the loft. The shifty lad went down and stirred up the cattle, sending people out; while they were gone, he stole nuts and sewed a leather hide to the thief. He cracked nuts, though the thief warned him he would be heard. He was heard, and the people came, and the thief ran off with the hide still attached. The people said he was stealing the hide and chased him. The Shifty Lad stole the gold and silver while they were gone, and brought them to the thief; they split them.

Soon, a tenant sent a man to get a wether to give as a wedding gift. The Shifty Lad bet his master that he could steal it from the man's back. When he was coming, the lad put a dirty shoe in his path; the man said that if he had the other one, he would clean this one and have a pair. The Shifty Lad ran ahead of his, and put the shoe in the way again. The man went back to get the other, and the lad took the wether and the shoes and won his bet. The tenant sent the same man after a kid. The lad bleated like the wether, and when the man searched for it, thinking to come back with both, the lad stole the kid. The third time, the tenant directed him to never let the wether go, and so he brought it home.

The shifty lad had his master hang him, and let him down when he kicked his legs. He praised it, and his master let him hang him, but the lad killed him. His wife was angry, and the lad fled. He took service with a wright who lived next to the king's storehouse, and broke into it to steal. The gifts persuaded the wright and his wife to let him. At the advice of the Seanagal, the king set a hogshead of pitch to catch the thief, and it caught the wright. The lad cut off his head to prevent their learning who he was.

The king displayed the body to discover who grieved at the sight, but when the wright's wife cried out, he cut his foot and pretended she cried over that. Then the body was hung from a tree for the same reason. The lad took a horse with casks of whiskey by them, as if he were hiding from the soldiers. They chased him, and he fled, leaving the horse. They took it back, found the whiskey, and became drunk. The lad took the body. The king sent a black pig about to dig up the body. When it rooted about the wright's house, the lad sent the soldiers inside to eat and drink while it searched. He killed the pig and buried it while they ate. The king sent men to discover where people had pig's flesh they could not account for; the lad killed the soldiers sent to his house, and then started a rumor that the soldiers meant to massacre them, so all the people killed the soldiers.

The Seanagal advised to give a ball, since the man would be the boldest and dance with the princess; when the lad did so, the Seanagal marked him with a black dot, but the lad saw it and marked the Seanagal himself with two and twenty other men with one. The king decided that he was beaten, and that he wanted so clever a man for his son-in-law. He had all the men with the black dots put in a room, and had a child give one an apple. The lad drew him with a shaving and a drone, and the child gave him the apple. They took the shaving and drone, but the child remembered them and still gave him the apple, so the shifty lad married the princess.

One day, while they walked on the bridge, the lad told the princess that his mother said he would hang from that bridge. She said that if he wished to go over the wall, she would hold him by her handkerchief. He did, and hanged there, but a cry went up about a fire, startling the princess. She let go. The lad fell and died.

== Analysis ==
Folklorist Joseph Jacobs, in his commentaries to the tale Jack, the Cunning Thief, mentions as parallel tale the story of The Shifty Lad.

Irish folklorist Patrick Kennedy also listed Jack, The Cunning Thief as another variant of the Shifty Lad and, by extension, of The Master Thief cycle of stories.

== See also ==
- The Master Thief
