= True and Untrue =

Norwegian fairy tale

True and Untrue is a Norwegian fairy tale collected by Asbjørnsen and Moe. It is Aarne-Thompson type 613, The Two Travelers: Truth and Falsehood.

== Synopsis ==
Two brothers were known as True and Untrue for their natures. They set out to seek their fortunes. Untrue persuaded True to let them both eat True's food first, and when that was eaten, refused True any of his. True said that it showed Untrue's nature, and Untrue gouged his brother's eyes out.

True fumbled along through the woods until he came to a lime tree. He decided to spend the night in it for fear of wild animals. A bear, wolf, fox, and hare met under it, because it was St. John's Eve. The bear said that the dew on the lime tree would cure the sight of the king, who was going blind; the wolf said that the king's daughter was deaf and mute because when she went to communion, she let a crumb fall, but if they caught the toad that had swallowed it, she would be cured; the fox told how the king could find a spring in his courtyard; and the hare told how a golden chain buried about the king's orchard kept it from bearing fruit.

At dawn, True rubbed his eyes with the dew, and regained his sight. He went to serve the king and put to use everything the animals had said, ending with restoring the princess's speech and hearing, at which the king married him to the princess and gave him half his kingdom.

At the wedding, a beggar came: Untrue. True gave him some food and told him to go sit in the lime tree, but when the animals came, they knew that someone had overheard all they said, so this year, they did not do more than say good night and part.

== Motifs ==
The plot of this story is similar to that of The Grateful Beasts, where the hero is crippled by companions, and because of this learns secrets. Numerous other variants exist, such as the Russian Правда и Кривда (Honesty and Dishonesty), and at least two French tales. In the latter, the hero is blinded in order for him and his companion to gather more money begging, and is abandoned when the companion believes he can manage without the burdensome cripple. By the time they meet again at the end of the story, the assumption turns out wrong, and the traitor is reduced to begging. In an Uzbek variant, instead of being blinded, the hero merely has his property stolen from him after accepting an offer of friendship. In many variants, the beasts (or demons), upon realizing they've been overheard earlier, check the area and, upon spotting the second man, tear him apart.

The contrasting results of the listening are similar to that of the Kind and Unkind Girls, as in such fairy tales as Mother Hulda, Diamonds and Toads, The Three Heads in the Well, Father Frost, and The Three Little Men in the Wood.

Such fairy tales as The Prince and the Princess in the Forest and The Three Treasures of the Giants use the motif of overhearing the necessary knowledge.
