= The Three Heads of the Well =

Story in Jacobs' English Fairy Tales

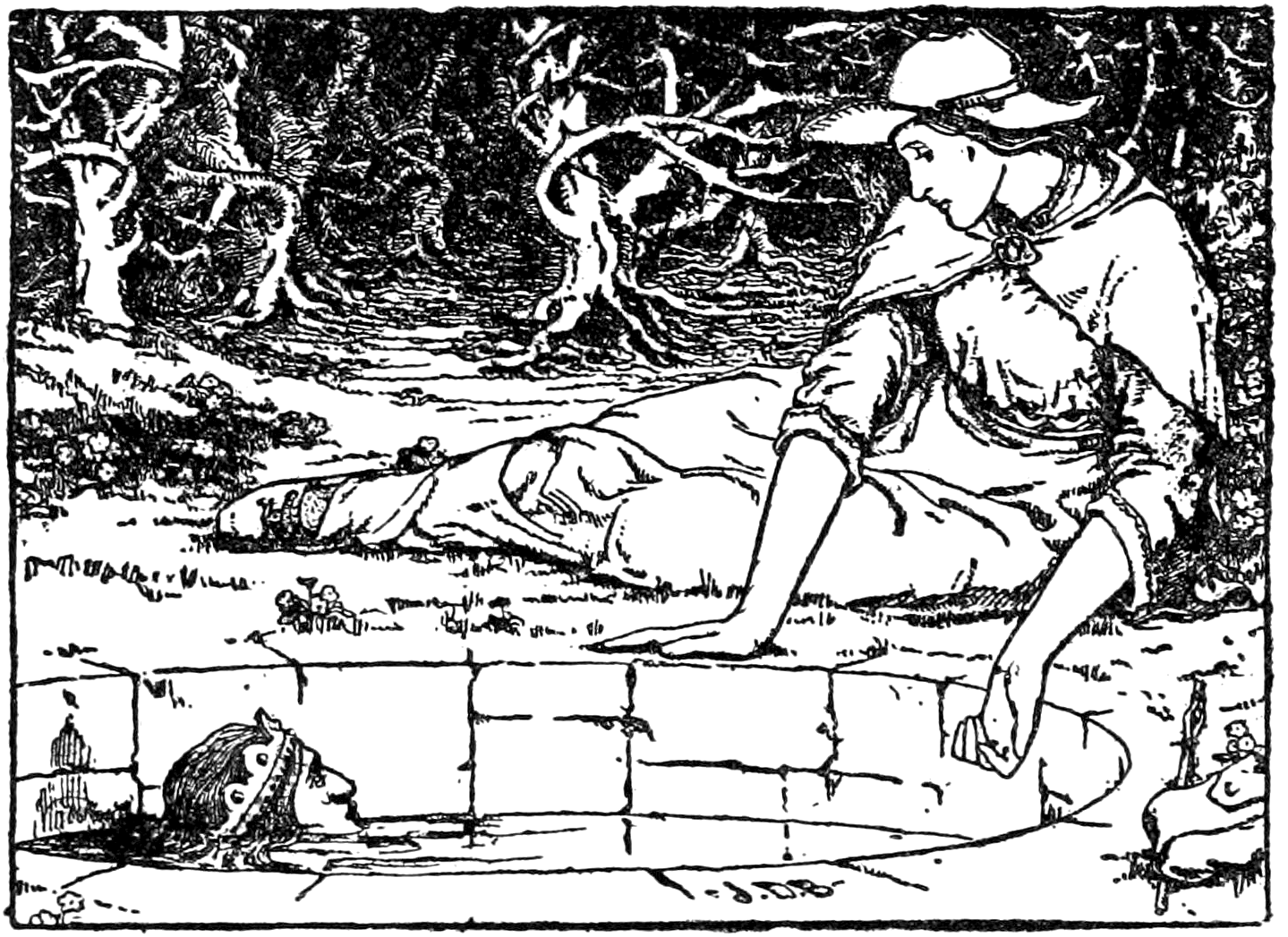
- The girl finds the head in the well.

Folk tale
- Name: The Three Heads of the Well
- Aarne–Thompson grouping: ATU 480, "The Kind and Unkind Girls"
- Region: England
- Published in: English Fairy Tales by Joseph Jacobs (1892)

The Three Heads in the Well is a fairy tale collected by Joseph Jacobs in English Fairy Tales.

It is Aarne-Thompson-Uther tale type ATU 480, The Kind and Unkind Girls. Others of this type include Shita-kiri Suzume, Diamonds and Toads, Mother Hulda, Father Frost, The Three Little Men in the Wood, The Enchanted Wreath, The Old Witch, and The Two Caskets. Literary variants include The Three Fairies and Aurore and Aimée.

== Publication ==
The tale is also known as The Three Golden Heads at the Well, The Three Golden Heads, and The Princess of Colchester.

== Synopsis ==
In the days before King Arthur, a king held his court in Colchester. He had a beautiful daughter by his beautiful wife. When his wife died, he married a hideous widow with a daughter of her own, for her riches, and his new wife set him against his daughter. His daughter begged leave to go and seek her fortune, and he permitted it, and his wife gave her brown bread, hard cheese, and a bottle of beer.

She goes on her way and sees an old man sitting on a stone. When he asks what she has, she tells him and offers him some. After they eat, he tells her how to get through a hedge, and that she will find three golden heads in a well there, and should do whatever they tell her.

The heads ask her to comb them and wash them, and after she does so, one says she shall be beautiful, the next that she will have a sweet voice, and the third that she shall be fortunate and queen to the greatest prince that reigns.

She goes on, and a king sees her and falls in love with her. They marry and go back to visit her father. Her stepmother is enraged that her stepdaughter and not her daughter gained all this, and sent her daughter on the same journey, with rich dresses, sugar, almonds, sweetmeats, and a bottle of rich wine. The daughter was rude to the old man, and slighted the three heads, and they curse her with leprosy, a harsh voice, and marriage to a cobbler.

She goes on. A cobbler offers to cure her leprosy and voice if she will marry him, and she agrees.

Her mother, finding she had married a cobbler, hangs herself, and the king gives his stepdaughter's husband a hundred pounds to quit the court and live elsewhere.

== Analysis ==
=== Tale type ===
The tale is classified in the international Aarne-Thompson-Uther Index as type ATU 480, "The Kind and Unkind Girls". The oldest record of this story exists in Old Wives' Tale, published in 1595, by author George Peele.

=== Motifs ===
==== The Heads at the Well ====
Scholar Warren Roberts names this group of stories "The Three Heads at the Well Group", and along other scholars, locates variants in England and in Anglo-American tradition, Scotland, Wales and Ireland, across Scandinavia (Norway, Denmark, Sweden and Swedish areas in Finland) and in Germany.

Folklorist Herbert Halpert, in turn, asserted that in American and English variants of the tale type, two narratives exist: one like The Three Heads of the Well (girl combs three heads at a well), and another he dubbed Long Leather Bag (heroine is kind to objects and animals, finds a leather bag in the witch's chimney).

== Variants ==
In a Romani tale titled The Little Crop-tailed Hen, a widow lives with her ugly hunchbacked daughter next to a widower with his beautiful daughter. The widow and the widower marry and the girls become step-sisters. One day, the widow sends her hunchbacked daughter to fetch water. The hunchbacked girl passes by a witch-woman's hut and is invited to go in, but insults the woman's little hut. She then goes to the well; three boars' heads come up in the water surface and ask the girl to wipe and comb them. The hunchbacked girl denies their request and brings home only muddy water. The beautiful girl walks the same path, but is courteous to the witch-woman and fulfills the boars' heads' request and fetches a bucket of clear water. This repeats twice more, until the boars' heads decide to punish the hunchbacked girl for her unkindness: they curse her to have half of her head bald, the other half filled with nits, and to be uglier than before. As for the girl, the boars' heads bless her with half of her hair of silver, the other of gold and for her to become even more beautiful.

== See also ==
- Kallo and the Goblins
- The Months
- True and Untrue
