= The Enchanted Princess =

German fairy tale collected by Ludwig Bechstein

The Enchanted Princess (German: Die verzauberte Prinzessin) is a German fairy tale collected by Ludwig Bechstein, first published in his book Deutsches Märchenbuch in 1845. It belongs to the ATU tale type 554, The Grateful Animals.

== Plot ==
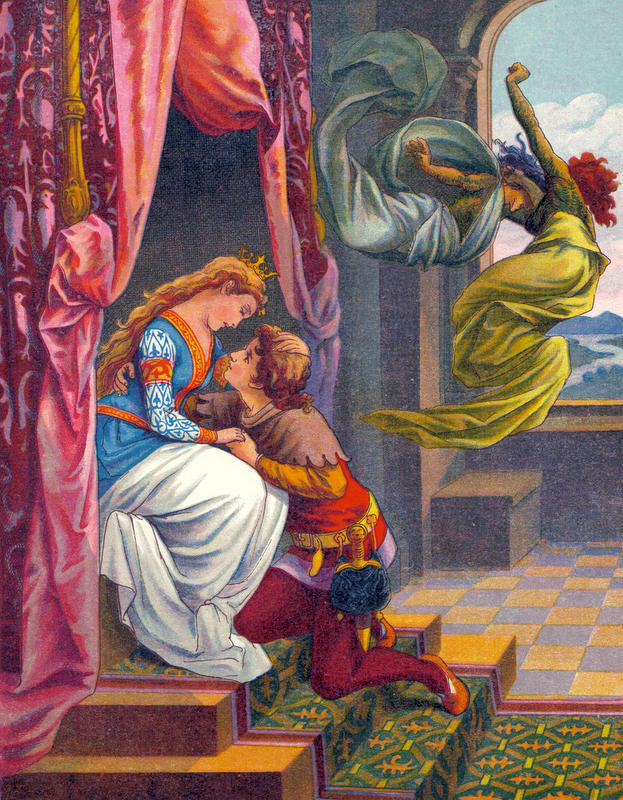
Illustration for Josephine Pollard's book Hours in Fairy Land, published in 1883

A poor cabinet-maker and his wife have two sons. They favour their elder son Hellmerich, who is arrogant and selfish, though they see him as brave and courageous, while the younger, Hans, who is good and kind-hearted, is considered by his parents as stupid.

One day, the cabinet-maker stops at an inn and overhears a conversation between two men saying that the princess has been kidnapped and placed under a spell by an evil sorcerer in his castle. Whoever seeks to rescue her must complete three hard tasks, but if he succeeds he will be given the princess's hand in marriage and win the sorcerer's treasures. The cabinet-maker tells his family and asks Hellmerich to attempt this challenge. The eldest son agrees and his father uses his last savings to buy him a horse, armour and a sword.

He rides through the forest surrounding the sorcerer's castle, trampling an anthill, killing some ducks near a pond, and destroying a beehive, leaving the bees homeless. He reaches the castle and bangs on the door impatiently. An old woman comes out and tells him to come back at nine o'clock. The next morning, he returns and the old woman appears with a basket full of seeds. She scatters the seeds over the grass and tells Hellmerich that, as his first task, he has one hour to put the seeds back in the basket. She leaves. Hellmerich sees this as a pointless task and goes for a walk instead. When he comes back, the woman is very indignant that he did not even attempt the task. Next, she throws twelve golden keys into a pond and gives him one hour to get them back. Once again, she leaves him. And again, Hellmerich goes for a walk instead. When he comes back, the woman is indignant with him once more. For the final task, she takes Hellmerich into the castle to a room with three veiled figures. He must select the one who is the princess. She warns him to think carefully and then leaves, giving him one hour to decide. Seeing this task as the most foolish one yet, Hellmerich hastily chooses the figure on the right, which is a huge, fire-breathing dragon, as is the one on the left. In the middle is the princess. The sorcerer orders the dragon to throw Hellmerich out of the window, killing him.

The cabinet-maker and his wife wait patiently for any news of Hellmerich. After a while, Hans decides to take up the challenge. His parents are unsupportive. Hans leaves without any help from them, as his father sold all he had for his elder brother. He takes the same path through the forest, thanking the birds for their beautiful singing, helping rebuild the anthill, picking a bunch of flowers with pollen for the bees, and sharing his breakfast with some ducks. He arrives at the castle and politely asks the woman if he can attempt the challenge. She asks him to come back at nine. When he does, she gives him the task with the seeds. Hans makes little progress, and after a quarter of an hour, he nearly gives up. Suddenly, a long line of ants appear and pick up every single seed and place them back in the basket. Hans is very grateful and thanks them. The old woman returns and is very pleased at Hans' progress. She again drops the twelve keys into the pond, giving Hans one hour to retrieve them all. Hans is worried, for he is not a strong swimmer. He tries, but it seems hopeless. Then the ducks he met in the forest retrieve the keys for him. Hans thanks them. The old woman returns and is very impressed. She takes Hans to the room with the three veiled figures. The sorcerer himself is there too. The woman warns Hans of the consequences if he chooses the wrong one and leaves. Hans is still pondering when a swarm of bees fly through the window and buzz around the figure in the middle. After the old woman comes back, Hans tells her and the sorcerer that the middle one is the princess. The veils fall, revealing that Hans made the right choice. Hans gratefully thanks the bees. With the spell broken, the sorcerer and the two dragons die, and the beautiful princess takes Hans back to her palace to be her husband. Hans' parents are invited to the wedding, and even though they have lost Hellmerich, they are very pleased for their son and give him their blessing, ashamed for thinking so little of him.

== Variants ==
- Some versions say that Hellmerich was called Elmerico and was turned into stone for his failure of completing the tasks or throw into a black abyss for eternity, while Hans was called John and after he completed the tasks, his brother was changed back to normal and the sorcerer and the evil dragons were thrown into the abyss.

== See also ==
- The Queen Bee
