= About Ash Lad, Who Stole the Troll's Silver Ducks, Coverlet, and Golden Harp =

Norwegian folktale

Boots and the Troll

Folk tale
- Name: Boots and the Troll
- Aarne–Thompson grouping: 328
- Country: Norway
- Published in: Norwegian Folktales
- Related: Hop o' My Thumb; The Bee and the Orange Tree

"About Ash Lad, Who Stole the Troll's Silver Ducks, Coverlet, and Golden Harp" (Dano-Norwegian: Om Askeladden, som stjal Troldets Sølvænder, Sengetæppe og Guldharpe) is a Norwegian folktale collected by Peter Christen Asbjørnsen and Jørgen Moe in Norwegian Folktales (Norske Folkeeventyr No. 1), translated as "Boots and the Troll" by George Webbe Dasent in 1859.

== Textual notes ==
The name "Askepot" was used in the first edition (1843), where the tale was entitled "Om Askepot, som stjal Troldets Sølvænder, Sengetæppe og Guldharpe". The name was changed to Askeladden in the 2nd edition (1852), but only in the title, and the name remained Askepot throughout the story. (Note: Brunvald calls the tale "About Askeladden who Stole from the Troll".) This was rectified in later issued editions.

The tale has been translated as "About Ash Lad, Who Stole the Troll's Silver Ducks, Coverlet, and Golden Harp" by Tiina Nunnally, and as "Boots and the Troll" by Dasent (1859).

== Synopsis ==
A poor man died. His three sons set out to seek their fortune. The two older would have nothing to do with the youngest son, who they said was fit for nothing but to sit and poke about in ashes. The youngest brought a kneading-trough, the only thing their parents had left behind, which his brothers had not bothered with. His brothers got places under the coachman and gardener at the royal castle, and he got one in the kitchen.

He did so much better than they did that they became envious and told the coachman that he had said he could get for the king seven silver ducks that belonged to a troll, and which the king had long desired. The coachman told the king. When the king insisted that he do it, he demanded wheat and rye, rowed over the lake, in the kneading trough, to the troll's place, and lured the ducks into the trough using the grain.

Then his brothers told the coachman he had said he could steal the troll's bed-quilt, and the coachman again told the king. He demanded three days, and when he saw the bed-quilt being hung out to air, he stole it. This time, the king made him his body-servant.

His brothers told the coachman he had said he could steal the troll's golden harp that made everyone who heard it glad, and the coachman again told the king. He said he needed six days to think. Then he rowed over, with a nail, a birch-pin, and a taper-end, and let the troll see him. It seized him at once, and put him in a pen to fatten him. One day he stuck out the nail instead of his finger, then the birch-pin, and finally the taper-end, at which point they concluded he was fat enough.

The troll went off to ask guests to come, and his daughter went to slaughter the youth. He told her the knife wasn't sharp enough, sharpened it, and suggested testing it on one of her braids; when testing, he cut off her head and then he roasted half of her and boiled the other, as the troll had said he should be cooked. He sat in the corner dressed in her clothing, and the troll ate his daughter and asked if he didn't want any. The youth said he was too sad. The troll told him to get the harp, and where it was. The youth took it and set off in the kneading trough again. The troll shouted after him, and the youth told him he had eaten his own daughter. That made him burst, and the youth took all the troll's gold and silver, and with them won the princess's hand in marriage and half the kingdom. And then his brothers were killed by boulders when they went up a mountain.

== Analysis ==
The tale has been categorized as Aarne-Thompson type 328 "The Boy Steals the Giant's Treasure".

== See also ==
- Boots and His Brothers
- Boots Who Made the Princess Say, "That's a Story"
- Corvetto (fairy tale)
- Esben and the Witch
- Jack and the Beanstalk
- The Gold-bearded Man
- The Grateful Beasts
- The Little Girl Sold with the Pears
- The Three Aunts
- Thirteenth
