= The Story of Pretty Goldilocks =

Literary fairy tale written by French author Mme. d'Aulnoy

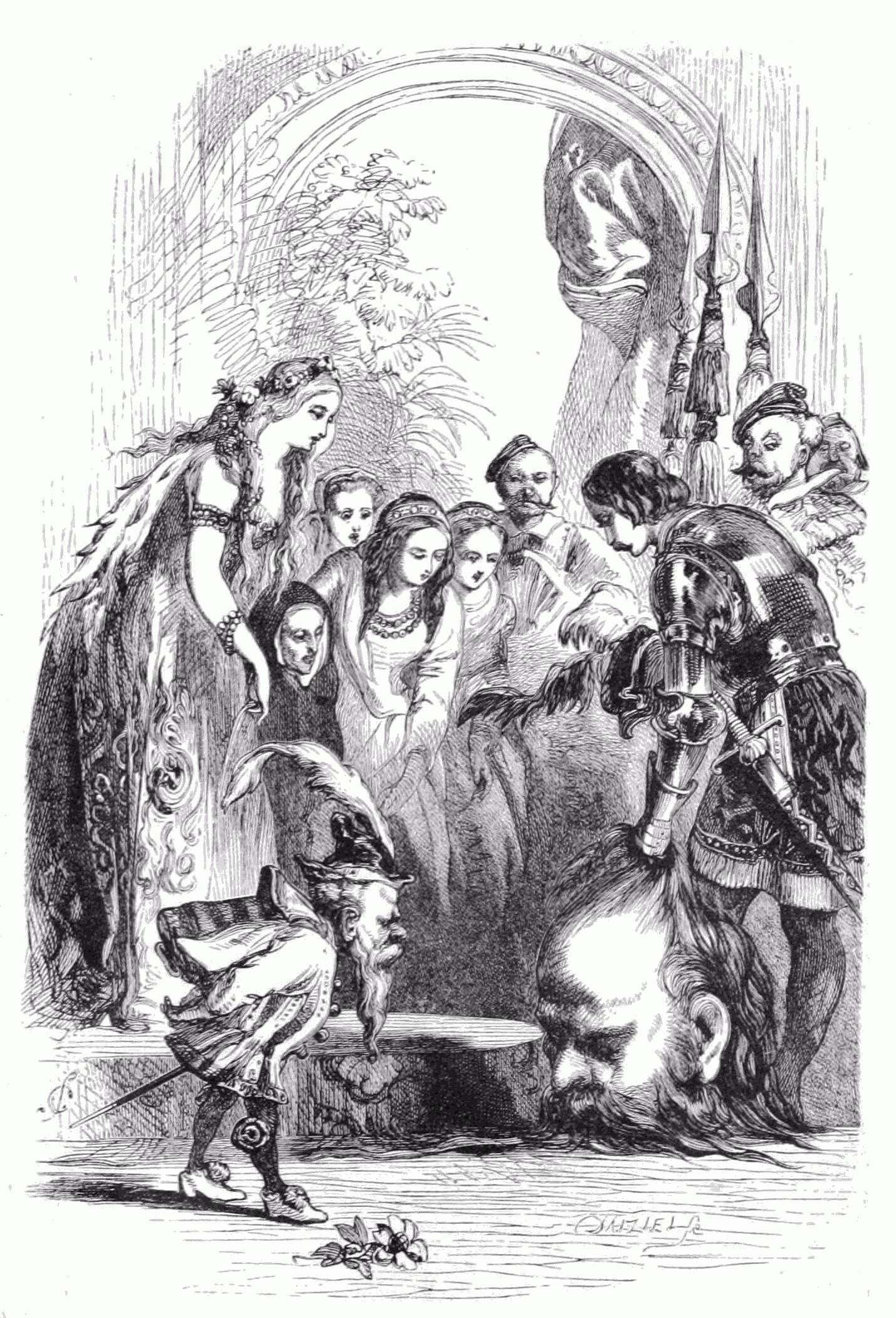
- The ambassador presents Goldilocks with the giant's head as proof of his deed.

Folk tale
- Name: The Story of Pretty Goldilocks
- Also known as: La Belle aux cheveux d'or
- Aarne–Thompson grouping: ATU 531 (The Clever Horse)
- Region: France
- Published in: Les Contes des Fées (1697), by Madame d'Aulnoy
- Related: Ferdinand the Faithful and Ferdinand the Unfaithful; The Firebird and Princess Vasilisa; Corvetto; King Fortunatus's Golden Wig; Dapplegrim; Livoretto (Italian literary fairy tale); Zlatovláska (Slavic fairy tale); Princess Bella-Flor (Spanish fairy tale)

"The Story of Pretty Goldilocks" or "The Beauty with Golden Hair" is a French literary fairy tale written by Madame d'Aulnoy. Andrew Lang included it in The Blue Fairy Book.

It is Aarne–Thompson type 531. This type is generally called "The Clever Horse", but is known in French as La Belle aux cheveux d'or, after this tale. Other tales of this type include Ferdinand the Faithful and Ferdinand the Unfaithful, The Firebird and Princess Vasilisa, Corvetto, King Fortunatus's Golden Wig.

== Synopsis ==
A princess was so beautiful and had such golden hair that she was known as Pretty Goldilocks. A neighboring king fell in love with her from her description, but much to the king's disappointment, she rejected his ambassador, saying she had no wish to be married. A young courtier and royal favorite, called Charming, told his friends that if he had gone, she would have accepted, and the king threw him in prison. He lamented his fate, and the king, hearing, told him what he had said was the cause of it. Charming said that he would have drawn such a picture of the king as to make him irresistible to her, and the king decided to send him. On the way, he helped a carp that was out of water, a raven being chased by an eagle, and an owl caught in a net; each one promised to help him.

When he attempted to bring his master's suit before the princess, she told him that she had lost a ring in the river and was so vexed that she would not listen to any suit unless the ambassador brought back her ring. His dog, Frisk, advised him to try, and the carp brought him the ring. When he brought it to Goldilocks, she told him that a giant who was a prince had tried to marry her and was troubling her subjects. She could not listen unless he killed the giant. He went to fight it, and with the raven's aid in pecking the giant's eyes during the fight, he succeeded. Goldilocks refused unless he brought her some water from the Fountain of Health and Beauty, and the owl fetched the water for him.

The princess agreed then and made preparations to go and marry the king, although she at times wished they could stay, and she would marry Charming. Charming refused to be disloyal to his king.

Goldilocks married the king but remained fond of Charming, and Charming's enemies told the king that she praised him so highly, he should be jealous. The king had Charming thrown in a tower. When Goldilocks begged for his freedom, the king refused, but decided to rub his face with the water from the Fountain of Health and Beauty to please her. A maid had broken that bottle, though, and replaced it with another, not knowing the other bottle was actually a potent poison used for executing nobles by rubbing their faces with it.

Frisk came to the queen and asked her not to forget Charming, and the queen immediately released him and married him.

== Analysis ==
=== The horse helper ===
The Aarne–Thompson–Uther tales types ATU 530, 531 (The Clever Horse) and 533 (The Speaking Horsehead) fall under the umbrella of Supernatural Helper in the folk/fairy tale index and pertain to a cycle of stories in which a magical horse helps the hero or heroine by giving advice and/or instructing him/her.

According to French folklorist Paul Delarue, the tale type ATU 531 is known in French academia as La Belle aux Cheveux d'Or, after d'Aulnoy's tale. At the beginning of the story, the hero finds some shiny objects in his way (a shining feather or a shining lock of hair), but his talking horse warns him against it.

=== The role of the heroine ===
The heroine's lack of agency has been noticed and called into question: despite being part of Madame d'Aulnoy's cast of heroines and princesses with agency in her literary fairy tales, Princess Goldilocks still needs the intervention of a third party (the loyal ambassador) in order to ensure her happy ending at the end of the tale.

=== The name of the princess ===
Alternate translations to the name of the tale are Princess Goldenhair, The Fair with Golden Hair The Fair Maid with Golden Locks, or Fair Goldilocks. Fair is an English word associated with beauty, and it keeps the connection between light-colored hair and good qualities, like kindness and beauty.

=== The ritual of rejuvenation or beautification ===
In many variants, the last item the hero must quest for is the "milk of fiery mares", which will grant beauty, strength and vigour after a special ritual. Russian folklorist Alexander Afanasyev mentioned that these equine characters come from the sea. When the princess uses the magical milk, the horse helper uses its breath to protect the hero, by inhaling the fumes or by cooling the mixture. When the kingly rival steps in, he is killed in the process. Likewise, as described by professor Susan Hoogasian-Villa, in Armenian variants, the sea horse's milk also grants youth to the character. In regards to a similar motif in Russian variants, Jack Haney suggested an oriental origin.

Folklorist Alexander Krappe also noted that, in many variants, the hero quests for a water of life and a water of death. When the emperor or king uses the ointment or magical water, a mix-up happens: the maid or a lady-in-waiting accidentally breaks the flask and, in a hurry, unknowingly substitutes the broken vial with poison. This theme is also widespread in French literary and oral tradition, under the theme of La Jeune Fille aux cheveux d'or et l'Eau de la mort et de la vie: a king, emperor or sultan becomes enamored with a princess or lady of royal birth, famed for her golden hair, and sends an emissary (a knight, a page, an ambassador) to win her over in his stead. When the dame is brought before her would-be suitor, she seizes the opportunity to dispose of him, by performing an elaborate ritual involving the holy water, or bath. After the deed is done, her kingly suitor is (accidentally or deliberately) killed, and she is free to marry the emissary.

== Variants ==
=== Origins ===
Professor Stith Thompson remarked that the geographic distribution of the tale pointed to "an unbroken line through the Caucasus, the Near East, India, Cambodia, and the Philippines", which suggested an Eastern point of origin, "possibly from India". In the same vein, professor Gönül Tekin agreed with an Eastern source, but via Central Asia and Iran, not India. Its dissemination is also said to be limited "to Eastern Europe, Greece, Turkey and India".

A quantitative study, published by folklorist Sara Graça da Silva and anthropologist Jamshid J. Tehrani in 2016, seemed to indicate that the tale type shows a certain antiquity: based on a phylogenetic model, both researchers estimated that the ATU 531 type belongs to an ancestral tale corpora of the Indo-Iranian languages and the Western branch of the Indo-European languages.

=== Literary connections ===
Folklorist and comparative mythologist Alexander Haggerty Krappe, in a 1925 article, argued that the myth of Jason and Medea was a reworking of the widespread folktale The Quest of the Princess with the Golden Hair, by illuminating parallels between the Greek myth and the tale type: the hero is helped by a talking horse (or mule, or donkey, given by a spirit, God, Virgin Mary, or the Devil), so - Krappe deduced - the Argo ship must have been originally given by a deity, and served to warn Jason against dangers. Also, Krappe indicated that the king, in the tale type, sends the hero to find him precious treasures associated with gold, and with the golden-haired princess in the folktale, who is sometimes associated with the Sun - like Medea, descendant of Sun god Helios. Lastly, the princess of the tale type submits the hero and the king to an experiment of rejuvenating, which involves both men entering a burning oven, or bathing in boiling milk or oil. Krappe, to conclude his comparison, cited that ancient authors Pherecydes of Syros and Simonides reported variations wherein Medea applies a similar rejuvenating treatment to Jason himself, instead of Pelias.

A line of scholarship believes that the tale type ATU 531 also shows parallels with the Celtic chivalric romance of Tristan and Iseult, namely French Emmanuel Cosquin and Germans Reinhold Köhler and Ernst Tegethoff. They argued for the presence of motifs of the tale type in Tristan and Isolde: in some versions of the Celtic romance, a little bird (a swallow) flies to King Mark's castle with a strand of golden hair in its beak; he then becomes interested in finding its owner.

German folklorist Felix Liebrecht seemed to agree with Köhler's assessment of the connection between the chivalric romance and the tale type, but complemented his analysis. Liebrecht located the motif of the lock of golden hair in the Ancient Egyptian story, Tale of Two Brothers: after being exiled from home, Batu is given a wife by the gods. One day, the Nile river washes a lock of her hair to the court of the Pharaoh, who falls in love with its owner. The Pharaoh's wise men tell him that its owner is the daughter of the Sun god, lord of the celestial realms and of the waters.

Cosquin also indicated another Indian parallel to the story. In the Indian work Singhasan Battisi ("Thirty-Two Tales of the Throne"), a princess sets a challenge for any suitor: they must jump into a vat of boiling oil before they have a chance to court her. Of course, this has taken the lives of countless suitors. When King Vikramaditya learns of this, he decides to jump into the vat. He does and is scorched to death. However, the princess herself dowses Vikramaditya's body with amrita (a water of immortality) and restores the king to full health.

==== Jochanan and the Scorpion ====
Another connected story, ascribed to a Jewish legend contained in the Ma'assebuch, was published by German theologian Christoph Helvig, in 1602. In this tale, an impious king is advised by his councillors to take a wife, when a bird appears with a golden hair in its beak. He then summons a court favourite, Rabbi Chanina, to find the owner of the golden hair. With the help of grateful animals (lacking a horse, however), Rabbi Chanina brings the king the princess and vials of water of paradise and water of hell. Rabbi Chanina is killed by envious courtiers, but the princess resurrects him with the water of paradise. The princess then dowses the impious king with the water of hell and he burns to ashes, freeing the way for the princess to marry Rabbi Chanina.

Even earlier than the Jewish (or Yiddish) Ma'assebuch tale is a Hebrew story contained in a Medieval French work named Sefer ha-ma'asim, dated to the 12th century (by Moses Gaster) or to the 13th century. Gaster translated the tale as The Princess with Golden Hair, but the tale is also known as Joḥanan and the Scorpion, The Tale of Rabbi Johanan and the Scorpion and The Scorpion in the Goblet. Gaster also published a version of the Ma'aseh Book which contains a version where the rabbi finds a frog, not a scorpion. According to academic Peninnah Schram, Rabbi Hanina (or Rabbi Johanan in Hebrew versions) appears in Jewish tradition in tales either with the scorpion or the frog.

In this story, in the first part, Jochanan helps a man who brings him a mystical cup that has a scorpion inside; Jochanan raises the scorpion, which can talk, is immortal and explains he is the son of first man Adam; in the second part of the tale, a king is pressed to marry and sire an heir, when a raven brings a strand of golden hair that belongs to a princess. The king sends for Jochanan and orders him to bring the owner of the hair. Jochanan goes in search of the queen (or "queen-fairy", in Rella Kushelevsky's translation), who learns of Jochanan's quest and agrees to go with him, but after Jochanan finds her a pitcher with water from Hell and another with water from the Garden of Eden (which a raven helps Jochanan to accomplish) and her lost ring (which he finds with a fish's help). Johanan is killed, but the queen revives him with the water from the Garden of Eden.

=== Predecessors ===
A predecessor to the tale penned by Madame d'Aulnoy is Livoretto, an Italian literary fairy tale by Giovanni Straparola, in his The Facetious Nights.

=== Distribution ===
==== Europe ====
Despite its origins as a literary tale penned by Madame d'Aulnoy, the story shares many recognizable themes and motifs with many tales collected from oral tradition and folklore, such as those by the Brothers Grimm. For example, Ferdinand the Faithful and Ferdinand the Unfaithful. In French sources, d'Aulnoy's tale has been reported to have influenced at least 5 of the 51 versions collected.

The character of the foreign princess of an exotic, sometimes fictional, country appears in French variant La princesse de Tronkolaine ("The Princess of Tronkolaine").

The episode where the king tries to get rid of his rival by bathing in a vat of a special mixture or using the ointment/holy water the hero collected also happens in Romanian fairy tale The Girl Who Pretended to be a Boy, published in 1901 in Andrew Lang's The Violet Fairy Book. A similar event happens in Russian fairy tale The Firebird and Princess Vasilisa and in French/Breton fairy tale King Fortunatus's Golden Wig (Barvouskenn ar roue Fortunatus).

The character of the lovely maiden with golden hair also appears in Slavic fairy tales, with the name Dieva Zlato Vláska or simply Zlatovláska, meaning Goldenhair. As such, the fairy tale was adapted into the Czech film Zlatovláska (Goldilocks, Czechoslovakia, 1973).

A variant in Spanish has been collected by writer Fernán Caballero, titled Bella-Flor. The tale has been translated into English and published in Andrew Lang's The Orange Fairy Book, with the name The Princess Bella-Flor.

According to Professor Bronislava Kerbelytė, the tale type is reported to register two hundred Lithuanian variants, under the banner The Clever Horse, with and without contamination from other tale types.

At least two Armenian variants combine the tale type ATU 531, "The Clever Horse" with ATU 551, "The Water of Life ("The Wonderful Remedy for the King)". In Kush-Pari or The Bird-Peri, three princes search for a cure for their father's blindness, but only the youngest is successful in journeying beyond the realm with his father's magical horse. The prince finds a brilliant golden feather on the way to another kingdom and delivers it to a second king, who wants the bird: the titular Kush-Pari. The prince fetches the Kush-Pari, her handmaiden and forty fiery mares for a ritual. The prince and the king take part in the ritual, but the king dies and the prince marries the Kush-Pari, now in human form. As the tale concludes, the Kush-Pari gives her husband the remedy to save his father. In The Fiery Horse, the three princes must seek, as remedy for their father, a lump of earth from "no human has even trodden". To help them in their quest, they need their father's Fiery Horse, found in the depths of a forest, but only the youngest prince finds and rides it. They ride into the Dark City and find a Luminous Feather. They appear before the king of this city, who wishes to own the bird of the luminous plumage. The second task is to bring the king the maiden who owns 40 cows swift as the wind and their milk as the third task. The prince and the king go through a ritual with the boiling milk, but only the prince goes unscathed and marries the maiden. Some time later, she reveals to her husband the location of the fabled lump of earth: at the bottom of a lake, guarded by "ferocious Watery Horses tall as Mares".

==== Asia ====
A Filipino variant, titled Benito, the faithful servant, has been collected and published in The Journal of American Folklore.

Variants of tale have been identified in the works of Pandit Ram Gharib Chaube and British orientalist William Crooke.

== Legacy ==
The tale was one of many from d'Aulnoy's pen to be adapted to the stage by James Planché, as part of his Fairy Extravaganza. He translated the tale as The Fair One with Golden Locks for the stage.

The tale was adapted and retold by William Trowbridge Larned as The King's Messenger.

== See also ==
- Dapplegrim
- The Death of Koschei the Deathless
- Ileana Simziana
- The Firebird and Princess Vasilisa
- King Fortunatus's Golden Wig
