= The Firebird and Princess Vasilisa =

Russian fairy tale

Folk tale
- Name: The Firebird and Princess Vasilisa
- Aarne–Thompson grouping: ATU 531 (The Clever Horse)
- Country: Russia
- Published in: Narodnye russkie skazki, by Alexander Afanasyev
- Related: Ferdinand the Faithful and Ferdinand the Unfaithful; Corvetto; King Fortunatus's Golden Wig; The Mermaid and the Boy; The Story of Pretty Goldilocks

The Firebird and Princess Vasilisa (Russian: Жар-птица и царевна Василиса) is a Russian fairy tale collected by Alexander Afanasyev in Narodnye russkie skazki. It is one of many tales written about the mythical Firebird.

It is Aarne-Thompson type 531. Other tales of this type include Ferdinand the Faithful and Ferdinand the Unfaithful, Corvetto, King Fortunatus's Golden Wig. Another, literary variant is Madame d'Aulnoy's La Belle aux cheveux d'or, or The Story of Pretty Goldilocks.

== Synopsis ==
A royal huntsman found a feather of the firebird and, though his horse warned him against it, picked it up. The king demanded that he bring him the bird. The huntsman went to his horse, who told him to demand that measures of corn be spread over the fields. He did, and the firebird came to eat and was caught.

He brought it to the king, who said that because he had done that, now he must bring him Princess Vasilisa to be his bride. The horse had him demand food and drink for the journey, and a tent with a golden top. With it, they set out to a lake where the princess was rowing with golden oars in a silver boat. The huntsman set up the tent and set out the food. The princess came and ate, and drinking foreign wine, she became drunk and slept. He carried her off.

Princess Vasilisa refused to marry without her wedding gown, from the bottom of the sea. The king sent the huntsman for it. He rode the horse to the sea, where the horse found a great crab (or lobster) and threatened to crush it. The crab asked the horse to spare it and summoned all the crabs to fetch the wedding gown.

Princess Vasilisa refused to marry without the king ordering the huntsman to bathe in boiling water. The huntsman went to his horse, who charmed his body. He bathed in the boiling water. Not only was he not harmed but also became handsome. The king went to bathe in the same water, and died. The people took the huntsman as their king, and he married the princess.

== Translations ==
The tale was translated into English language with the title The Fire-Bird, the Horse of Power and the Princess Vasillisa, by Arthur Ransome.

== Analysis ==
=== Tale type ===
The tale is classified as the East Slavic type SUS 531, Russian: Конек-горбуно, romanized: Konek-gorbunok, lit. 'The Humpbacked Horse', of the East Slavic Folktale Classification (Russian: СУС, romanized: SUS): with the help of an unassuming little horse, the hero finds a golden feather, the golden bird and the princess; at the end of the tale, the hero has to bathe in boiling milk and becomes beautiful, whereas the king dies after going through the same process. The East Slavic type corresponds, in the international Aarne-Thompson-Uther Index, to type ATU 531, "The Clever Horse".

== Variants ==
=== Russia ===
Alexander Afanasyev collected two variants in his original compilation of Russian folk tales (numbered 169–170), under the banner "Жар-птица и Василиса-царевна" ("The Bird-of-Fire and Tsarevna Vasilisa").

=== Ukraine ===
Another variant from a Slavic source (Cossack/Ukrainian) is "Тремсинъ — Жаръ-птица и Настасья прекрасная изъ моря" (English: "Tremsin, Bird of Zhar and Nastasya, the Beautiful One that comes from the sea"). This Ukrainian tale was translated as The Story of Tremsin, the Bird Zhar and Nastasia, the Lovely Maid of the Sea by Robert Nisbet Bain and as The Feather of the Zhar Bird, by illustrator Katherine Pyle.

=== Slovenia ===
Author Bozena Nemcová collected and published a variant from Slovenia, with the name O Ptáku Ohniváku a o Mořské Panne ("The Fire-Bird and the Maiden of the Sea").

=== Czech Republic ===
Czech author Václav Tille (writing under pseudonym Václav Říha) published the tale Dcera mořského krále ("The Sea-King's Daughter"): a man is tasked with guarding the king's fields against something that comes in the night and tramples them. The man discovers the culprits: a white steed and several mares; he captures the steed and takes it to the stables. On one occasion, the man sees a golden lock of hair and delivers it to his king. The monarch says it belongs to the Sea-King's Daughter and orders the boy to bring the maiden in person to him. The youth begins his quest with the help of the white horse he tamed. After a series of increasingly difficult tasks, the princess sends the youth for her "horses of the sea". He brings them back to the princess, who suggests the king should try some of the milk the horses produce. The hesitant monarch says the youth should try it first, and the white horse "blows its breath to cool it".

== See also ==
- The Gifts of the Magician
- Tsarevitch Ivan, the Fire Bird and the Gray Wolf
- How Ian Direach got the Blue Falcon
- The Sister of the Sun
