= King Fortunatus's Golden Wig =

French fairy tale collected by Colonel A. Troude and G. Milin

"King Fortunatus's Golden Wig" (Breton: Barvouskenn ar roue Fortunatus) is a French fairy tale collected by Colonel A. Troude and G. Milin in Le Conteur breton ou Contes bretons.

It is Aarne-Thompson type 531. This type is generally called "The Clever Horse", but is known in French as "La Belle aux cheveux d'or", or "The Story of Pretty Goldilocks", after the literary variant by Madame d'Aulnoy. Other tales of this type include "Ferdinand the Faithful and Ferdinand the Unfaithful", "The Firebird and Princess Vasilisa", "Corvetto".

== Synopsis ==
A couple had no children. The husband went to a wise man, who offered him his choice of apples from a tree. He picked a white one and ate it. The wise man told him he would have a son within a year, but when the boy was fifteen, he would leave and take nothing. At that time, he should tell the boy to take what he found in the ruined hut at the end of a path.

When the boy, Jean, was fifteen, it happened as the wise man had said, and his father told him to take what he found there. Jean found a bridled and saddled horse and rode off on it. Against the horse's advice, he looked to see what quarreling crows had dropped. When he found it was King Fortunatus's golden wig, he took it for Mardi Gras, though the horse warned him against it. It took him to the king and stayed in the forest, in a hut of branches, while Jean went to work for the king as a stable boy. The horses he cared for did so much better than the others' horses that he roused their envy. He found that the wig glowed and so used it instead of candles.

When Mardi Gras came, he wore the wig. The king took him for a king's son, but Jean admitted to being his stable boy, and the king took the wig. The other stable boys told the king that Jean said he could marry King Fortunatus's daughter, and the king demanded that Jean bring her. Jean went to his horse in the forest, and it told him to get three ships, with beef, millet, and oats. They sailed up a river: first through the land of lions, where they threw out the beef, and the grateful king of the lions gave him a hair to call on the lions; then through the land of ants, where they threw out the millet, and the king of the ants gave him one of its hind legs; then through the land of geese, where they threw out the oats, and the king of the geese gave him a feather.

They arrived at King Fortunatus's lands. Upon hearing of their mission, he sent them to rest before their tasks, but in the morning, he ordered him to sort all sorts of grain, which were heaped together in the granary, in one day; Jean rested all day and summoned the ants to do it, which did it so quickly that one ant had nothing to do. The next day, the king gave him a shell to empty a pool and sort out the fish into large and small in two basins. Jean rested again and summoned the geese, who completed the task. The king then ordered him to chop down a forest, but Jean summoned the lions, who did it. The king agreed to let him take his daughter, but she warned Jean that she would set tasks as well. She bid farewell to her castle and threw the keys in the sea. When they returned, the princess demanded that her castle be brought; the horse had them return to near the princess's castle and have the lions summoned, which killed the lions that guarded her castle and attached it to their ship. The princess then demanded the keys to it. The horse had Jean sail out to sea and fire the cannon. The king of the fish came to complain of the noise, and Jean agreed to stop for the keys. When the princess received the keys, she demanded that Jean be burned. Jean went to the horse. It had him curry it and collect all the dust; then he was to add water to it, dig a hole by the pole, and wash himself and the shirt he was to be burned in with the water. When he did all this, the fire burned quickly, and Jean jumped out, alive and more handsome. The princess said she would be happy to marry the king if he were as handsome as Jean. The king had himself burned and died. The princess said that Jean had done all the work, and so married him instead.

== Commentary ==
In legends, the hero is often sent after a woman for the king, not because of a wig, but because a strand of her hair fell into the king's hand. This version is found in variants of the legend of Tristan and Isolde.

== See also ==
- The Gifts of the Magician
