= Esben and the Witch =

Danish fairy tale

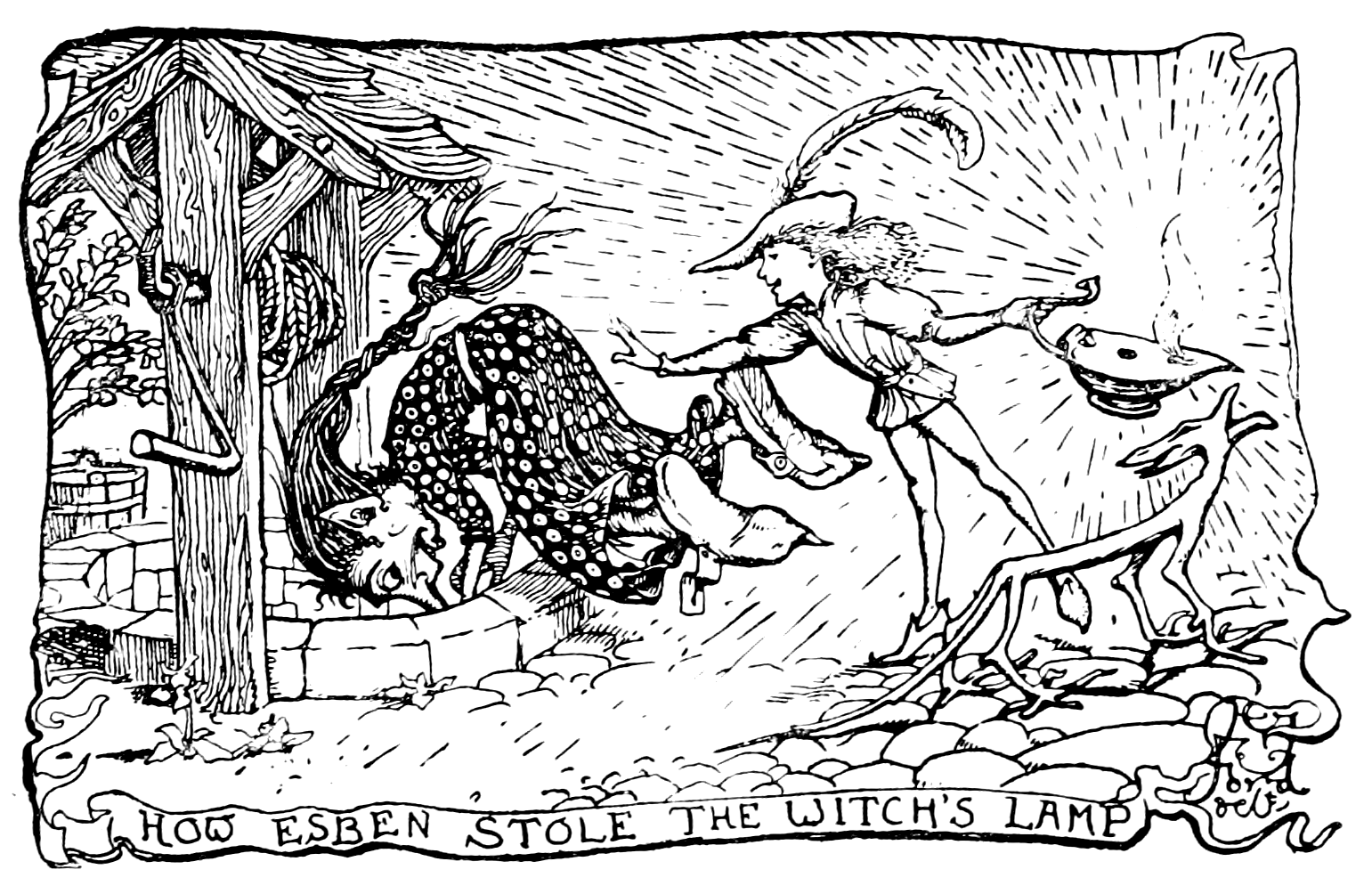

Folk tale
- Name: Esben and the Witch
- Aarne–Thompson grouping: 327B
- Country: Denmark
- Published in: The Pink Fairy Book; A Book of Witches

Esben and the Witch (Danish language: Esben og Troldheksen) is a Danish fairy tale first collected by Jens Kamp. Andrew Lang included it in The Pink Fairy Book. A version of the tale also appears in A Book of Witches and A Choice of Magic, by Ruth Manning-Sanders. It is Aarne-Thompson type 327B (a small boy defeats an ogre). In it, a boy named Esben outwits an evil witch to get the magical treasures for the sake of his brothers.

== Synopsis ==
A farmer had twelve sons, and the youngest, Esben, was little while his brothers were big and strong. One day the brothers persuaded their father to let them seek their fortunes; he gave them each horses and money. Esben decided he would go too. His father refused to aid him. He took a stick and whittled it, so it was whiter than his brothers' horses, and rode off on it.

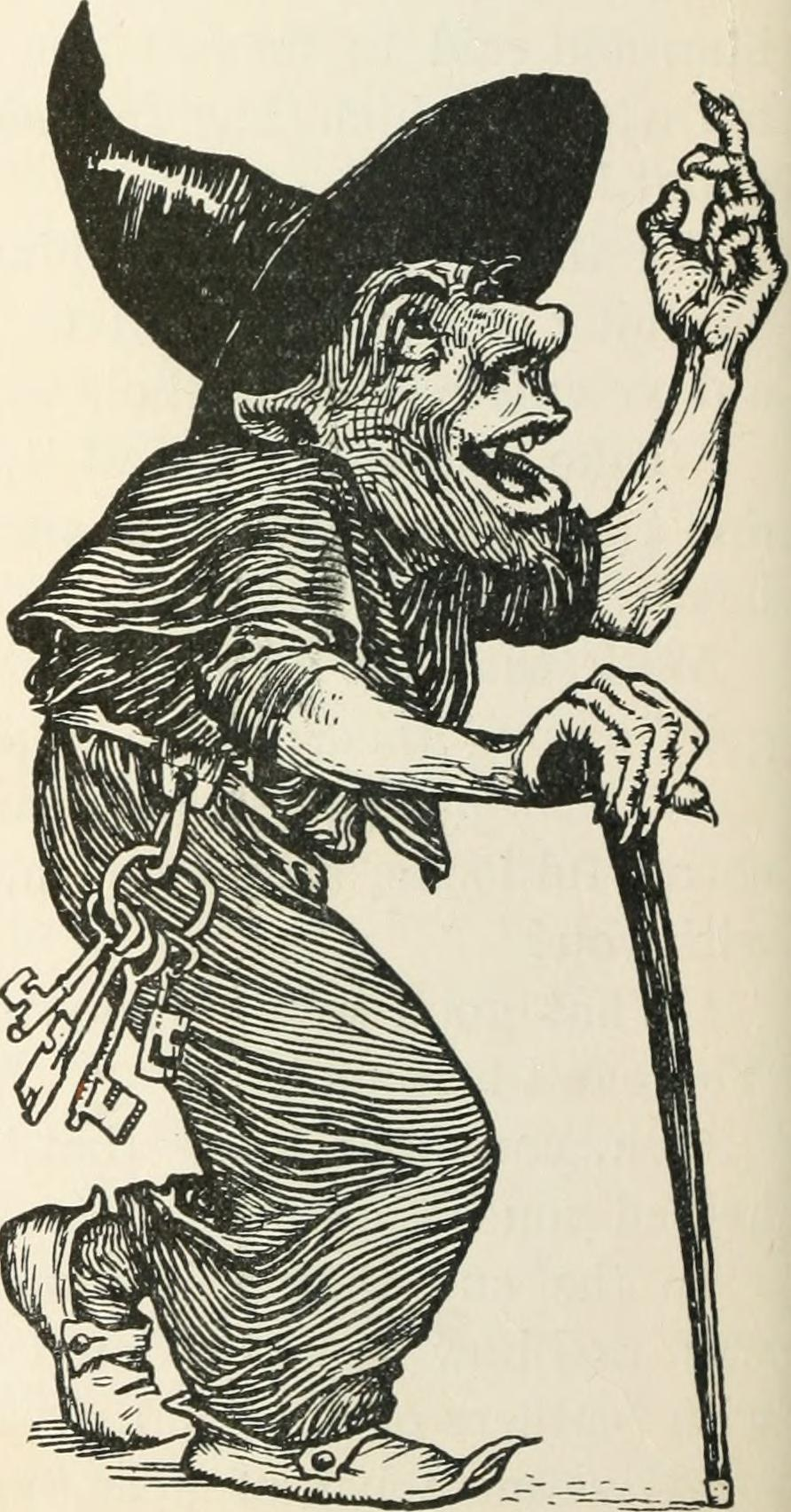

The eleven brothers came to a house where a woman told them they could stay for the night and each have one of her daughters. They were pleased. Esben came up behind them and sneaked about. In the night, he had his brothers change caps with the girls. At midnight, the woman, who was a witch, came with a knife and cut the throats of eleven of her sleeping daughters, because of their night caps. Esben woke his brothers, and they all fled. The brothers left Esben behind on their horses.

The brothers took service with the king as stableboys. When Esben arrived, no one gave him a place, but he managed to get his food with one thing or another. His brothers did not stand to attention for Sir Red, whom everyone else at the castle hated but the king liked. Sir Red decided to revenge himself by saying they had said they could get the king a dove with a silver feather and a golden one. The king demanded it of them. Esben told them to get him some peas, then he recited a charm to his stick, and it flew him back to the witch's. He had noticed she had such a dove; he spread the peas and caught it. The witch saw him too late to catch him, but they exchanged taunts.

Angry, Sir Red claimed that they had said that they could get him the magical boar with silver and golden bristles. Esben made them give him a bag of malt, and using it, caught just the boar that belonged to the witch. The king was pleased with that, although his brothers did not even thank Esben. Sir Red claimed they had said they could get a lamp that could shine over seven kingdoms. Esben returned to the witch's house and hid inside. The witch called to her daughter to make her porridge and add no salt, so Esben poured salt into it. There was no water in the house, so the daughter asked her mother for the lamp to fetch more. Esben then pushed her into the well and she drowned, and he ran off with the lamp.

After the king received the lamp, Sir Red made a new claim, about a coverlet (bed cover) that made sound when touched. The boy tried to steal it, but it sounded and the witch caught him. But her last and youngest daughter took a liking to him, and together they twice tricked her mother into having him live in captivity. Eventually, when the witch had to go to a meeting of witches, Esben pushed the final girl in the oven and stole the coverlet. After all of her offspring have been destroyed, the returning witch was so furious she burst into small pieces of flint.

His brothers were already in prison to be executed, but the king freed them. Esben also told him about Sir Red, and the king hanged him and rewarded all the brothers with gold and silver, and they returned home, telling their father how Esben had saved them.

== See also ==
- Hop-o'-My-Thumb, another story about a small boy and his normal brothers, where the boy changes the hatwear of his brothers at night with those from an antagonistic character's daughters.
