= List of Manning-Sanders tales by region =

A region-by-region list of fairy and folk tales collected and retold by Ruth Manning-Sanders (1886–1988). Regions (or cultural groups) are as listed by Manning-Sanders in either the table of contents, the forewords or the introductions of her various fairy tale anthologies. This list contains most of the fairy-tale titles that have links from Manning-Sanders' biography page. Exceptions are Stories from the English and Scottish Ballads and A Book of Magical Beasts, an anthology of others' works that she edited.

== Africa ==
- The Kindly Ghost, A Book of Ghosts and Goblins
- Mainu the Frog, A Book of Magic Animals
- Niassa and the Ogre, A Book of Princes and Princesses
- The Pick Handle, A Book of Enchantments and Curses
- The Seven Monsters, A Book of Monsters
- The spirits in the rat-hole, The Haunted Castle
- Terry Gong-Gong, Fox Tales
- The Two Wizards, A Book of Wizards and A Choice of Magic
- Walker by Moonlight, The Three Witch Maidens
- What Came of Quarreling, A Book of Magic Horses
- What did you do? Fox Tales

== Alaska ==
- The Caribou Wife, Folk and Fairy Tales

== Alsace ==
- The Kittle-Kittle Car, A Book of Devils and Demons

== American Indian ==
- Adventures of Coyote, Red Indian Folk and Fairy Tales
- Adventures of Rabbit, Red Indian Folk and Fairy Tales
- Beautiful Girl, Red Indian Folk and Fairy Tales
- Beaver and Porcupine, Red Indian Folk and Fairy Tales
- The Fat Grandmother, Red Indian Folk and Fairy Tales
- The Forbidden Valley, The Haunted Castle
- Good Man and Bad Man, Red Indian Folk and Fairy Tales
- Grasshopper and Fox, Tortoise Tales
- Hare Running, Tortoise Tales
- The Magic Pebble, Red Indian Folk and Fairy Tales
- Micabo's Island, Red Indian Folk and Fairy Tales
- Napi and Nip, Red Indian Folk and Fairy Tales
- The Ogre, the Sun, and the Raven, A Book of Charms and Changelings
- Otter Heart and the Magic Kettle, Red Indian Folk and Fairy Tales
- Proud Girl and Bold Eagle, Red Indian Folk and Fairy Tales
- Rabbit and the Wolves, Tortoise Tales
- Raven and the Wicked One, Red Indian Folk and Fairy Tales
- Raven Boy and Little Hawk, Red Indian Folk and Fairy Tales
- Smoke Bones, Folk and Fairy Tales
- Snake Ogre, Red Indian Folk and Fairy Tales
- Star Maiden, Red Indian Folk and Fairy Tales
- Sun Arrow, Red Indian Folk and Fairy Tales
- Tortoise and the Children, Tortoise Tales
- Tortoise and Ogre, Tortoise Tales
- Ugly Thing, Red Indian Folk and Fairy Tales
- Young Mouse, Red Indian Folk and Fairy Tales
- Zini and the Witches, Red Indian Folk and Fairy Tales

== Arabia ==
- Aladdin, A Book of Wizards and A Choice of Magic
- The Four Abdallahs, A Book of Mermaids
- Hassan the Ropemaker, Sir Green Hat and the Wizard
- Little Mukra, A Book of Dwarfs

== Archangel ==
- The Leeshy Cat, A Book of Cats and Creatures
- The Princess's Slippers, A Book of Princes and Princesses and A Choice of Magic

== Australia ==
- The Bunyip, Old Witch Boneyleg
- Crow and the Pelicans, The Haunted Castle
- Goralasi and the Spectres, A Book of Spooks and Spectres

== Austria ==
- Oda and the Snake, A Book of Sorcerers and Spells
- The Tailor and the Hunter, Sir Green Hat and the Wizard

== Bavaria ==
- Plain Peter, Sir Green Hat and the Wizard

== Bohemia ==
- Dunber, A Book of Monsters
- The Giants in the Valley, The Three Witch Maidens
- Johnny and the Witch-Maidens, A Book of Witches and A Choice of Magic
- Long, Broad and Sharpsight, A Book of Wizards and Folk and Fairy Tales
- The Princess in the Iron Tower, A Book of Magic Horses
- Rubizal and the Miller's Daughter, A Book of Spooks and Spectres
- Rubizal's Black Horse, A Book of Magic Horses
- The Spook and the Pigs, A Book of Spooks and Spectres

== Bosnia and Herzegovina ==
- The Magic Bridle, A Book of Charms and Changelings
- What Happened to Ivan, A Book of Kings and Queens

== Brittany ==
- The Groach of the Isle of Lok, A Book of Mermaids
- Little Barbette, A Book of Magic Animals
- The Magic Belt, A Book of Princes and Princesses
- Margrette, A Book of Mermaids
- The North-west Wind, A Book of Magic Animals
- Pippi Menou and the Hanging Palace, Sir Green Hat and the Wizard
- The White Cat and the Green Snake, A Book of Princes and Princesses
- The White Lamb, A Book of Charms and Changelings

== Bukovina ==
- The Hazel-Nut Child, A Book of Dwarfs

== Carpathian Mountains ==
- The Little Red Mannikin, A Book of Devils and Demons

== Caucasus ==
- The little cake, Fox Tales

== China ==
- Baskets in a Little Cart, A Book of Dragons
- Chien Tang, A Book of Dragons
- Chien-Nang, A Book of Charms and Changelings
- Football on a Lake, A Book of Spooks and Spectres
- The Yellow Dragon, A Book of Dragons

== Cornwall ==
- Barker's Knee, Peter and the Piskies: Cornish Folk and Fairy Tales
- Betty Stogs' Baby, Peter and the Piskies: Cornish Folk and Fairy Tales
- The Boy and the Bull, Peter and the Piskies: Cornish Folk and Fairy Tales
- Bucca Dhu and Bucca Gwidden, Peter and the Piskies: Cornish Folk and Fairy Tales
- Cherry, Peter and the Piskies: Cornish Folk and Fairy Tales
- The Cock-Crow Stone, Peter and the Piskies: Cornish Folk and Fairy Tales
- The Crowza Stones, Peter and the Piskies: Cornish Folk and Fairy Tales
- The Demon Mason, Peter and the Piskies: Cornish Folk and Fairy Tales
- Duffy and the Devil, Peter and the Piskies: Cornish Folk and Fairy Tales
- Fairies on the Gump, Peter and the Piskies: Cornish Folk and Fairy Tales
- From the Head Downward, Peter and the Piskies: Cornish Folk and Fairy Tales
- The Giant Holiburn, Peter and the Piskies: Cornish Folk and Fairy Tales
- The Giant of the Mount, Peter and the Piskies: Cornish Folk and Fairy Tales
- How Jack Made His Fortune, A Book of Magic Horses
- Jack the Giant-Killer, A Book of Giants
- The Knockers of Ballowal, Peter and the Piskies: Cornish Folk and Fairy Tales
- Lutey and the Mermaid, Peter and the Piskies: Cornish Folk and Fairy Tales
- Lyonesse, Peter and the Piskies: Cornish Folk and Fairy Tales
- Madgy Figgey and the Sow, Peter and the Piskies: Cornish Folk and Fairy Tales
- Master Billy, A Book of Magic Horses
- The Mermaid in Church, Peter and the Piskies: Cornish Folk and Fairy Tales
- Mr Noy, Peter and the Piskies: Cornish Folk and Fairy Tales
- Parson Wood and the Devil, Peter and the Piskies: Cornish Folk and Fairy Tales
- Peepan Pee, Peter and the Piskies: Cornish Folk and Fairy Tales
- Peter and the Piskies, Peter and the Piskies: Cornish Folk and Fairy Tales
- The Piskie Thresher, Peter and the Piskies: Cornish Folk and Fairy Tales
- Saint Margery Daw, Peter and the Piskies: Cornish Folk and Fairy Tales
- Saint Neot, Peter and the Piskies: Cornish Folk and Fairy Tales
- Skillywidden, Peter and the Piskies: Cornish Folk and Fairy Tales
- The Small People's Cow, Peter and the Piskies: Cornish Folk and Fairy Tales
- Sneezy Snatcher and Sammy Small, A Book of Giants
- The Spriggans' Treasure, Peter and the Piskies: Cornish Folk and Fairy Tales
- The Tinner, the Dog, the Jew, and the Cake, Peter and the Piskies: Cornish Folk and Fairy Tales
- Tom and Giant Blunderbus, Peter and the Piskies: Cornish Folk and Fairy Tales
- Tredrill, A Book of Charms and Changelings
- Tregeagle, Peter and the Piskies: Cornish Folk and Fairy Tales
- The Two Sillies, Peter and the Piskies: Cornish Folk and Fairy Tales
- The Wish-hound, Peter and the Piskies: Cornish Folk and Fairy Tales
- The Witch of Fraddam, Peter and the Piskies: Cornish Folk and Fairy Tales

== Corsica ==
- Golden Hair, A Book of Ghosts and Goblins and A Choice of Magic

== Creole ==
- Hyena and Hare, Tortoise Tales

== Czechoslovakia ==
- King Josef, A Book of Kings and Queens and Folk and Fairy Tales
- Little pot, cook!, The Haunted Castle
- The Tailor, the Devil, and the Frogs, The Three Witch Maidens
- The Water Nick, A Book of Cats and Creatures

== Denmark ==
- Esben and the Witch, A Book of Witches and A Choice of Magic
- Franz the Garden Boy, A Book of Magic Horses
- Heaven Forbid!, A Book of Spooks and Spectres
- Little Wonder, A Book of Cats and Creatures
- Mons Tro, A Choice of Magic
- Nils in the Forest, A Book of Ogres and Trolls
- Rake Up!, A Book of Mermaids and A Choice of Magic
- A Ride to Hell, A Book of Devils and Demons
- Sir Green Hat and the Wizard, Sir Green Hat and the Wizard
- The Spook and the Beer Barrel, A Book of Spooks and Spectres
- The Story of Maia, A Book of Dwarfs
- Sven and Lilli, A Book of Mermaids and A Choice of Magic
- Tossen the Fool, Old Witch Boneyleg
- Tripple-Trapple, A Book of Devils and Demons
- The Troll's Little Daughter, A Book of Ogres and Trolls
- The White Dove, A Book of Witches

== East Africa ==
- Fox and Weasel, Fox Tales
- Tortoise and Elephant, Tortoise Tales

== Egypt ==
- Fox and Crow, Fox Tales

== England ==
- The Cauld Lad of Hilton, Old Witch Boneyleg
- The Golden Ball, A Book of Ghosts and Goblins
- Jack and the Beanstalk, A Book of Giants and A Choice of Magic
- Little Jip, A Book of Ghosts and Goblins
- Old Tommy and the Spectre, A Book of Spooks and Spectres
- The Old Witch, A Book of Witches and Folk and Fairy Tales
- The Small-tooth Dog, A Book of Magic Animals
- Sneezy Snatcher and Sammy Small, A Choice of Magic

== Estonia ==
- The Cook and the House Goblin, A Book of Ghosts and Goblins
- Fox the gooseherd, Fox Tales
- The Goblins at the Bath House, A Book of Ghosts and Goblins and A Choice of Magic
- The Hat, A Book of Charms and Changelings
- The Haunted Castle, The Haunted Castle
- The Lake, A Book of Spooks and Spectres
- Water Drops, A Book of Ghosts and Goblins

== Ethiopia ==
- Hare's Ears, Tortoise Tales

== Finland ==
- The fish cart, Fox Tales
- The Flute Player, A Book of Charms and Changelings
- Rabbit and Our Old Woman, Tortoise Tales
- Something Wonderful, A Book of Devils and Demons and Folk and Fairy Tales
- The well, Fox Tales

== Flanders ==
- Rich Woman, Poor Woman, A Book of Wizards

== France ==
- The Antmolly Birds, Jonnikin and the Flying Basket: French Folk and Fairy Tales
- The Beauty and Her Gallant, A Book of Ghosts and Goblins
- The Broken Pitcher, Old Witch Boneyleg
- The Dapple Horse, A Book of Magic Horses
- The Gold Dragoon, Jonnikin and the Flying Basket: French Folk and Fairy Tales
- The Handsome Apprentice, Jonnikin and the Flying Basket: French Folk and Fairy Tales
- Jonnikin and the Flying Basket, Jonnikin and the Flying Basket: French Folk and Fairy Tales
- The King of the Crows, Jonnikin and the Flying Basket: French Folk and Fairy Tales
- The Leg of Gold, A Book of Ghosts and Goblins
- The Little Milleress, Jonnikin and the Flying Basket: French Folk and Fairy Tales
- The Magic Wand, Jonnikin and the Flying Basket: French Folk and Fairy Tales
- The Night of Four Times, Jonnikin and the Flying Basket: French Folk and Fairy Tales
- The Nine White Sheep, Jonnikin and the Flying Basket: French Folk and Fairy Tales
- Pappa Greatnose, A Book of Ghosts and Goblins
- The Prince of the Seven Golden Cows, Jonnikin and the Flying Basket: French Folk and Fairy Tales
- Princess Felicity, A Book of Princes and Princesses
- The Small Men and the Weaver, Jonnikin and the Flying Basket: French Folk and Fairy Tales
- The Snake Monster, Jonnikin and the Flying Basket: French Folk and Fairy Tales
- The Son of the King of Spain, Jonnikin and the Flying Basket: French Folk and Fairy Tales
- The Sword of the Stone, Jonnikin and the Flying Basket: French Folk and Fairy Tales
- Tam and Tessa, Jonnikin and the Flying Basket: French Folk and Fairy Tales
- The Thirteen Flies, Jonnikin and the Flying Basket: French Folk and Fairy Tales
- The Young Shepherd, Jonnikin and the Flying Basket: French Folk and Fairy Tales

== French Canada ==
- Jon and his Brothers, A Book of Magic Animals and Folk and Fairy Tales

== Gascony ==
- The Blacksmith and the Devil, A Book of Devils and Demons

== Georgia ==
- The Giant and the Dwarf, A Book of Giants

== Germany ==
- The Brave Little Tailor, A Book of Giants
- The Cobbler and the Dwarfs, A Book of Dwarfs
- The Comb, the Flute and the Spinning Wheel, A Book of Mermaids
- The Curse of the Very Small Man, A Book of Enchantments and Curses
- The Dancing Pigs, Old Witch Boneyleg
- The Donkey Lettuce, A Book of Witches
- The Dragon and His Grandmother, A Book of Dragons
- Elsa and the Bear, A Book of Magic Animals
- Fir Cones, A Book of Dwarfs
- The Girl Who Picked Strawberries, A Book of Dwarfs and A Choice of Magic
- The Gold Stag, Old Witch Boneyleg
- The Golden Kingdom, The Haunted Castle
- Ha! ha! ha!, A Book of Spooks and Spectres
- Hansel and Gretel, A Book of Witches
- The Imp Cat, A Book of Cats and Creatures
- The Inn of the Stone and Spectre, A Book of Spooks and Spectres
- Katchen the Cat, A Book of Cats and Creatures
- Lazy Hans, A Book of Witches
- The Little Tailor and the Three Dogs, A Book of Ogres and Trolls and Folk and Fairy Tales
- Mannikin Spanalong, A Book of Sorcerers and Spells
- Peter, A Book of Enchantments and Curses
- The queen in the garden, The Haunted Castle
- Rapunzel, A Book of Witches
- Snow White and the Seven Dwarfs, A Book of Dwarfs
- Tangletop, A Book of Spooks and Spectres
- The Three Dogs, A Book of Dragons
- The Three Golden Hairs of the King of the Cave Giants, A Book of Giants
- The Three Little Men in the Wood, A Book of Dwarfs
- Thumbkin, A Book of Dwarfs
- The very little man, Fox Tales

== Greece ==
- Alas!, Damian and the Dragon: Modern Greek Folk-Tales
- The Bay-Tree Maiden, Damian and the Dragon: Modern Greek Folk-Tales
- The Beardless One, Damian and the Dragon: Modern Greek Folk-Tales
- Big Matsiko, Damian and the Dragon: Modern Greek Folk-Tales
- The Cats, Damian and the Dragon: Modern Greek Folk-Tales
- Constantes and the Dragon, A Book of Dragons and A Choice of Magic
- The Cunning Old Man and the Three Rogues, Damian and the Dragon: Modern Greek Folk-Tales
- Damian and the Dragon, Damian and the Dragon: Modern Greek Folk-Tales
- The Dragon of the Well, A Book of Dragons
- The Four Fishes, Damian and the Dragon: Modern Greek Folk-Tales
- The Golden Casket, Damian and the Dragon: Modern Greek Folk-Tales
- The King's Beard, Old Witch Boneyleg
- The Lion, the Tiger and the Eagle, Damian and the Dragon: Modern Greek Folk-Tales
- Luck, Damian and the Dragon: Modern Greek Folk-Tales
- The Melodious Napkin, Damian and the Dragon: Modern Greek Folk-Tales
- My Candlestick, Damian and the Dragon: Modern Greek Folk-Tales
- My Lady Sea, Damian and the Dragon: Modern Greek Folk-Tales
- The Nine Doves, A Book of Dragons and A Choice of Magic
- Penteclemas and the Pea, Damian and the Dragon: Modern Greek Folk-Tales
- Pepito, A Book of Dragons
- The Prince and the Vizier's Son, Damian and the Dragon: Modern Greek Folk-Tales
- The Sleeping Prince, Damian and the Dragon: Modern Greek Folk-Tales
- The Sneezing Ring, The Three Witch Maidens
- The Three Precepts, Damian and the Dragon: Modern Greek Folk-Tales
- The Twins, Damian and the Dragon: Modern Greek Folk-Tales
- The Wild Man, Damian and the Dragon: Modern Greek Folk-Tales
- Yiankos, Damian and the Dragon: Modern Greek Folk-Tales

== Greek Isles ==
- Selim and the Snake Queen, A Book of Kings and Queens and Folk and Fairy Tales

== Gypsy ==
- Bald Pate, The Red King and the Witch: Gypsy Folk and Fairy Tales
- The Black Dog of the Wild Forest, The Red King and the Witch: Gypsy Folk and Fairy Tales
- Brian and the Fox, The Red King and the Witch: Gypsy Folk and Fairy Tales
- The Brigands and the Miller's Daughter, The Red King and the Witch: Gypsy Folk and Fairy Tales
- The Deluded Dragon, The Red King and the Witch: Gypsy Folk and Fairy Tales
- The Dog and the Maiden, The Red King and the Witch: Gypsy Folk and Fairy Tales
- The Dragon and the Stepmother, The Red King and the Witch: Gypsy Folk and Fairy Tales
- Fedor and the Fairy, A Book of Charms and Changelings
- The Foam Maiden, A Book of Sorcerers and Spells
- Happy Boz'll, The Red King and the Witch: Gypsy Folk and Fairy Tales
- The Hen That Laid Diamond Eggs, The Red King and the Witch: Gypsy Folk and Fairy Tales
- It All Comes To Light, The Red King and the Witch: Gypsy Folk and Fairy Tales
- Jack and His Golden Snuff-Box, The Red King and the Witch: Gypsy Folk and Fairy Tales
- Jankyn and the Witch, The Red King and the Witch: Gypsy Folk and Fairy Tales
- The Little Bull-Calf, The Red King and the Witch: Gypsy Folk and Fairy Tales
- The Little Fox, The Red King and the Witch: Gypsy Folk and Fairy Tales
- The Little Nobleman, The Red King and the Witch: Gypsy Folk and Fairy Tales
- An Old King and His Three Sons of England, The Red King and the Witch: Gypsy Folk and Fairy Tales
- The Old Soldier and the Mischief, The Red King and the Witch: Gypsy Folk and Fairy Tales
- The Red King and the Witch, The Red King and the Witch: Gypsy Folk and Fairy Tales
- The Riddle, The Red King and the Witch: Gypsy Folk and Fairy Tales
- The Snake, The Red King and the Witch: Gypsy Folk and Fairy Tales
- Sylvester, The Red King and the Witch: Gypsy Folk and Fairy Tales
- The Tale of a Foolish Brother and of a Wonderful Bush, The Red King and the Witch: Gypsy Folk and Fairy Tales
- The Three Princesses and the Unclean Spirit, The Red King and the Witch: Gypsy Folk and Fairy Tales
- The Tinker and His Wife, The Red King and the Witch: Gypsy Folk and Fairy Tales
- Tropsyn, The Red King and the Witch: Gypsy Folk and Fairy Tales

== Hanover ==
- The Porridge Pot, Sir Green Hat and the Wizard

== Hartz Mountains ==
- The Eighteen Soldiers, The Three Witch Maidens

== Holland ==
- The Sailor and the Devil, Folk and Fairy Tales

== Hungary ==
- The Adventures of Pengo, The Glass Man and the Golden Bird: Hungarian Folk and Fairy Tales
- The Cock and the Hen, The Glass Man and the Golden Bird: Hungarian Folk and Fairy Tales
- Dummling, The Glass Man and the Golden Bird: Hungarian Folk and Fairy Tales
- The Enchanted Prince, A Book of Princes and Princesses and A Choice of Magic
- The Fairy Helena, The Glass Man and the Golden Bird: Hungarian Folk and Fairy Tales
- The Fiddle, The Glass Man and the Golden Bird: Hungarian Folk and Fairy Tales
- Giant Babolna, Old Witch Boneyleg
- Gisella and the Goat, The Glass Man and the Golden Bird: Hungarian Folk and Fairy Tales
- The Glass Man and the Golden Bird, The Glass Man and the Golden Bird: Hungarian Folk and Fairy Tales
- A Handful of Hay, The Glass Man and the Golden Bird: Hungarian Folk and Fairy Tales
- Hans and His Master, A Book of Ghosts and Goblins and A Choice of Magic
- In the wolf pit, Fox Tales
- Ironhead, A Book of Devils and Demons
- Jack at Hell Gate, A Book of Devils and Demons
- Kate Contrary, The Glass Man and the Golden Bird: Hungarian Folk and Fairy Tales
- Little Firenko, The Glass Man and the Golden Bird: Hungarian Folk and Fairy Tales
- The Lost Children, The Glass Man and the Golden Bird: Hungarian Folk and Fairy Tales
- Melitsa the Beautiful, The Haunted Castle
- The Nine Peahens and the Golden Apples, The Glass Man and the Golden Bird: Hungarian Folk and Fairy Tales
- The Nine Ravens, The Three Witch Maidens
- The Peppercorn Oxen, A Book of Devils and Demons
- Prince Mirko, The Glass Man and the Golden Bird: Hungarian Folk and Fairy Tales
- The Ram with the Golden Fleece, The Glass Man and the Golden Bird: Hungarian Folk and Fairy Tales
- The Secret-Keeping Boy, The Glass Man and the Golden Bird: Hungarian Folk and Fairy Tales
- The Seven Simons, The Glass Man and the Golden Bird: Hungarian Folk and Fairy Tales
- The Silver Penny, A Book of Wizards and Folk and Fairy Tales
- The Spotted Cow, The Glass Man and the Golden Bird: Hungarian Folk and Fairy Tales
- The Three Lemons, The Glass Man and the Golden Bird: Hungarian Folk and Fairy Tales
- Uletka, The Glass Man and the Golden Bird: Hungarian Folk and Fairy Tales
- The Witch and the Swan Maiden, The Glass Man and the Golden Bird: Hungarian Folk and Fairy Tales
- The Wonderful Tree, The Glass Man and the Golden Bird: Hungarian Folk and Fairy Tales

== Iceland ==
- Cow Bu-cola, A Book of Ogres and Trolls
- Dilly-dilly-doh!, A Book of Spooks and Spectres
- The Farmer and the Water Fairies, Old Witch Boneyleg
- The Gold Knob, A Book of Ogres and Trolls
- The Headless Horseman, A Book of Ghosts and Goblins
- Jon and the Troll Wife, A Book of Ogres and Trolls
- The Lost Prince, A Book of Mermaids and Folk and Fairy Tales
- Sigurd the King's Son, A Book of Ogres and Trolls

== India ==
- Fox and Crocodile, Fox Tales
- A Game of Cards with the King of Demons, The Three Witch Maidens
- The good old man, the thief, and the ghost, The Haunted Castle
- The Kingdom of Ocean, A Book of Mermaids
- Little Hiram, A Choice of Magic
- Lucky or unlucky? Fox Tales
- The Monkey Nursemaid, A Book of Devils and Demons

== Ireland ==
- The Adventures of Billy MacDaniel, A Choice of Magic
- The Blackstairs Mountain, A Book of Witches
- Bottle Hill, A Book of Dwarfs and A Choice of Magic
- Conall Yellowclaw, A Book of Giants
- The Field of Ragwort, A Book of Dwarfs
- Fin M'Coul and Cucullin, A Book of Giants and Folk and Fairy Tales
- The Good Woman, A Book of Ghosts and Goblins
- The Great Bear of Orange, A Book of Sorcerers and Spells
- The Magic Lake, A Book of Mermaids and A Choice of Magic
- The Magical Tune, A Book of Mermaids
- The Palace of the Seven Little Hills, A Book of Sorcerers and Spells
- The Sleeper, A Book of Sorcerers and Spells
- The Strange Adventure of Paddy O'Toole, A Book of Ghosts and Goblins
- The Teapot Spout, A Book of Kings and Queens
- The Thirteenth Son of the King of Erin, A Book of Dragons
- Tritil, Litil, and the Birds, A Book of Ogres and Trolls

== Italy ==
- The Black Spectre, A Book of Spooks and Spectres (in South Tyrol)
- Cannetella, A Book of Wizards
- The Girl in the Basket, A Book of Ogres and Trolls and Folk and Fairy Tales
- The Magic Monkeys, A Book of Sorcerers and Spells
- Prunella, A Book of Witches
- The She-Bear, A Book of Princes and Princesses
- The Three Mermaids, A Book of Mermaids and A Choice of Magic
- The Three Silver Balls, A Book of Ghosts and Goblins

== Jamaica ==
- Beedul-a-bup!, A Book of Magic Horses
- Gar-room!, Tortoise Tales
- Sarah Winyan, A Book of Enchantments and Curses

== Japan ==
- The Little Jizo, Sir Green Hat and the Wizard
- My Lord Bag of Rice, A Book of Dragons and Folk and Fairy Tales
- Timimoto, A Book of Dwarfs

== Jutland ==
- Hans, the Horn, and the Magic Sword, A Book of Giants
- The Skipper and the Dwarfs, A Book of Dwarfs and Folk and Fairy Tales

== Kashmir ==
- Stupid Head, A Book of Princes and Princesses

== Korea ==
- The Enchanted Wine Jug, A Book of Charms and Changelings
- Strange Visitors, A Book of Spooks and Spectres
- Yi Chang and the Spectres, A Book of Spooks and Spectres

== Latvia ==
- Monster Grabber and the King's Daughter, A Book of Magic Horses

== Macedonia ==
- The Monster in the Mill, A Book of Monsters and Folk and Fairy Tales
- Pentalina, A Book of Monsters
- Yanni, A Book of Dragons

== Madagascar ==
- The Monster with Seven Heads, A Book of Kings and Queens and Folk and Fairy Tales
- Oh Mr Crocodile, A Book of Cats and Creatures

== Mallorca ==
- A Box on the Ear, A Book of Ghosts and Goblins
- The Dolphin, A Book of Magic Animals

== Mediterranean Sea ==
- A-tishoo!, Gianni and the Ogre
- Bardiello, Gianni and the Ogre
- The Bean Tree, Gianni and the Ogre
- Celery, Gianni and the Ogre
- The Daughter of the Dwarf, Gianni and the Ogre
- The Doll, Gianni and the Ogre
- The Fiddler Going Home, Gianni and the Ogre
- Gianni and the Ogre, Gianni and the Ogre
- Grillo, Gianni and the Ogre
- Kabadaluk, Gianni and the Ogre
- King Fox, Gianni and the Ogre
- Little Finger, Gianni and the Ogre
- Mother Sunday, Gianni and the Ogre
- Oudelette, Gianni and the Ogre
- Peppino, Gianni and the Ogre
- The Spider, Gianni and the Ogre
- The Three Ravens, Gianni and the Ogre
- Trim Tram Turvey, Gianni and the Ogre

== Mongolia ==
- The Blue-grey Fleece, Sir Green Hat and the Wizard

== Netherlands ==
- Malegy's Palfrey, A Book of Magic Horses

== New Zealand ==
- Tawhaki, The Three Witch Maidens

== Norse and/or Norway ==
- Farmer Weathersky, A Book of Wizards
- Freddy and his Fiddle, A Book of Dwarfs
- The Giant Who Had No Heart in His Body, A Book of Giants and Folk and Fairy Tales
- The Hill Demon, A Book of Devils and Demons
- Tatterhood, A Book of Witches and A Choice of Magic

== North Africa ==
- The Mossy Rock, A Book of Sorcerers and Spells

== Nova Scotia ==
- Fox and Hare, Fox Tales

== Poland ==
- The Adventures of Gregor, A Book of Magic Horses
- The Cat Johann, A Book of Cats and Creatures

== Pomerania ==
- The Cow, The Three Witch Maidens
- Dear Grey, The Haunted Castle
- Father Wren and King Tiger, A Book of Cats and Creatures
- The Glassy Bridge, Sir Green Hat and the Wizard
- The gold spinner, The Haunted Castle
- A Lying Story, A Book of Enchantments and Curses
- The Two Enemy Kings, A Book of Kings and Queens
- The Queen's Ring, A Book of Enchantments and Curses

== Portugal ==
- The Geese and the Golden Chain, A Book of Mermaids

== Romania ==
- Prince Loaf, A Book of Giants and A Choice of Magic
- Stan Bolovan, A Book of Dragons and A Choice of Magic

== Rügen ==
- The Silver Bell, A Book of Dwarfs

== Russia ==
- Bull's Winter House, A Book of Magic Animals
- Catrinella, Come up Higher!, A Book of Enchantments and Curses
- The Children on the Pillar, A Book of Ogres and Trolls
- The Crane's Purse, Sir Green Hat and the Wizard
- Eh! Eh! Tralala!, A Book of Magic Animals
- Go I Know Not Whither and Fetch I Know Not What, A Book of Sorcerers and Spells
- The Goat in the Sky, A Book of Cats and Creatures
- The Good Ogre, A Book of Ogres and Trolls
- The Great Golloping Wolf, A Book of Monsters
- King Eagle, A Book of Kings and Queens
- Kojata, A Book of Wizards
- Little Cat and Little Hen, Tortoise Tales
- The Little Humpbacked Horse, A Book of Magic Animals
- Little Sister Fox, Tortoise Tales
- Monster Copper Forehead, A Book of Monsters
- Nanny Goat with Nuts, Tortoise Tales
- Natasha Most Lovely, Old Witch Boneyleg
- Old Man Zackery and the Cranes, A Book of Cats and Creatures
- Old Verlooka, A Choice of Magic
- Old Witch Boneyleg, Old Witch Boneyleg
- Pancakes and Pies, A Book of Charms and Changelings
- A Pool of Bright Water, A Book of Cats and Creatures
- The Queen's Children, A Book of Kings and Queens
- The Silver Dish, The Three Witch Maidens
- The Spooks' Party, A Book of Spooks and Spectres
- The Straw Horse, A Book of Magic Horses
- The Three Ivans, A Book of Sorcerers and Spells
- Two Minutes, Old Witch Boneyleg
- The Twins and the Snarling Witch, A Book of Witches
- Umbrella, Fox Tales
- Vanka, Sir Green Hat and the Wizard
- Vasilissa Most Lovely, A Book of Enchantments and Curses and Folk and Fairy Tales
- Vanooshka, A Book of Kings and Queens
- Whoa-ho!, A Book of Magic Horses
- Wits But No Money, A Book of Magic Horses
- The Wizard King, A Book of Princes and Princesses
- A Wonderful Bird, A Book of Cats and Creatures
- The Wonderful Shirt, A Choice of Magic

== Savoy ==
- The Dance of the Spectres, A Book of Spooks and Spectres

== Schleswig-Holstein ==
- The New Horse, A Book of Magic Horses
- Tummeldink, A Book of Spooks and Spectres

== Scotland ==
- The Black Bull of Norroway, Scottish Folk Tales
- Conall Yellowclaw, A Book of Giants
- Flitting, Scottish Folk Tales
- The Giant in the Cave, A Book of Giants
- Green caps, Scottish Folk Tales
- In a sack, Scottish Folk Tales
- The Laird of Co, Scottish Folk Tales
- The little wee man, Scottish Folk Tales
- The Loch Ness Kelpie, Scottish Folk Tales
- Mester Stoorworm, Scottish Folk Tales
- Merman Rosmer, A Book of Mermaids and Folk and Fairy Tales
- My own self, Scottish Folk Tales
- The seal-hunter and the mermen, Scottish Folk Tales
- The seal-wife, Scottish Folk Tales
- Seven Inches, Scottish Folk Tales
- The shadow, Scottish Folk Tales
- Short Hoggers, Scottish Folk Tales
- The Strange Visitor, Scottish Folk Tales
- The Tailor in the Church, A Book of Ghosts and Goblins
- The Untidy Mermaid, A Book of Mermaids
- The wee bit mousikie, Scottish Folk Tales
- The Well at the World's End, Scottish Folk Tales
- Whirra whirra bump!, Scottish Folk Tales

== Serbia ==
- The Prince and the Dragons, A Book of Princes and Princesses

== Siberia ==
- The Bird Wife, A Book of Cats and Creatures
- The Maiden Suvarna, A Book of Ghosts and Goblins

== Sicily ==
- The All-seeing Sun, Sir Green Hat and the Wizard
- Aniello, A Book of Wizards and A Choice of Magic
- The Beauty of the Golden Star, A Book of Magic Horses
- Dough, A Book of Kings and Queens
- The Goat in Bed, The Three Witch Maidens
- The Golden Valley, A Book of Monsters
- The Green Bird, A Book of Ogres and Trolls
- The Ogre's Breath, A Book of Ogres and Trolls
- Peppi, A Book of Charms and Changelings
- Rags and Tatters, A Book of Princes and Princesses
- Unfortunate, A Book of Enchantments and Curses

== Silesia ==
- Rubizal, A Book of Charms and Changelings

== Slavic ==
- The Dwarf with the Long Beard, A Book of Charms and Changelings
- Gold Lambs and Silver Lambs, Sir Green Hat and the Wizard
- King Johnny, A Book of Giants and A Choice of Magic
- The Prince with the Golden Hand, A Book of Dragons

== Slavonia ==
- The old woman and the oak tree, The Haunted Castle

== South Africa ==
- Voo-too-koo, Sir Green Hat and the Wizard (also listed as a Zulu tale)

== South America ==
- The King of the Vultures, The Three Witch Maidens
- The Magic Roots, Folk and Fairy Tales

== Spain ==
- Black, Red, and Gold, A Book of Enchantments and Curses
- Bring me a Light, A Book of Ghosts and Goblins
- The Knights of the Fish, A Book of Enchantments and Curses and Folk and Fairy Tales
- The Ring, A Book of Ghosts and Goblins

== Sudan ==
- Foni and Fotia, A Book of Sorcerers and Spells

== Sweden ==
- The Juniper Bush, A Book of Cats and Creatures
- Lassy my Boy!, The Three Witch Maidens
- Lilla Rosa, A Book of Magic Animals and Folk and Fairy Tales
- Prince Lindworm, A Book of Monsters

== Switzerland ==
- The Enchanted Candle, A Book of Enchantments and Curses
- The Owl, A Book of Spooks and Spectres
- Pussy Cat Twinkle, A Book of Cats and Creatures

== Tadjakistan ==
- The Big Bird Katchka, A Book of Cats and Creatures

== Tartary ==
- The Golden Knucklebone, A Book of Cats and Creatures
- Ubir, A Book of Monsters

== Transylvania ==
- The Demon's Daughter, A Book of Devils and Demons
- Iron Hans, Old Witch Boneyleg
- The Princess in the Mountain, A Book of Enchantments and Curses
- Sausages, Folk and Fairy Tales
- Sorcerer Kaldoon, A Book of Sorcerers and Spells
- The Story of the Three Young Shepherds, A Book of Monsters
- The Sun Mother, A Book of Charms and Changelings
- The Three Witch Maidens, The Three Witch Maidens

== Turkey ==
- Buns and honey, Fox Tales
- Over the wall, Fox Tales

== Tyrol ==
- Gold, A Book of Wizards
- The Singing Leaves, A Book of Monsters
- The Skull, A Book of Ghosts and Goblins
- Spooks a-hunting, A Book of Spooks and Spectres

== Ukraine ==
- The Frog, A Book of Princes and Princesses and A Choice of Magic

== United States ==
- La-lee-lu, A Book of Spooks and Spectres
- Long John and the Mermaid, A Book of Mermaids
- The Small, Small Cat, A Book of Cats and Creatures
- The Spectre Wolf, A Book of Spooks and Spectres

== Valley of the Nile ==
- The Forty Goats, A Book of Charms and Changelings
- The Good Oum-Aly, The Three Witch Maidens

== Wales ==
- Jack and the Wizard, A Book of Wizards and A Choice of Magic
- The Lake Maiden, A Book of Mermaids

== West Africa ==
- Lu-bo-bo, A Book of Monsters

== Yugoslavia ==
- The Little Old Man in the Tree, A Book of Spooks and Spectres
- The Prince and the Sky-Blue Filly, A Book of Princes and Princesses

== Zeeland ==
- Knurremurre, A Book of Dwarfs and A Choice of Magic

== Zulu ==
- Voo-too-koo, Sir Green Hat and the Wizard (also listed as a South African tale)
