= David Scott Daniell =

- Born: 1 July 1906; London, England
- Died: 29 August 1965 (aged 59); Dorset
- Education: Bedford Modern School

David Scott Daniell (1 July 1906 – 29 August 1965), was an English writer, historian and journalist. He wrote fiction for adults and children, regimental histories and scripts for radio, television and film. His books for children were illustrated by some of the best artists of his day including William Stobbs, Colin Spencer and George Adamson. Over his career, Scott Daniell published 98 works that are now held in 1955 libraries around the world.

== Early life ==
Albert Scott Daniell was born on 1 July 1906 and educated at Bedford Modern School. His first novel, Young English, was a recollection of his time at the school. He was later known by his pseudonym David Scott Daniell.

== Career ==
Scott Daniell wrote as David Scott Daniell, Albert Scott Daniell, Richard Bowood and John Lewesdon. He published his first novel as David Scott Daniell in 1940 after which he served as a captain in the Royal Engineers during World War II and was mentioned in despatches. His later work encompassed fiction, non-fiction (including several regimental histories) and scripts for television, film and radio. He wrote 26 non-fiction titles for Ladybird Books from 1958 until his death, seven as David Scott Daniell and 19 as Richard Bowood. He was selected by Sir Winston Churchill to write a history of the 4th Queen's Own Hussars, Sir Winston's former regiment.

== Family life ==
In 1939 Scott Daniell married Elizabeth Mary Thirlby. They had one son, Richard John Scott Daniell. Scott Daniell died in Dorset on 29 August 1965.

== Selected bibliography ==
Cover for David Scott Daniell's Sandro's Battle

=== Novels as A. Scott Daniell ===
- Young English. The story of a schoolboy. London, Jonathan Cape, 1931

=== Novels as David Scott Daniell ===
- Mornings at Seven. London, Jonathan Cape, 1940
- The Time of the Singing. London, Jonathan Cape, 1941
- Nicholas Wilde. London, Jonathan Cape, 1948
- Mission for Oliver, illustrated by William Stobbs. London, Jonathan Cape, 1953
- Polly and Oliver, illustrated by William Stobbs. London, Jonathan Cape, 1954
- The Dragon and the Rose, illus. Sheila Stratton. London, Jonathan Cape, 1955
- Hunt Royal, illustrated by William Stobbs. London, Jonathan Cape, 1958
- Hideaway Johnny, illustrated by Val Biro. Leicester, Brockhampton Press, 1959
- Fifty Pounds for a Dead Parson. London, Jonathan Cape, 1960
- The Golden Pomegranate, illustrated by George Adamson. London, University of London Press, 1960
- Polly and Oliver at Sea, illustrated by William Stobbs. London, Jonathan Cape, 1960; as The Rajah's Treasure, New York City, Duell, Sloan & Pearce, 1960
- By Jiminy, illus. D. G. Valentine. Leicester, Brockhampton Press, 1962
- Sandro's Battle, illustrated by Colin Spencer. London, Jonathan Cape, 1962
- Polly and Oliver Besieged, illustrated by William Stobbs. London, Jonathan Cape, 1963
- Saved by Jiminy, illustrated by D. G. Valentine. Leicester, Brockhampton Press, 1963
- By Jiminy Ahoy, illustrated by D. G. Valentine. Leicester, Brockhampton Press, 1963
- By Jiminy in the Jungle, illustrated by D. G. Valentine. Leicester, Brockhampton Press, 1964
- Polly and Oliver Pursued, illustrated by William Stobbs. London, Jonathan Cape, 1964
- By Jiminy in the Highlands, illustrated by D. G. Valentine. Leicester, Brockhampton Press, 1966

=== Novels as Richard Bowood ===
- Horsey & Co. and the Bank Robbers. London, Golden Pleasure Books, 1965
- Red Gaskell's Gold. London, Macmillan & Co., 1964

=== Non-fiction as David Scott Daniell ===
Cover for David Scott Daniell's Your Body

- Cap of Honour: The story of the Gloucestershire Regiment (the 28th/61st Foot) 1694–1950; with a foreword by the Duke of Gloucester. London, George G. Harrap and Co., 1951
- Regimental History: The Royal Hampshire Regiment, Vol. III: 1918–54. Aldershot, Gale & Polden, 1955
- History of the East Surrey Regiment, Vol. IV: 1920–1952. London, Ernest Benn Limited, 1957.
- Flight One: Australia, illus. Jack Matthew. Loughborough, Ladybird Books 1958
- 4th Hussar: The story of the 4th Queen's Own Hussars, 1685–1948. Aldershot, Gale & Polden, 1959
- The Boy They Made King. A true story for boys and girls, illus. William Stobbs. London, Jonathan Cape, 1959.
- Flight Two: Canada, illus. Jack Matthew. Loughborough, Wills & Hepworth (Ladybird Books), 1959.
- Flight Three: United States of America, illus. Jack Matthew. Loughborough, Wills & Hepworth (Ladybird Books), 1959.
- Flight Four: India, illus. Jack Matthew. Loughborough, Wills & Hepworth (Ladybird Books), 1960.
- Battles and Battlefields, illus. William Stobbs, London, B. T. Batsford, 1961.
- Discovering the Bible, with G. W. H. Lampe; illus. Graham Oakley. London, University of London Press, 1961; illus. Steele Savage, Nashville, TN, Abingdon, 1966.
- Faith in Our Fathers: The story of Christianity in Britain, with G. W. H. Lampe. London, University of London Press, 1961.
- Flight Five: Africa, illus. Jack Matthew. Loughborough, Wills & Hepworth (Ladybird Books), 1961.
- Explorers and Exploration, illus. William Stobbs. London, B. T. Batsford, 1962.
- Flight Six: The Holy Land, illus. Jack Matthew. Loughborough, Wills & Hepworth (Ladybird Books), 1962.
- World War 1: An illustrated history. London, E. Benn, 1965.
- Discovering the Army, illus. Crispin Fisher. London, University of London Press, 1965.
- Soldiers. London, 1965.
- Sea Fights. London, B. T. Batsford, 1966.
- World War 2: An illustrated history. London, E. Benn, 1966.
- Your Body, illus. Ronald Lampitt. Loughborough, Wills & Hepworth (Ladybird Books), 1967.

=== Non-fiction as Richard Bowood ===
Cover for Richard Bowood's The Story of Our Churches and Cathedrals

- The Story of Flight, illus. Robert Ayton. Loughborough, Wills & Hepworth (Ladybird Books), 1960.
- Great Inventions, illus. Robert Ayton. Loughborough, Wills & Hepworth (Ladybird Books), 1961.
- The Story of Railways, illus. Robert Ayton. Loughborough, Wills & Hepworth (Ladybird Books), 1961.
- The Story of Ships, illus. Robert Ayton. Loughborough, Wills & Hepworth (Ladybird Books), 1961.
- The Ladybird Book of the Weather, with F. E. Newing; illus. Robert Ayton. Loughborough, Wills & Hepworth (Ladybird Books), 1962.
- Light, Mirrors and Lenses, with F. E. Newing; illus. J. H. Wingfield. Loughborough, Wills & Hepworth (Ladybird Books), 1962.
- Magnets, Bulbs and Batteries, with F. E. Newing; illus. J. H. Wingfield. Loughborough, Wills & Hepworth (Ladybird Books), 1962.
- Air Wind and Flight, with F. E. Newing; illus. J. H. Wingfield. Loughborough, Wills & Hepworth (Ladybird Books), 1963.
- Levers, Pulleys and Engines, with F. E. Newing; illus. J. H. Wingfield. Loughborough, Wills & Hepworth (Ladybird Books), 1963.
- The Story of Houses and Homes, illus. Robert Ayton. Loughborough, Wills & Hepworth (Ladybird Books), 1963.
- The Story of Our Churches and Cathedrals, illus. Robert Ayton. Loughborough, Wills & Hepworth (Ladybird Books), 1964.
- The Story of Clothes and Costume, illus. Robert Ayton. Loughborough, Wills & Hepworth (Ladybird Books), 1964.
- Soldiers, Soldiers. London, Paul Hamlyn, 1965.
- Animals and How They Live, with F. E. Newing; illus. Ronald Lampitt. Loughborough, Wills & Hepworth (Ladybird Books), 1965.
- Plants and How They Grow, with F. E. Newing; illus. Ronald Lampitt. Loughborough, Wills & Hepworth (Ladybird Books), 1965.
- Birds and How They Live, with F. E. Newing; illus. Ronald Lampitt. Loughborough, Wills & Hepworth (Ladybird Books), 1966.
- Our Land in the Making, Vol 1: Earliest Times to the Norman Conquest, illus. Ronald Lampitt. Loughborough, Wills & Hepworth (Ladybird Books), 1966.
- Our Land in the Making, Vol 2: Norman Conquest to present day, illus. Ronald Lampitt. Loughborough, Wills & Hepworth (Ladybird Books), 1966.
- Underwater Exploration, illus. B. Knight. Loughborough, Wills & Hepworth (Ladybird Books), 1967.
