= Sir Green Hat and the Wizard =

1974 anthology by Ruth Manning-Sanders

- First edition
- Author: Ruth Manning-Sanders
- Illustrator: William Stobbs
- Cover artist: William Stobbs
- Language: English
- Genre: Fairy Tales
- Publisher: Methuen & Co. Ltd.
- Publication date: 1974
- Publication place: Great Britain
- Media type: Print (hardcover)
- Pages: 173 pp
- ISBN: 9780416779004
- OCLC: 868835

Sir Green Hat and the Wizard is a 1974 anthology of 14 fairy tales from around the world that have been collected and retold by Ruth Manning-Sanders. It is one in a long series of such anthologies by Manning-Sanders.

== Table of contents ==
- 1. Sir Green Hat and the Wizard (Denmark)
- 2. The Little Jizo (Japan)
- 3. The Tailor and the Hunter (Austria)
- 4. The Porridge Pot (Hanover)
- 5. The Blue-grey Fleece (Mongolia)

1. The Old Man and Woman
2. The Yellow-headed Swans

- 6. The Crane's Purse (Russia)
- 7. Voo-too-koo (Zulu, South Africa)
- 8. Hassan the Ropemaker (Arabia)
- 9. The All-seeing Sun (Sicily)
- 10. Pippi Menou and the Hanging Palace (Brittany)
- 11. Plain Peter (Bavaria)
- 12. The Glassy Bridge (Pomerania)
- 13. Gold Lambs and Silver Lambs (Slavonia)
- 14. Vanka (Russia)
