= A Cauldron of Witches =

1988 book by Ruth Manning-Sanders

- First edition
- Author: Ruth Manning-Sanders
- Illustrator: Scoular Anderson
- Language: English
- Genre: Fairy Tales
- Publisher: Methuen & Co. Ltd.
- Publication date: 1988
- Publication place: Great Britain
- Media type: Print (hardcover)
- Pages: 127 pp
- ISBN: 0-416-05172-3

A Cauldron of Witches is a 1988 anthology of 12 fairy tales from around the world that have been collected and retold by Ruth Manning-Sanders. It was the final published book in a long series of such anthologies by author Manning-Sanders, who died in October 1988 at age 102.

== Table of contents ==
- Foreword
- 1. The Little Grey Donkey (Sweden)
- 2. The Amber Witch (Norway)
- 3. Witch Longnose and her Cat Periwinkle (Cornwall)
- 4. The Witch in the Wood (Germany)
- 5. Wolfgang and the Witches (Bohemia)
- 6. Tow-how and the Witch (Papua New Guinea)
- 7. Martin and the Lions (Tyrol)
- 8. The Giant on the Mount (France)
- 9. Elsa and the Witch (Russia)
- 10. The Witch's Flute (Bulgaria)
- 11. The Whirlwind's Castle (Finland)
- 12. Moti-katika and the Water Witch (South-east Africa)
