= The Wonderful Tune =

Irish fairy tale

Folk tale
- Name: The Wonderful Tune
- Country: Ireland
- Region: Munster
- Origin Date: 1825
- Published in: Fairy Tales and Traditions of the South of Ireland

The Wonderful Tune is an Irish fairy tale collected in Thomas Crofton Croker's Fairy Tales and Traditions of the South of Ireland (1825–28). Andrew Lang included it in The Lilac Fairy Book, and

Ruth Manning-Sanders included it as "The Magical Tune", in A Book of Mermaids.

== Synopsis ==
Maurice Connor, a blind man, was the finest piper in Munster, and knew a tune that when he played, it forced everyone to dance. One day at a wedding by the sea, he drank a great deal of whiskey, and foolishly began to play that tune. Everyone, and every creature down to the crabs, scallops and oysters, began to dance. A mermaid came dancing up out of the sea and persuaded him to marry her and live in the sea. He promised his old mother to send, every year, a piece of burned wood to Trafraska to show he was alive and well.

His mother died soon after the wedding, but the piece of burned wood drifted ashore every year for more than a century.

== Translations ==
Wilhelm Grimm's prepared the German translation Die wunderbare Melodie, but was excluded from Irische Elfenmärchen which was the translation of Croker's work. It was later edited using the manuscript copy, and printed in Irische Land- und Seemärchen (1986). The protagonist appears as "Moritz Connor".

A French translation entitled "L'air merveilleux" appeared in Loys Bruyere, Contes populaires de la Grande-Bretagne (1875).
