= Jens Kamp =

Danish folklorist (1845–1900)

Jens Kamp, born 11 February 1845 at Kamp-Hovedgård in Stadil parish in Jutland; died 23 May 1900 in Copenhagen, was a Danish folklorist.

Kamp attended elementary school and later Staby folk high school. In 1867, he obtained a school teacher's degree from Blågård. As a teacher at various folk high schools in years 1868–76 (Røgen, Høng, and Marielyst) he collected the material for Danske Folkeminder (1877). His later collections, gathered as a teacher at Bogø (1876–80) were published in two volumes of Danske Folkeæventyr (1879–91). His surviving papers, including a manuscript begun for a second collection of Danske Folkeminder, can be found at the Dansk Folkemindesamling at Royal Library of Denmark. From 1891 he lived in Copenhagen as a retired teacher.

== Sources ==
- Bricka, Carl Frederik. "94 (Dansk biografisk Lexikon / IX. Bind. Jyde - Køtschau)". runeberg.org (in Danish).
- "456 (Salmonsens konversationsleksikon / Anden Udgave / Bind XIII: Jernbaneret—Kirkeskat)". runeberg.org (in Danish).
