= My Own Self =

English fairy tale

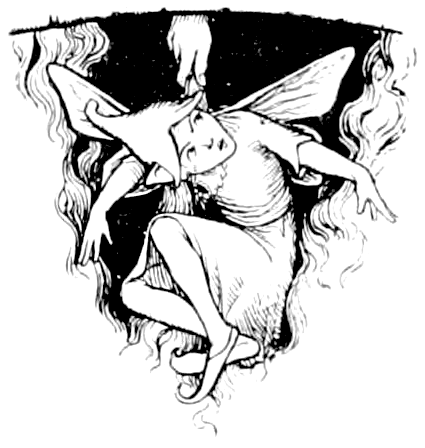

My Own Self, Me Aan Sel or Ainsel is a Northumbrian fairy tale collected by the folklorist Joseph Jacobs. A version of the tale appears in Scottish Folk Tales by Ruth Manning-Sanders. It is Aarne-Thompson type 1137 (Self Did It), similar to the encounter between Odysseus and Polyphemus. The story tells how a fairy is outsmarted by a human child through clever wordplay.

== Synopsis ==
A widow lived with her son in a cottage with many "Good Folk" (elves or fairies) living about it. One night her son would not go to bed, so she went to sleep on her own. A small fairy girl came down the chimney and told him that her name was "My Own Self", and the boy told her that he was "Just my own self too." They played together for a time, and when he stirred up the fire a spark landed on her foot and made her cry out. Her mother's voice came down the chimney, demanding to know what had happened, and the girl said "Just my own self" had burned her foot. Her mother told her that if she herself did it then she shouldn't make such a fuss about it, and a long arm came down the chimney to pull the girl back up. The boy was so frightened that he learned his lesson and went to bed when his mother told him to.
