= Kate Crackernuts =

Scottish fairy tale

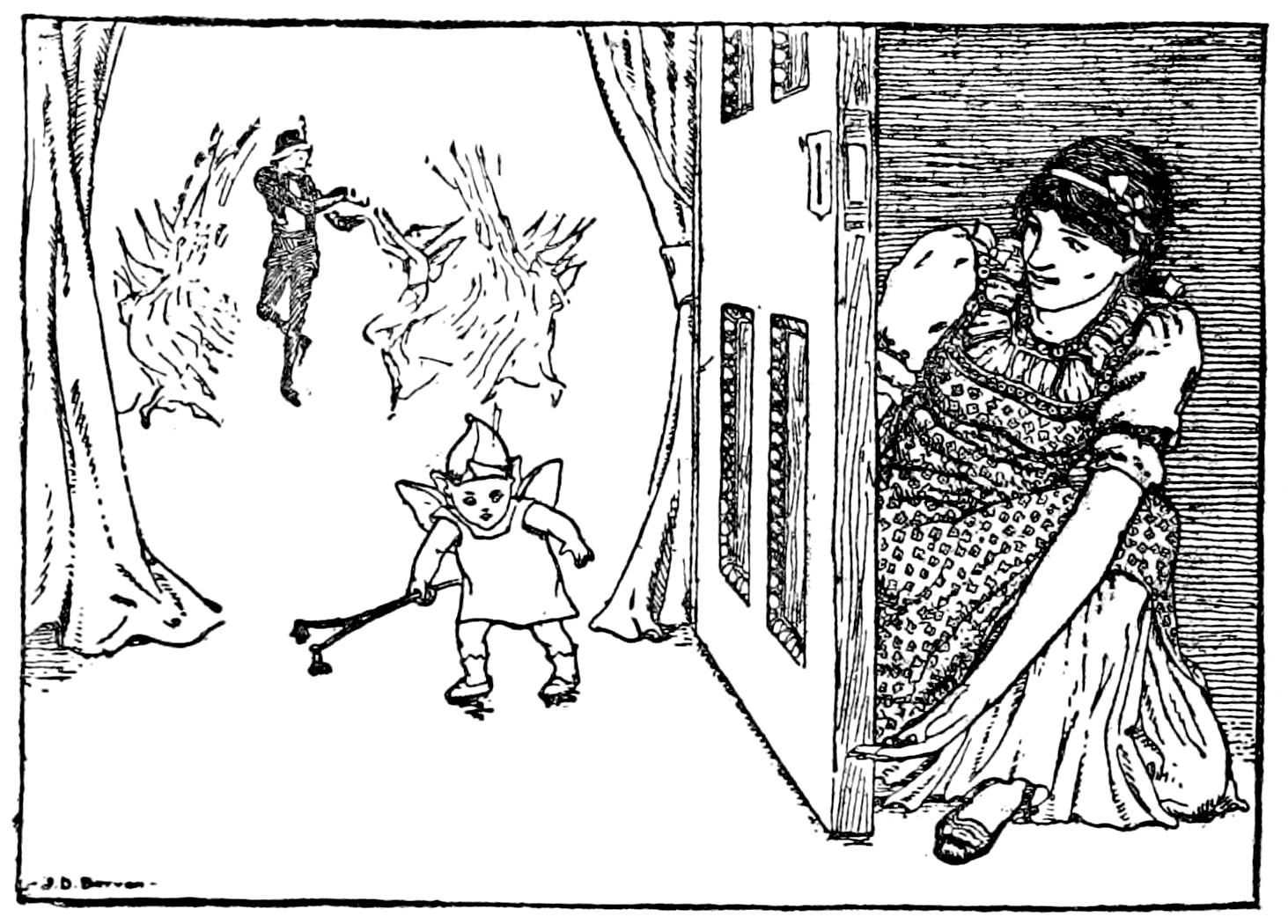
- Kate and the Fairy Baby

Folk tale
- Name: Kate Crackernuts
- Also known as: Katie Crackernuts
- Aarne–Thompson grouping: 306, 711
- Country: Scotland
- Region: Orkney Islands
- Published in: Longman's Magazine (1889); English Fairy Tales (1890); A Book of British Fairy Tales
- Related: "The Twelve Dancing Princesses"

"Kate Crackernuts" (or "Katie Crackernuts") is a Scottish fairy tale collected by Andrew Lang in the Orkney Islands and published in Longman's Magazine in 1889. Joseph Jacobs edited and republished the tale in his English Fairy Tales (1890). The tale is about a princess who rescues her beautiful sister from an evil enchantment and a prince from a wasting sickness caused by dancing nightly with the fairies. The tale has been adapted to a children's novel and a stage play.

== Plot ==
A king had a daughter named Anne, and his queen had a daughter named Kate, who was less beautiful. (Jacobs' notes reveal that in the original story both girls were called Kate and that he had changed one's name to Anne.) The queen was jealous of Anne, but Kate loved her. The queen consulted with a henwife to ruin Anne's beauty, and after three tries, they enchanted Anne's head into a sheep's head. Kate wrapped Anne's head in a cloth, and they went out to seek their fortunes.

They found a castle of a king who had two sons, one of whom was sickening. Whoever watched him at night mysteriously vanished (the original never mentions anyone else watching over him), so the king offered silver to anyone who would watch him. Kate asked for shelter for herself and her "sick" sister, and offered to watch him. At midnight, the sick prince rose and rode off. Kate sneaked onto his horse and collected nuts as they rode through the woods. A green hill where the fairies were dancing opened to receive the prince, and Kate rode in with him unnoticed. The prince danced with the fairies until the morning before rushing back.

Kate offered to watch the prince a second night for gold. The second night passed as the first but Kate found a fairy baby in the hill. It played with a wand, and she heard fairies say that three strokes of the wand would cure Anne. So she rolled nuts to distract the baby and got the wand, then cured her sister.

The third night, Kate said she would stay only if she could marry the prince, and that night, the baby played with a bird, three bites of which would cure the sick prince. She distracted the baby with the nuts again to get it. As soon as they returned to the castle, she cooked it, and the prince was cured by eating it. Meanwhile, his brother had seen Anne and fell in love with her, so they all married — the sick brother to the well sister, and the well brother to the sick sister.

== Commentary ==
Maria Tatar, author of The Annotated Classic Fairy Tales, notes that "Kate Crackernuts" belongs to the "do or die" strain of fairy tales: a heroine is given a task to perform, and, if successful, she wins a prince, but, if unsuccessful, she loses her life. The tale touches upon the wicked stepmother theme but never fully develops it, and the green hill may be related to the Venusberg of Tannhäuser, or another site of pleasure. Unlike many popular tales, which are known from reworked literary forms, "Crackernuts" is very close to the oral tradition. It combines Aarne–Thompson types 306, the danced-out shoes, such as "The Twelve Dancing Princesses", and 711, the beautiful and the ugly twin, such as "Tatterhood".

The fairies' forcing young men and women to come to a revel every day and dance to exhaustion, and so waste away, was a common European belief. The actual disease involved appears to have been consumption (tuberculosis).

This tale is the closest analogue to The Twelve Dancing Princesses, but reverses the role, in that the heroine goes after the dancing prince, and also the tone: the princesses in The Twelve Dancing Princesses are always depicted as enjoying the dances, while in the much darker Kate Crackernuts, the prince is forced by the fairies to dance to exhaustion, and is an invalid by day.

Though the stepmother acts the usual part in a fairy tale, her part is unusually truncated, without the usual comeuppance served to evil-doers and the stepsisters show a solidarity that is uncommon even among full siblings in fairy tales.

The tale of Kate Crackernuts made its way into Anglo-American folklore.

== Adaptations ==
=== Literature ===
- Katharine Mary Briggs adapted the story for her children's novel, Kate Crackernuts.
- Sheila Callaghan adapted the story for her play, Kate Crackernuts.
- Amy Trent adapted the story in her new adult novel, Clever, Cursed, & Storied.

== Music ==
- Juan María Solare composed a piece called Kate Crackernuts (the Dancing Fairy), original for solo piano but with several additional instrumental versions (such as clarinet and cello duo). In its version for music box, this piece is included in the album Music Box Music (2016), label Janus Music & Sound: Kate Crackernuts (the Dancing Fairy) on Spotify

== Bibliography ==
- Hamilton, Mary. Kentucky Folktales: Revealing Stories, Truths, and Outright Lies. University Press of Kentucky. 2012. pp. 139–151. ISBN 978-0-8131-3600-4
