= Mogarzea and his Son =

Morgarzea and his Son

Folk tale
- Name: Morgarzea and his Son
- Mythology: Romanian
- Country: Romania

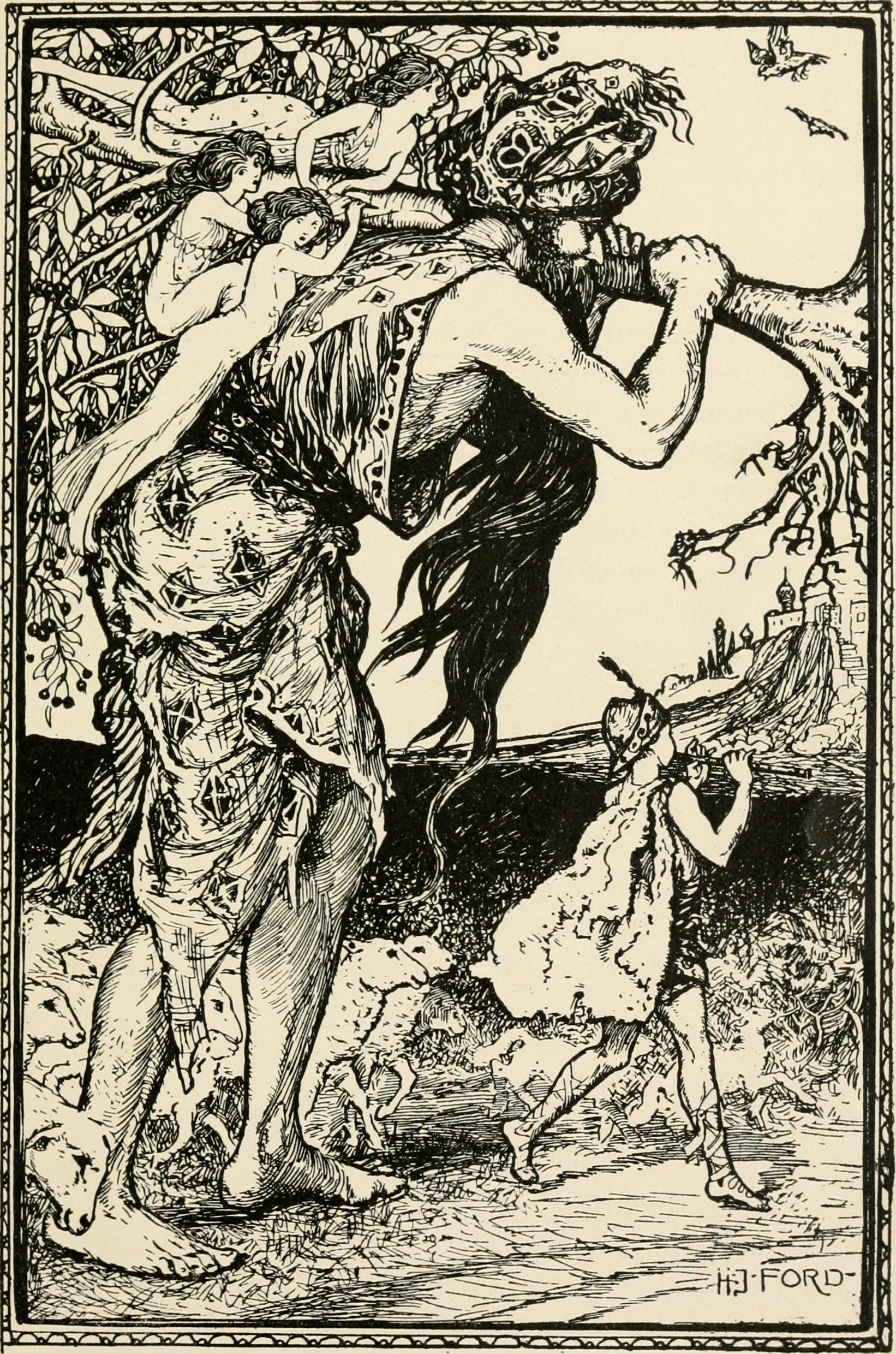
Illustration by H. J. Ford from Andrew Lang's Fairy Books

Mogarzea and his Son is a fairy tale included by Andrew Lang in The Violet Fairy Book. The source was Mite Kremnitz, Rumänische Märchen: Mogarzea und sein Sohn.

== Synopsis ==
A dying father and mother left the care of their son to a guardian, but the guardian wasted the money, so the son left him. He found a giant on his way and lay down to sleep beside him; in the morning, he claimed to be his son, born in the night. That day, he looked after the giant's sheep and in the evening, he asked the giant's tale. His name was Mogarzea, he was an emperor's son, and he was on his way to Sweet Milk Lake to marry one of the three fairies there when evil elves had stolen his soul.

The boy kept the sheep out of the elves' meadows, but one day, while he played the flute, one strayed over, and others followed. When he tried to drive them back, elves appeared and he had to play the flute for them to dance. They let him go at night but insisted he come back the next day.

Next evening, he dropped the flute and stepped on it, and lamented it, telling the elves that it was made from the heart of a cherry tree. The elves offered another cherry tree. He chopped the tree, tricked them into putting their fingers in, and pulled the ax out, so that they were trapped. They told him where to find Mogarzea's soul, and he brought it back to him. Then he and Mogarzea brought the tree with the elves back to Mogarzea's father's court.

At court, the boy asked Mogarzea how to marry a fairy of Sweet Milk Lake. Mogarzea told him. He went to the lake and played the flute. A fairy appeared and danced. On the third day, he plucked the rose from her hair and did not give it back, however she pled; so she married him at the emperor's court. But every year they and their children went back to Sweet Milk Lake to bathe.

== See also ==
- The Jezinkas
