= The Jezinkas =

Bohemian fairy tale

The Jezinkas is a Bohemian fairy tale collected by A. H. Wratislaw in his Sixty Folk-Tales from Exclusively Slavonic Sources, number 5. Parker Filmore included it, as Grandfather's Eyes, in Czechoslovak Fairy Tales. Ruth Manning-Sanders included, as Johnny and the Witch-Maidens in both A Book of Witches and A Choice of Magic.

== Synopsis ==
A poor orphan named Johnny (Jeníček) tried to get into service. He travelled far without finding a place. He came to an old man who had caverns in his head instead of eyes, and whose goats were bleating in their stall. The man took him as a goatherd but warned him against the hills: there, the three evil witches, known as the Jezinkas (Jeziňky), would put him to sleep and tear out his eyes.

For two days, Johnny obeyed him, but on the third day, he decided the pasture was better there. He took three shoots of bramble and drove the goats to the hill. A very beautiful and finely-dressed young maiden appeared, offering him an apple; he said he had eaten his fill of apples from his master's apple tree. Another appeared, with a rose, offering to let him smell it; he said he had smelled his fill of the more roses in his master's garden. A third one, who was the youngest and most beautiful of them, offered to comb his hair. He said nothing, but when she came close, he trapped her with the bramble shoot. The other two sisters came and could not undo it, and he then bound them as well despite their protests and weeping.

Johnny fetched his master. Taking the eldest of the Jezinka sisters, he demanded his master's eyes. When she said she did not know, he carried her to the river and threatened to throw her into it. Terrified, she brought him to a cave filled with eyes and gave him two. His master put them in but said he could see nothing but owls. Johnny then did throw the girl into the river and it was the end of her. He did the same with the middle sister, and when she gave his master eyes that saw nothing but wolves, he threw her, too, into the river. With the youngest of the sisters, after she gave his master eyes that saw nothing but pike, he went to drown her as well, but she pleaded with him and gave his master his actual eyes, and so he let her go; she was never seen around again.

== Analysis ==
=== Tale type ===
The tale is classified in the Aarne-Thompson-Uther Index as tale type ATU 321, "Eyes Recovered from Witch" or "The Stolen Eyes": a poor youth works for an elderly blind couple. The youth discovers the cause for the couple's blindness is due to the actions of evil witches or malevolent fairies.

=== Distribution ===
Scholarship locates variants of type 321 in the Baltic region, in Eastern Europe and in Southern Europe.

=== Combinations ===
The tale type appears merged with tale type ATU 301, "The Three Stolen Princesses", wherein the hero descends to a Lower World (Nether World or Underworld) by following a trail of blood or to rescue three princesses. In this combination, the hero heals the old man (woman or couple)'s eyes and has further adventures (usually tale type ATU 300, "The Dragonslayer"). This combination is reported to exist in Romanian, in East Slavic (in Belarusian and in Russian texts), and in Hungarian variants of the tale type (type 321*, "Vak öregek", translated as "Blind couple" or "The Blind Old Men").

== See also ==
- Mogarzea and his Son
