= Tatterhood =

Norwegian fairy tale

Folk tale
- Name: Tatterhood
- Also known as: Lurvehette
- Aarne–Thompson grouping: ATU 711 (The Ugly and the Beautiful Twin; The Beautiful and Ugly Twin Sisters)
- Region: Norway, Iceland
- Published in: Norske Folkeeventyr, by Peter Christen Asbjørnsen and Jørgen Moe
- Related: Kate Crackernuts

Tatterhood (Norwegian: Lurvehette) is a Norwegian fairy tale collected by Peter Christen Asbjørnsen and Jørgen Moe.

It is Aarne–Thompson type 711, the beautiful and the ugly twin. This tale type is quite common in Norway and Iceland and very rare elsewhere.

A version of the tale also appears in A Book of Witches and A Choice of Magic, by Ruth Manning-Sanders.

== Synopsis ==
A king and queen had no children, which grieved the queen greatly. To alleviate the queen's loneliness, they adopted a girl to raise as their own. One day, when the queen saw her adopted daughter playing with a beggar girl, she scolded her adopted daughter and tried to drive the other girl off. However, the beggar girl mentioned that her mother knows a way for the queen to become pregnant.

When the queen approached the beggar woman, the woman denies having such knowledge. The queen treated the woman to as much wine as the woman pleased until the woman is drunk. When the queen asked the drunk beggar woman how she could get a child of her own, the beggar woman told her to wash herself in two pails of water before going to bed, and afterward pour the water under the bed. The next morning, two flowers will have sprung up from under the bed: one fair and one rare. The beggar tells the queen that she must eat the beautiful one, but not to eat the hideous one no matter what. The queen followed this advice, and the next morning under the bed were two flowers. One was bright and lovely, and the other was black and foul. The queen ate the beautiful flower at once, but it tasted so sweet that she craved the other and ate it as well.

Not long afterward, the queen bore a child. She gave birth to a girl who carried a wooden spoon in her hand and rode upon a goat. She was very ugly and loud from the moment she was born. She was called "Tatterhood" because she wore a tattered hood over her unruly hair. The queen despaired about having such a daughter until the girl told her that her next child would be fair and agreeable. As the girl promised, the queen gave birth to a second daughter, one who was born fair and sweet, which pleased the queen very much. The sisters were as different as they could be, but they were very fond of each other.

One Christmas Eve, when the girls were half-grown, there was great noise in the gallery outside the queen's rooms. When Tatterhood demands to know what was causing the noise, the queen reluctantly reveals that it was a pack of trolls (in some versions, witches) who come to the palace every seven years. Tatterhood, being headstrong, decides to drive the trolls off and instructs her mother keep the door tightly shut. Worried about Tatterhood, Tatterhood's younger sister opens one of the doors during the battle with the trolls. Her head is instantly whipped off by a troll and replaced with a calf's head, after which the trolls were driven away.

To restore her sister's head, Tatterhood sets off in a ship with no crew or company aside from her own sister. They arrive at the island of the trolls and Tatterhood battles the trolls and successfully regains her sister's head. The sisters escape and arrive in a distant kingdom. The king, a widower with one son, fell in love with the younger sister at first sight. However, she declared she will not marry until Tatterhood does. The king begged his son to marry Tatterhood, and eventually he reluctantly agreed.

The two sisters were to be married to their grooms on the same day. The king, his young princess bride, and the king's son were regally adorned, while Tatterhood refused to dress up and happily wore her rags. As the couples rode to church to be married, Tatterhood asked her bridegroom why he did not ask why she rides a goat, and when he duly asked, she answered that she rode a grand horse, which it promptly becomes. She asked the prince why he does not ask why she carries a wooden spoon, which he asks, and she declares it to be a fan (or in some versions a wand), which it turns into. This is repeated with the tattered hood, which is turned into a golden crown, and with Tatterhood herself, whose beauty she declares to surpass her sister's, which it then does. The prince now understands that she chooses to appear ragged, and that her beauty matters not. He now is glad to be married to her.

== Analysis ==
=== Tale type ===
The tale is classified in the international Aarne-Thompson-Uther Index as type ATU 711, "The Beautiful and the Ugly Twin(sisters)". Its original name is also the title of the tale type in Norway, according to scholar Ørnulf Hodne's The Types of the Norwegian Folktale.

=== Variants ===
The tale type is reported to exist locally in Scandinavian countries, in Norway (6 variants), Iceland, Denmark and Sweden. In addition, the type has been reported in Ireland, and America.

Folklorist Hasan M. El-Shamy stated that the tale type was confined to the European continent, but variants were reported to exist in Turkey.

== Song ==
The American folk singer Hana Zara was inspired by "the story of a scrappy, headstrong girl" to compose a song called Tatterhood, because her parents often read the story to her when she was a young girl. Zara's first recording of the song was the title track of her 2013 album called Tatterhood; she re-recorded the song for her 2024 album Bloom Where You Fall.

== See also ==
- Kate Crackernuts
- King Lindworm
- The Cat on the Dovrefell

== Bibliography ==
- Halpert, Herbert; Widdowson, J. D. A. Folktales of Newfoundland (RLE Folklore): The Resilience of the Oral Tradition. Routledge Library Editions: Folklore, volume 7. Abingdon, Oxon: Routledge. 2015. pp. 222-225. ISBN 978-1-13884-2816
- Tye, Diane; Greenhill, Pauline (2020). "Foodways as Transformation in 'Peg Bearskin': The Magical and the Realistic in an Oral Tale". Narrative Culture. 7 (1): 98–118. doi:10.13110/narrcult.7.1.0098. S2CID 216284829. Project MUSE 753015 ProQuest 2475814063.
