= Old Witch Boneyleg =

1978 fairy tale anthology

- First edition
- Author: Ruth Manning-Sanders
- Illustrator: Kilmeny Niland
- Language: English
- Genre: Fairy Tales
- Publisher: Angus & Robertson
- Publication date: 1978
- Publication place: Australia
- Media type: Print (hardcover)
- Pages: 95 pp

Old Witch Boneyleg is a 1978 anthology of 13 fairy tales from around the world that have been collected and retold by Ruth Manning-Sanders. It is part of a long series of fairy tale anthologies by Manning-Sanders. This is a companion volume to The Haunted Castle. The book's title story is a Baba Yaga tale, although it does not mention the witch by name.

== Table of contents ==
1. Old Witch Boneyleg (Russia)
2. The Bunyip (Australia)
3. The Farmer and the Water Fairies (Iceland)
4. Iron Hans (Transylvania)
5. Two Minutes (Russia)
6. The Broken Pitcher (France)
7. Natasha Most Lovely (Russia)
8. The King's Beard (Greece)
9. The Gold Stag (German soldier story)
10. The Dancing Pigs (Germany)
11. Giant Babolna (Hungary)
12. The Cauld Lad of Hilton (England)
13. Tossen the Fool (Denmark)

== See also ==
- Witchcraft
- Bunyip
