= The Cat on the Dovrefjell =

Norwegian fairy tale

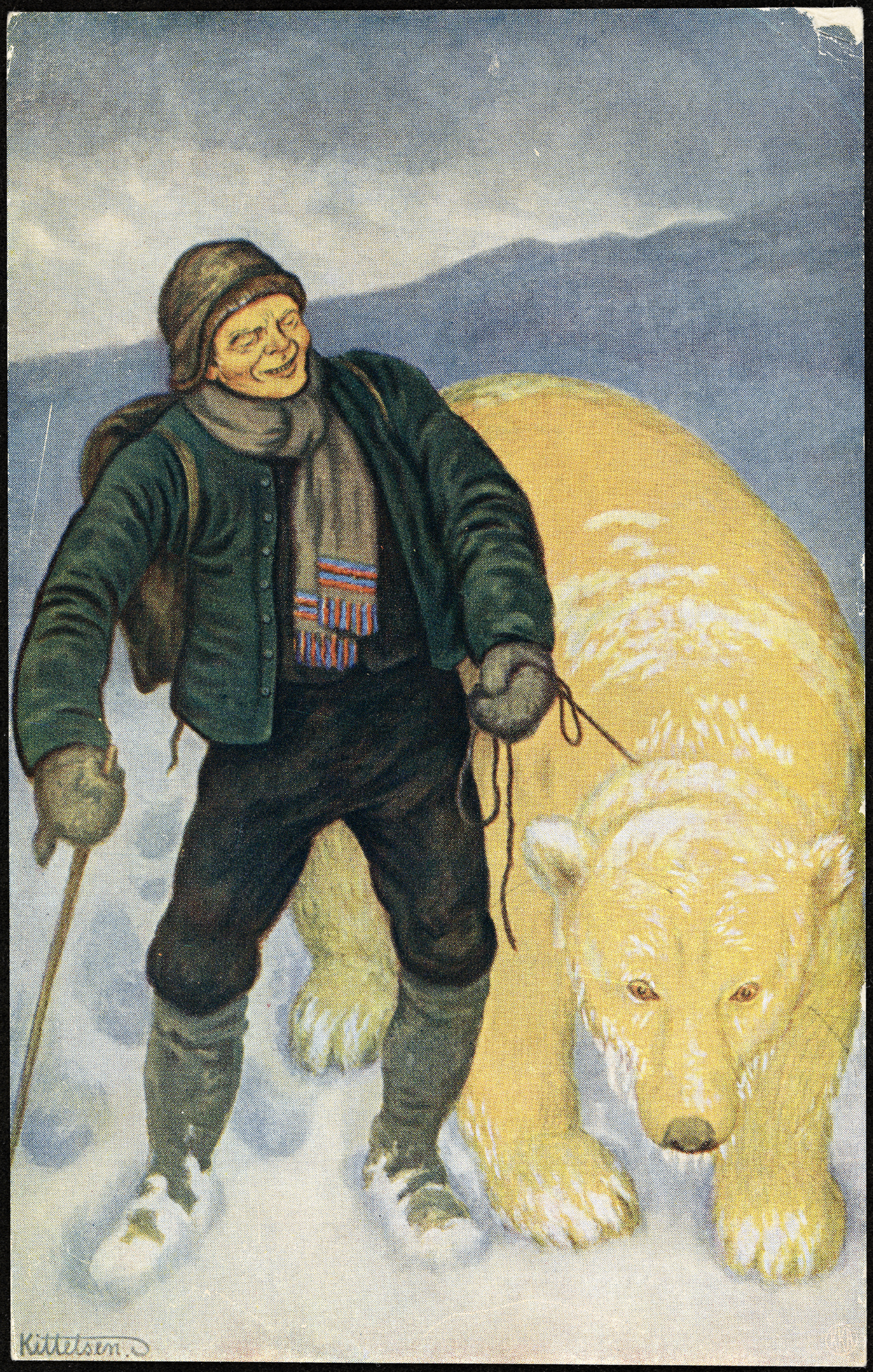

The Cat on the Dovrefjell (also known as The Cat on the Dovre-Mountain and The Trolls and the Pussycat) is a Norwegian fairy tale collected by Peter Christen Asbjørnsen and Jørgen Moe in Norske Folkeeventyr. It is Aarne–Thompson type 1161, The Bear Trainer and His Cat.

== Synopsis ==
A man was bringing a white bear to give to the king of Denmark, and he came to the mountain Dovre on Christmas Eve and asked a man called Halvor for shelter for the night. Halvor told him that trolls came to every Christmas Eve and made such havoc that the household had to flee them. The man said he would stay with his bear anyway.

The trolls came, eating the feast the people had left behind, and one began to bait the bear, calling it "Kitty". It rose and drove them all out of the house.

The next year, a troll asked Halvor if he still had that cat. Halvor assured him that he did, and she had had seven kittens, bigger and fiercer than herself. The trolls never again came to his cottage for Christmas Eve.

== Retellings ==
Jan Brett retold this story as Who's That Knocking on Christmas Eve, featuring a boy as the bear's owner and a girl as the one who welcomed him.

Kaja Foglio retold the story in comic form, where the bear's owner was a girl and the house owner was the girl's uncle.

== See also ==
- Tatterhood
