= The Three Witch Maidens =

1972 book by Ruth Manning-Sanders

- First edition
- Author: Ruth Manning-Sanders
- Language: English
- Genre: Fairy tales
- Publisher: Methuen & Co. Ltd.
- Publication date: 1972
- Publication place: United Kingdom
- Media type: Print
- Pages: 162 pp
- ISBN: 0-416-66550-0
- OCLC: 59232103

The Three Witch Maidens was originally published in the United Kingdom in 1972, by Methuen & Co. Ltd. The 1977 paperback version was published by The Hamlyn Publishing Group Ltd. under its Beaver Books imprint.

The book is an anthology of 15 fairy tales from around the world that have been collected and retold by Ruth Manning-Sanders. It is one in a long series of such anthologies by Manning-Sanders.

The back cover states: "Magical characters and strange devices — a Swedish genie, a young African girl for whom the sun means disaster, an apple which rolls across a silver dish to reveal the whole world — wait to be discovered in this collection of folk and fairy tales from many lands. For readers of all ages."

== Table of contents ==
- 1. The Three Witch Maidens (Transylvania)
- 2. The Good Oum-Aly (Valley of the Nile)
- 3. The Cow (Pomerania)
- 4. Lassy my Boy! (Sweden)
- 5. Walker by Moonlight (Africa)
- 6. The Giants in the Valley (Bohemia)
- 7. A Game of Cards with the King of Demons (India)
- 8. The Tailor, the Devil, and the Frogs (Czechoslovakia)
- 9. The Nine Ravens (Hungarian Gypsy)
- 10. The Silver Dish (Russia)
- 11. Tawhaki (New Zealand)
- 12. The Sneezing Ring (Greece)
- 13. The King of the Vultures (South America)
- 14. The Eighteen Soldiers (Hartz Mountains)
- 15. The Goat in Bed (Sicily)
