= Young Gabby Goose =

Book by Ruth Manning-Sanders

- First edition
- Author: Ruth Manning-Sanders
- Illustrator: James Hodgson
- Language: English
- Genre: Fairy tales
- Publisher: Methuen & Co. Ltd.
- Publication date: 1975
- Publication place: United Kingdom
- Media type: Print
- Pages: 86 pp
- ISBN: 9780416805208

Young Gabby Goose is a 1975 anthology of 14 animal-centered fairy tales from around the world, collected and retold by Ruth Manning-Sanders. These tales are written for a younger level of reader than Manning-Sanders' more familiar A Book of... series of fairy tales. This book was republished in a paperback edition in 1976.

== Contents ==
1. Young Gabby Goose and Mr Fickle Fox (Transylvania)
2. Hello, House! (Zanzibar)
3. Clever Sparrow (Transylvania)
4. Koko and the Waterfall (North Africa)
5. Dove, Fox and Raven (Finland)
6. Baby Brother and the Geese (Russia)
7. Pussy Bauldron and Dog Towser (Finland)
8. The Glove (Ukraine)
9. The Kitten and the Knitting-Needles (Germany)
10. Snail Walking (France)
11. Snail and Wolf (Italy)
12. The Turnip (Bohemia)
13. Old Man and the Rock (Red Indian)
14. The Letter in the Egg (Swabia)
