= Goose Wife =

Female character in the folklore of Inuit and other Arctic peoples

The Goose Wife is a mythical female character that appears in tales from the Inuit and other ethnic groups that dwell across the circumpolar Arctic region. The usual story is that the geese alight on land, become women by taking off their goose-skins and bathe in a lake. However, they are unaware that a human hunter is spying on them, and he steals the goose-skin of one of them, forcing her to be his wife. Due to the great similarities between both characters, the goose wife has been compared to the swan maiden, another female that alternates between human and bird forms.

== Overview ==
Scholars have noted the great similarities between the character of the goose wife of the folklore of Arctic peoples and the swan maiden, (Note: Ethnologue John Bierhorst also compared the "Goose Wife" to the "Swan Maiden" and stated that the story was "deeply entrenched in Inuit tradition".) which appears across Eurasia in several mythologies. The main plot points between both stories are that a flock of bird women (swans or geese) come to bathe in an earthly lake in human form; a man spies on them and steals the feather garments to force one of them to marry him; later, the bird woman regains her feathers (or birdskin) and flies back to the land of the birds.

As cited by Lotte Motz, researcher Inge Kleivan compared several Eskimo narratives of the bird/goose wife and produced a hypothetical proto-form. In these tales, the goose wife leaves her human husband and travels to the "Land of Birds". Whenever the husband finds her, she is already married to another bird person.

=== The bird wife ===
Researcher Birgitte Sonne stated that the bird wife is a wild goose or merganser in Greenland, while Inge Kleivan, in an article on Enzyklopädie des Märchens, stated that the bird maiden in Inuit stories was "almost always" a goose or a duck.

=== The giant helper ===
According to scholar Daniel Merkur and Inge Kleivan, in the story of the man searching for his bird wife, the human hunter meets the Fishmaker (or Salmon Maker) on his journey to the land of the birds, a giant that chops away wood and every woodchip becomes salmon (or other species of fish) when falling in the lake. This giant must be approached from the correct angle, for only then he will provide the human husband the means to cross to the land of the birds. Although he may exist in other, independent tales, the character appears in bird wife stories "across the Arctic, from southern Alaska to west Greenland": among the Chukchi, Koniag, Polar, and Netsilik peoples and in Baffin Island and west and east Greenland.

== Distribution ==
William L. Sheppard traced the geographical distribution of the tale of the Man who Married Sea Fowl according to the available literature. Versions are found in the following regions and groups: Greenland, Labrador, Baffin, Iglulik, Netsilik, Copper, North Alaska, Northwest Alaska, Bering Strait, Mainland Southwest Alaska, Koniag, Siberian Yupik, and Chukchi.

== Tales ==
=== North America ===
A. L. Kroeber collected a tale titled The Man who married a Goose, from Smith Sound. In this tale, the human hunter finds a goose woman and steals her garment. He marries her and she bears two children. Years into their marriage, the goose woman gathers feathers for herself and her children, they become geese and fly away. The human hunter meets a man named Qayungayung, carving boats and creating sea animals with every wood splinter. Qayungayung agrees to take the man to his wife across the water.

The goose wife also appears in tales of the Inuk hero Kiviuq. In these tales, Kiviuq (also Keeveeok, and variations) marries a woman whose goose skin he has stolen or hidden. She bears him children, but decides to fashion a pair of wings for her to return to the skies. In a version collected by Kira Van Deusen, Kiviuq finds three maidens bathing, all three having cast their water bird skins: "a sandhill crane, a loon, and a Canada goose". In another version, Kiviuq marries a goose maiden as a second wife; she cannot bear to eat human food and flies away, with Kiviuq going after her. During his journey, he finds obstacles he has to overcome: two grizzlies mauling each other, a lit qulliq (lamp/stove), a pot boiling a stew made of human parts, and two mountains that clash against each other.

Scientist Fridtjof Nansen reported an "Eskimo" tale wherein a reindeer-hunter finds some maidens bathing in a lake, and steals the clothes of one of them (the most beautiful one), while the other maidens escape in the form of geese and mergansers. The hunter marries the maiden and she bears him a son. However, she secretly gathers feathers to fashion new birdskins for her and her son, and they fly away. The hunter goes after them and meets a man cutting chips of wood that transform into fishes. The hunter rides a big salmon to where his family is hiding.

Author Ramona Maher published a tale titled The Man who Married a Snow Goose. In this tale, on Kodiak Island a chief keeps his son at home to protect him from his prophesied death in the ocean. Time passes, and the boy grows restless with longing for the outside. When he is 17 years old, he distracts his father's guards and steps outside, delighting at the view of people, the sky, the sounds. When he sights the guards returning, a "lump of tears" fills him with an intense sadness. His father lets the young man live and hunt with other people of the village. One day, the young man sees five geese flying overhead. He follows them and, as he approaches, he hears women's voices and laughter. He finds five maidens playing and bathing in the water, some gooseskins carefully folded in some bushes. He hides the garments of the youngest; the five maidens leave the water, four of them turn back into geese. The young hunter takes the remaining goose maiden (now human) and takes her to the human village. Despite being in a human state, the goose wife still retains avian eating habits (for instance, she eats beach grass and grass under the trees; seeds from pods and berries). A baby boy is born to her. Her sister-in-law mocks her laughter, and, tired of the abuse, the snow goose wife finds the goosekin, wears it and flies away with the baby on her back. The hunter learns of her departure and goes after her. Near the end of the journey, he meets an old man carving a piece of wood. The old man introduces himself as Qayungayung. The human hunter travels across the sea on a king salmon and finds his wife and son in the "land where the birds stay during winter". He tries to adjust to life with the bird people, but eventually intrudes in their ritual transformation between human and bird forms. At the end of the tale, the birds say they need to move out to another region, and the human hunter is carried by an eagle, but the bird bites his arm and he falls to his death in the water. The hunter and goose maiden's son becomes a puffin.

==== Canada ====
Franz Boas collected a tale from the "Central Eskimo" (Cumberland Sound), with the title Ititaujang (or Itajung), after its main character. Ititaujang goes to the "land of the birds" and finds himself a wife there, by hiding the maiden's boots. She reluctantly marries the human hunter and goes to live in his hut. She gives birth to a son and gathers enough feathers for herself and the boy to fly back to her original home in "the land of the birds". As the tale continues, on the way to his wife, hunter Ititaujang meets a man named Ixalu'qdjung chopping a piece of red wood with his hatchet. According to Boas's research, to the Aivilik, the tale of Ititaujang also belongs to the Kiviuq Cycle, as the episode of Kiviuq meeting the "Salmon Man" during the quest for his wife.

Ethnologist Vilhjalmur Stefansson collected two tales of goose wives from two Copper Inuit tellers. In both tales, the hunter has stolen the garments of a grey goose maiden. He marries her and she begets him a certain number of children (one in the first version, three in the second). She prepares makeshift wings for her and her children and they leave behind the human father (on the second tale, only a child remains with the father).

In a version from Baffin Land, the human hunter, named Itiqtaujaq, steals the boots of a goose maiden and marries her. She does not adapt to ordinary human life and collects feathers to make a new pair of wings for herself and her son. Both depart with the wings and Itiqtaujaq follows after them. The hunter meets a person named Eqaluqdjuq, who is carving a piece of wood and every wood chip falls into the water to become salmon.

Knud Rasmussen collected a tale from the Iglulik Inuit with the title The man who travelled to the land of birds: a man goes after his wild goose wife in the land where gulls and ravens lived. The story flashes back to the moment where he met his wife: he found a group of women playing and frolicking without clothes on, and withheld their garments; intent on finding a strong woman as wife, he tested their strength by having them pull a line made of the hide of a bearded seal. He chose the strongest woman, married her and had children. However, when autumn came and the wild geese flew away, so did his wife. Back to the present, the man finds shelter in a double house that belongs to a raven and a gull. Later, he looks for the land of wild geese, and, in his lonely moments, sings a song about his adventures. At last, he finds the land of birds. Outside his wife's double house, their son sees him and goes inside to tell his mother.

Authors Edward W. Dolch and Marguerite P. Dolch published a tale they sourced from Canada. In this tale, The Fairy Maidens and its sequel, The Hunter and the Fairy Maiden, a hunter tries to shoot some deer, but they beg for their lives. The hunter complies and the deer, in gratitude, directs him to a lake. He goes to the lake and waits a little; suddenly, seven white birds come, take off their feather garments and become human maidens to bathe in the lake. The hunter steals one of their garments. As night falls, the maidens try to look for their sister's garments, but, since it is late, they fly away and leave their sister by the lake. The hunter comes out of the bushes and promises to give the maiden the garments, if she becomes his wife. In the second part, the hunter has married the bird maiden, and lives with their two sons. The maiden knows her husband hid her garments in a box, and wears it from time to time. Eventually, the village suffers from a period of hunger, and the bird maiden, daughter of a sky god, tells her husband her father will bring them food. Some time later, a flock of snow geese bring them food. Despite the help, one of the villagers complains that the food is for birds. Feeling insulted, the maiden wears her garments, takes her sons and flies back to her father. The hunter notices his wife's absence and consults with his chief, who advises him to go to the end of the Big Water. Once there, the hunter meets a giant that helps him cross the water to the land of birds in the sky. At the end of the tale, the sky god turns the hunter into a sea-gull, so that he can live with his family.

Author Lawrence Millman published an Inuit tale titled Asalok's Family, gathered from sources in Greenland and Labrador. In this tale, a man named Asalok lives by himself, his only companions skulls of seals with which he amuses himself. One day, he sights some women bathing in a lake and steals the clothing of one of them. As soon as the women see him, they turn into seagulls and fly away, save for one whose clothes the man stole. The seagull woman pleads Asalok for her clothes, and the man agrees to return them if the woman marries him. A deal is made, and Asalok marries the seagull woman, but he clothes her with some discarded skins. Three sons are born to them; Asalok teaches the boys human skills, like hunting, but their mother makes them fetch feathers for themselves, so they can weave wings. Some time later, Asalok find that his wife and sons have flown away, and goes after them in his kayak. On his journey, he meets an old eagle-woman who directs him to his wife's location: an ice-hut on a cliff. As he approaches the cliff, he sees in the distance his wife, his children and some people chatting. Asalok barges into the ice-hut, but it disappears, and everyone turns back into birds. His wife, in bird form, glares at him then flies away again, and Asalok returns to his lonely life.

Russian researcher N. B. Bakhtin translated into Russian collected from a Canadian Inuit source. In this tale, titled "Серая гусыня" ("Gray Goose"), a man approaches a gray goose that was swimming in human form and steals her clothes, forcing her to marry him. She bears him a son, and is not happy about living like a human, since she prefers to eat grass instead of meat. When her son is old enough, she teaches him how to flap his wings and they fly away together. The tale was originally collected by Diamond Jenness from a teller named Ikpakhuaq, from Dolphin and Union Strait.

Ethnographer Bernard Saladin d'Anglure collected a Goose Wife tale from an Igloolik informant named Kupaaq (Kupao, in the French publication), who learned it from his mother. In this tale, originally translated to French as L'homme qui avait épousé une oie ("The man that married a goose") and later to English as The Goose Woman, an Inuk man wanders around until he reaches a lake where some birds women are bathing: Canadian geese and eider ducks, with mitiik (eider duck) and nirliik (Canadian geese) garments nearby. He steals their garments and the bird women beg him to return them. The Inuk man does as asked, and the bird women fly away, but he withholds the garments of a goose maiden he wants to make his wife. The man returns the goose disguise to the goose maiden in return for her becoming his wife. They marry, and she bears him a human son. However, the goose wife avoids working with seal blubber and from other marine animals. One day, the Inuk man hunts some arviq (bowhead whale) meat and asks his wife to come help him, since the other men's wives are doing the same. The goose wife refuses, and the man throws the meat at her, which causes her to cry. The goose wife gathers goose feathers for herself and her son, turns both of them into birds, and they fly away. The Inuk man sights their flying off, and goes after them, singing a song about journeying into the Land of the Birds, ukiujuittuq ('(land) where there is no winter'). On his journey, he passes by a big oil lamp, a big pot, two black bears locked in combat with each other, two female thighs, and two stone blocks grinding against each other. Finally, he meets a giant naked man named Iqallijuq, with an open anus through which the Inuk man can see his glottis. The Inuk man approaches the naked man, who is creating iqaluit (fishes) by chopping wood with an axe, smearing each chip with his sperm and throwing them in the water. Iqallijuq carves a canoe out of another wood and the Inuk uses it to cross the river to the other bank. On the other side, he reaches a village: its dwellers soon enter their tents, save for his own son, who recognizes his father and takes him to this mother's tent. The Inuk man reunites with his wife, who is pregnant and married to an elder goose man. The goose man orders his goose wife to give him an old bag filled with feathers, the goose family puts it on and flies away as birds. The Inuk man aims at the escaping trio and shoots at his goose wife, killing her.

==== Alaska ====
Author Margaret Lantis published a version of the bird-wife from Kodiak Island and compared it to tales from Baffin Land and from Greenland.

F. A. Golder collected a tale from Kodiak Island (more specifically, from Unga Island), with the title The Grouse-Girl. In this tale, two male hunters live in a hut together, one older and lame, and the other young. One day, a grouse lands near the young hunter, but he shoos it away three times. Then the bird sits near the older one, who gives him food. As they continue hunting game for themselves, they return home and see the place clean and tidy. Suspecting someone is entering their house, the old hunter hides while the other is hunting, and sees the grouse taking off its skin and becoming a woman.

In a tale collected by Elizabeth Burrows in Old Hamilton, Lower Yukon, with the title The Goose Girl, a man has three sisters, the youngest with an eye in the middle of her head. When he goes deer-hunting, the keeps a goose in a hunting pen. After he returns from the hunt, he discovers that his food is always prepared and his clothes hung out to dry. He spies on his mysterious housekeeper: a girl that takes off its goose-skin. The man surprises her, but she warns him she is an animal, not human. Either way, he marries her and she bears him a son. He takes his wife with him to live with his sisters, but his youngest sibling complains that the goose wife does not sew his clothes in a proper way and complains about her eating habits. Feeling insulted, she wears back the goose skin, turns into a bird and takes her son with her to the south. Her human husband goes after her and finds her living with a new mate, a crane. His son sees his father coming and goes inside to tell his mother about it.

Canadian anthropologist Diamond Jenness collected a tale titled The Duck Wife, from an informant named Fred, an Eskimo from Nome, Alaska. In this tale, in Tapqaq (Cape Prince of Wales) a man and his wife insist that their son finds a wife. He leaves home in search of one. He travels on his kayak to another region. He sees a group of maidens bathing and captures one as his wife. He offers her some game, but she refuses. He brings her to his parents. She bears him a son and a daughter, and refuses to eat meat, preferring to eat herbs to sate her hunger. Her mother-in-law notices the strange habit of hers and mockingly suggests she might be a duck. The wife feels insulted and storms off their house with her two children. Her husband comes home and questions his mother about his wife's absence. He deduces she has gone off and goes after her. On his way, he meets two men and gain an ax and a pair of pants made of sealskin. When he reaches the margin of a lake, he sleeps for a while. When he wakes up, a fox is at his side. The fox takes off its coat, becomes a man and asks him about his destination. The fox-man directs him to a mountain where "the dead" roam about, and beyond that a village, where the largest house with herds of deer belongs to his wife. He crosses the mountain and reaches the village, where his son - now an adult - sees him and goes home to warn his mother. The hunter enters the house and the wife doubts that he is her husband. After some explaining, the hunter sits down to eat with his family: small berries and little fishes, no seal or deer meat - a diet for ducks. At the end of the tale, after a third child is born to them, the hunter departs with his child and wife back to his land, and leaves his elder son and daughter there. The tale was also translated into Russian as "Женщина-утка" ("The Duck Wife").

==== Greenland ====
Danish scholar Hinrich Johannes Rink collected an "Eskimo" tale from Greenland, which he titled The Man who mated himself with a Sea-Fowl. The bird maiden is described as a "bird" or "sea-fowl" at the beginning of the tale, and as a gull at the end.

Knud Rasmussen collected a tale titled The Man who took a Wife from among the Wild Geese, from a Greenlander informant named Tateraq. In this tale, a man sees a flock of wild geese coming to bathe in a lake, take off their skins and become men and women. The human hunter steals the birdcoats of two of their women. One of them begs for her birdskin to be returned, which he does, and keeps another women as his wife. They marry and she bears him two twin boys. As time passes, the goose wife, now stranded in a human life, begins to miss her flock and gathers enough loose feathers for a new garment for herself. One day, while her human husband is away, the goose wife wears the makeshift birdcoat and flies away with her two children. The human husband realizes his wife is missing and goes after her. He passes by two earth spirits, a boiling pot with seal's flesh inside, and some hairless dogs, until he meets a creature named Kajungajorssuaq. Kajungajorssuaq points him the way to his wife. The man jumps on the ice-floe and goes to his wife and children. His wife, however, was married to another man, a long-tailed duck.

In a Greenlandic tale, "Жена-гусыня" ("The Goose Woman"), a woman lives with her grandson. One day, on his wanderings, he sights a group of women (geese) bathing, some clothes tossed aside. He takes them all. The women leave the lake and ask for their clothes back: he returns to everyone but two, a small girl and an older girl. Choosing the older girl as his wife, he returns the clothes to the younger. He marries the goose woman and she gives birth to two eggs, that hatch two boys. The old woman ponders about the strange behaviour of her great-grandchildren: they peck at the leather walls of the hut to look for pebbles, and gather feathers found on the beach. One day, the goose wife leaves home with her sons and does not return. The human husband asks his grandmother her whereabouts. He goes after her on a long journey. One time, he finds a giant man cutting a tree with an axe; the splinters falling into the water and becoming trouts. The strange man, named Kayunayugsyuak, tells the hunter he saw three birds cross the water. The man helps him cross the water to the other side, and finds the land of geese, where his wife and sons live. The tale was originally collected by linguist Erik Holtved with the title The Goose-Wife and sourced from a Polar Eskimo informant (modern day name: Inughuit) named Amaunalik.

==== Pacific Northwest ====
Anthropologist John R. Swanton collected several tales of the Goose Wife from the Haida and the Tlingit, and summarized their common points: the hunter captures two geese maidens, eventually marrying one or both; the goose maidens, now human, are given food when the "goose tribe" flies over them; they return to the skies and the human husband goes after them.

In a Tlingit tale collected by Swanton from Sitka, Alaska, The Brant Wives, a KîksA'di finds two women bathing in a pond, and steals their bird garments to force them to marry him. Both women, who are two brants, agree to marry him. They live together. When spring comes, the brant wives see a flock of brants flying and ask them for food. When the flock returns and flies south, both wives go with them. Their human husband follows them. A second tale, The Brant Wife, was collected from Wrangell, Alaska.

===== Haida people =====
Swanton also published a Haida tale, collected from a teller named Walter McGregor of the "Sealion-town people", with the title He who hunted birds in his father's village. In this tale, a chief's son hunts about and finds two women bathing in a lake. He takes their geese garments and withholds them until the youngest maiden agrees to marry him. He returns the goose skin of the oldest and she flies back to the skies. The chief's son marries the youngest goose maiden and hides her featherskin in a tree just before the village entrance. Some time later, the goose wife begins to yearn for her former life, takes the skin back and flies away from her human husband. When he wakes up, he questions everyone in the village of her whereabouts, and decides to go after her.

Author Robert Bringhurst republished a tale from a Haida narrator named Ghandl of the Qayahl Llaanas. In this tale, a hunter wearing two marten skins goes hunting. He hears some geese sounds and goes to the edge of a lake, where he finds two women bathing, their goose skins near the shore. He steals both gooseskins, and says he wishes to marry the younger of the two. The elder sister tries to offer herself as the hunter's wife, but he insists he wants the youngest. A deal is made, and the elder sister gains her gooseskin back, turns into a goose and flies away, leaving her younger sister to her fate of marrying a human hunter. The man, the headman's son, goes back to the village and hides her skin in the trunks. Her father-in-law invites the people to see his son's new wife and offer her food, but she cannot human food. One day, he spies on her going to the shore to eat some eelgrass, then returns home. Later, a famine strikes the village, and the goose girl's family brings food for the humans, albeit silverwood and clover roots. The people mock her for wanting goose food, which upsets her so much she takes back her gooseskin and flies back to her home, leaving her human husband mourning for her. After a period of sadness, he consults with an old man how he can find his wife. The old man gives the headman's son a bone marlinspike, then bids him fetch oil, two sharp wedges, a comb, a cord, salmon roe, a coho skin and a spearhead, and points him to the direction of the trail. The headman's son walks the path until he find someone trying to catch lice, to which he gives the comb and the oil. Next, he helps a little female mouse with cranberries on its mouth reach its home, and in return the mouse gives him a mouseskin stored inside a little box. Third, he meets a woman "hold[ing] up the mountains of the Islands on the Boundary between Worlds", to which he gives the cord. He then reaches a pillar going all the way to the sky, wears the mouseskin and climbs it. In the sky land, he meets a half-person, then two men collecting firewood, to whom he gives the wedges, and finally reaches his wife's home village. His goose wife welcomes him, and he spends some time there, until he begins to dislike the place and intends to return home. Some birds offer to bring him back, but a raven agrees to do it and carries him to the edge of the clouds, then the man falls back to earth and becomes a gull. Bringhurst connected Ghandl's tale to the cycle of the "Swan Maiden".

=== Asia ===
==== Northeast Asia ====
===== Chuckchi people =====
Professor Waldemar Bogoras collected and published a tale from Northeastern Asia, collected among the Chukchi people. In this tale, the bird-wife is a goose. The hunter hides her goose-skin and marries her. The goose wife, however, is secretly visited by a flock of geese that throws her a new bunch of feathers to replace her lost feather skin. When the human hunter finds his wife, she is already married to another husband (a glaucus gull in one tale, an eagle-shaman in another). Bogoras also noted its resemblance to the Eskimo tale of "Ititaujang".

Charles Fillingham Coxwell translated a Chukchi tale collected by Bogoras from a Reindeer Chuckchi source near the Oloi river. In this tale, titled The Story of a Bird Woman, a young man finds the goose maidens and gull maidens bathing, their clothes on the shores. The youth steals their garments, which he returns to every one, save for a gull maiden whom he marries. She bears him two humans sons, and collects herbs for her mother-in-law. Later, a flock of geese gives her and her children their feathers and they fly away. The human husband learns they flew away, and asks his mother to prepare ten boots with provisions. The human husband finds an eagle which directs him to an old man chopping wood, whose anus is visible so he should approach the being from the front. The old man carves the human husband a magic boat he uses to reach bird's country on the other side of the sea. As soon as he reaches the shore, his two sons spot him and go to inform their mother. The man learns from his gull brother-in-law his wife is married to a Burgomaster Gull, the strongest in the village, so he fights the Big Gull by himself and tosses him out. Big Gull brings reinforcemants and several birds circle the house. The man gets a club and defeats the birds, and in the next day, he sprinkles water on them to freeze his enemies, then takes his gull wife and sons back with him. He returns the canoe to the monstrous man, and the eagle lends him his eagle coat so the family can fly home. At last, they reach home; the human husband sacrifices a reindeer and anoints both himself and his wife. The gull maiden then becomes human permanently. In his notes to this tale, Coxwell commented that the bird-woman appears in tales from the Yakut, Lapps and Samoyeds.

Bogoras published another Reindeer Chuckchi tale, collected from a source in Nizhnekolymsk, which he treated as another version of "Story of a Bird Woman". In this tale, some geese swim in the lake, when a man reaches the shore of the lake and finds women in the water and some women's clothes on the ground. He steals their clothes, which the woman beg him to return. He returns the clothes to the goose girls, who turn back into birds and fly away, and withholds the garments of the last goose girl, whom he takes for wife. He takes her with him to the house where he lives with his mother and a brother. The husband's mother asks the goose girl to find her some ina'tilhin (Nedisarum obscurum) for her bellyache, but she gets some grass. Her mother-in-law chides the goose girl. When the birds are flocking southward, the goose girl asks the flock to take her with them, so the birds throw her a set of feathers which she uses to fly away to their native land. Her husband returns home and discovers his wife left, then decides to go after her. He meets a man by the seashore that is carving wood, climbs up his anus and exits through the mouth, and lies that he came from the left. The man caves him a canoe with a lid that takes him to the land of the birds across the sea. When the man reaches the other side, his two sons notice him and go to inform their goose mother. The man learns she is married to a strong warrior, a Burgomaster Gull, who may kill the newcomer. The next day, the man fights the gull and the other birds with a club.

In a Chukchi tale collected from a Chukchi source with the title "Десять уток" ("Ten Ducks"), ten ducks alight to bathe in a lake and are spied on by human hunter Ememkut ("Эмемкут", in the original). Ememkut steals the duck maidens' kukhlyankas ("кухля́нка", a fur coat worn by Arctic peoples). When the duck maidens leave the water, they each ask the human to return their garments, which he does to nine of the ducks, save for the last one, the most beautiful and the one he chooses as his wife. The last duck maiden asks for her kukhlyanka back, but he tosses her on the tree branches and takes the duck maiden home. They marry, and she bears him two children, a son and a daughter. One day, when Ememkut is away on a hunt, his mother asks the duck maiden to fetch them some wild berries. She brings them "shiksha" (ru)" (Empetrum), and not "moroshka" (Rubus chamaemorus), which earns her complaints by her mother-in-law. Offended, the duck maiden asks her son to go out and call out for her when a flock of ducks fly over them. The son calls out twice, but both flocks are not her family. On the third time, the son sights another flock, which is his mother's. The duck maiden and her daughter turn into birds and join the flock, but her son begins to cry. The duck mother descends and ties makeshift wings with feathers and twigs, and the trio fly away. Ememkut returns home and is told his family flew away, which casts him in great sadness. Some time later, he goes to the seashore and finds a decrepit old man with shaggy hair and shabby clothes. Ememkut asks the old man if he saw a duck flying with two ducklings, and he confirms it. The old man also gives him some arrows that can create ice. Ememkut shoots the arrows at the sea and creates ice platforms until he crosses the sea to the land where his family are. He reaches the other side of the sea and meets his children, who say their mother is now married to a drake (a male duck). Ememkut shouts for the drake to come and face him for the right to be the duck maiden's husband. The birds attack the human hunter, but he strikes a whip against them and kills many. The duck maiden begs him to spare the birds, and returns with the human hunter and their children.

== Adaptations ==
Modern writer Rosamund Marriott Watson, under the pen name Graham R. Tomson, wrote Ballad of the Bird-Bride, a poem from the point of view of an Inuk hunter who marries the grey gull maiden and laments her departure.

Folklorist Lafcadio Hearn adapted the Inuit legend of the bird wife (gull maiden) for his book Stray leaves from strange literature, with the title The Bird Wife.

Author Ruth Manning-Sanders adapted the tale as The Bird-Wife, sourced from "Siberia". In this tale, a man named Marek discovers a lake where gulls and wild geese come to bathe, take off their feathers, and become women. Marek hides all of their clothing, but returns the feather garments to each of them, save one, whom he makes his wife. Marek brings the bird maiden home, but the girl is despised by her mother-in-law. The man and the bird maiden have two children, a boy and a girl, and one day Marek's mother sends her to fetch willow buds in winter. The bird maiden takes her children to fulfill the task and sees her old gull flock flying above her. The flock descend about her, give her and her children their feathers; she turns back into a bird, and so her children, and the three join the gulls in the skies. Back to Marek, he is told by his mother his wife abandoned him, but he decides to go after her. With the help of an Old Eagle and a magic canoe, the man makes his way to Bird Land, where his wife is living with their two children.
