= Scottish Folk Tales =

Book by Ruth Manning-Sanders

- First edition
- Author: Ruth Manning-Sanders
- Illustrator: William Stobbs
- Cover artist: William Stobbs
- Language: English
- Genre: Fairy Tales
- Publisher: Methuen & Co.
- Publication date: 1976
- Publication place: Great Britain
- Media type: Print (hardcover)
- Pages: 128 pp
- ISBN: 0-416-82580-X
- OCLC: 2861309

Scottish Folk Tales is a 1976 anthology of 18 fairy tales from Scotland that have been collected and retold by Ruth Manning-Sanders. It is one in a long series of such anthologies by Manning-Sanders.

== Table of contents ==
- Foreword
- 1. My own self
- 2. The Laird of Co
- 3. The shadow
- 4. The wee bit mousikie
- 5. Green caps
- 6. The Well at the World's End
- 7. The seal-wife
- 8. The little wee man
- 9. The Black Bull of Norroway
- 10. Whirra whirra bump!
- 11. Mester Stoorworm
- 12. Flitting
- 13. The Loch Ness Kelpie
- 14. Short Hoggers
- 15. Seven Inches
- 16. In a sack
- 17. The seal-hunter and the mermen
- 18. The Strange Visitor

Note: Inconsistencies in the capitalization of various title words are correct, per the book's contents page.

== See also ==
- Brownie
- Fairy
- Kelpie
- Loch Ness
- Merman
- Sea serpent
- Selkie
