= A Book of Giants =

1963 fairy tale book by Ruth Manning-Sanders

- First US edition
- Author: Ruth Manning-Sanders
- Illustrator: Robin Jacques
- Language: English
- Genre: Fairy Tales
- Publisher: Methuen & Co. Ltd. (UK); E. P. Dutton (US)
- Publication date: 1962 (UK); 1963 (US)
- Publication place: United Kingdom
- Media type: Print (hardcover)
- Pages: 125 pp

A Book of Giants is a 1963 anthology of 13 fairy tales from Europe that have been collected and retold by Ruth Manning-Sanders. It is one in a long series of such anthologies by Manning-Sanders. It was the first anthology to receive the familiar "A Book of..." title that Manning-Sanders would become notable for. This book was first published in the United Kingdom in 1962, by Methuen & Co. Ltd. It has been used in schools as a study aid.

== Description ==
Some of the tales from this book are also included in A Choice of Magic (1971) by Manning-Sanders. And some of the tales from this book are included in Folk and Fairy Tales (1978) by Manning-Sanders.

And in the foreword, Manning-Sanders discusses the long-ago roots of tales about giants: "The stories in this book are very old, and they come from many countries. We don't know who first told the story of Jack and the Beanstalk; but it has always been a favourite, and it used to be hawked around England in those little stitched-together pamphlets, called chapbooks, which traveling pedlars sold to the countryfolk for a penny or two each."

The author adds: "You will notice that the giants, wherever they come from, have one thing in common: they are all very stupid, and the way to overcome them is to use your wits."

== Table of contents ==
- 1. Jack and the Beanstalk (England)
- 2. The Giant and the Dwarf (Georgia)
- 3. Fin M'Coul and Cucullin (Ireland)
- 4. Sneezy Snatcher and Sammy Small (Cornwall)
- 5. Hans, the Horn, and the Magic Sword (Jutland)
- 6. Jack the Giant-Killer (Cornwall)

i. Jack and the Giant Cormoran
ii. Jack and the Giant Tantarem
iii. Jack and the Welsh Giant
iv. Jack, the King of England's Son, and the Giant with Three Heads
v. Jack and the Giant Thunderdell
vi. Jack, the Giant Galligantua, and the Enchanter

- 7. King Johnny (Slavic)
- 8. Conall Yellowclaw (Ireland and Scotland)
- 9. The Giant in the Cave (Ireland and Scotland)
- 10. The Brave Little Tailor (Germany)
- 11. The Giant Who Had No Heart in His Body (Norse)
- 12. The Three Golden Hairs of the King of the Cave Giants (Germany)
- 13. Prince Loaf (Romania)

== Reception ==
Kirkus Reviews gave A Book of Giants a kirkus star and wrote "Miss Manning-Sanders narrates these old legends in a direct language..." and "In his fine-lined drawings, Robin Jacques has built up a good contrast between the large and the small and has captured the essence of giantdom with a light touch." The Observer found "A splendid jacket by Robin Jacques at once invites the eye. Of course, myths have almost always been unfair to giants: still, we could not separate them from nursery lore, especially when, as in several of these tales, they are merely kindly, stupid fellows, easily outwitted (but not slain) by some sharp little dwarf. Though some are from local sources, others are from as far afield as Russian Georgia or Jutland. But are they so different?"

== See also ==
- Giant
