= Folk and Fairy Tales =

Book by Ruth Manning-Sanders

- First edition
- Author: Ruth Manning-Sanders
- Illustrator: Robin Jacques
- Language: English
- Genre: Fairy Tales
- Publisher: Methuen & Co. Ltd.
- Publication date: 23 November 1978
- Publication place: United Kingdom
- Media type: Print (hardcover)
- Pages: 254 pp

Folk and Fairy Tales is a 1978 anthology of 25 fairy tales from around the world that have been collected and retold by Ruth Manning-Sanders. In fact, the book is mostly a collection of tales published in previous Manning-Sanders anthologies. Stories are pulled from A Book of Dragons, A Book of Mermaids, A Book of Witches, A Book of Dwarfs, A Book of Devils and Demons, A Book of Kings and Queens, A Book of Magic Animals, A Book of Giants, A Book of Ogres and Trolls, A Book of Wizards, A Book of Enchantments and Curses and A Book of Monsters.

There are also five previously unpublished stories. (Numbers 21 through 25 in the table of contents.)

It is preceded by the anthology A Choice of Magic (1971), another collection of (mostly) previously published Manning-Sanders tales.

== Table of contents ==
- Introduction
- 1. My Lord Bag of Rice (Japan)
- 2. Merman Rosmer (Scotland)
- 3. The Old Witch (England)
- 4. The Skipper and the Dwarfs (Jutland)
- 5. Something Wonderful (Finland)
- 6. Selim and the Snake Queen (Greek Isles)
- 7. Jon and His Brothers (French Canada)
- 8. The Monster with Seven Heads (Madagascar)
- 9. The Giant Who Had No Heart in His Body (Norway)
- 10. The Little Tailor and the Three Dogs (Germany)
- 11. The Silver Penny (Hungary)
- 12. Vasilissa Most Lovely (Russia)
- 13. Fin M'Coul and Cucullin (Ireland)
- 14. King Josef (Czechoslovakia)
- 15. Long, Broad and Sharpsight (Bohemia)
- 16. The Knights of the Fish (Spain)
- 17. The Girl in the Basket (Italy)
- 18. The Monster in the Mill (Macedonia)
- 19. The Lost Prince (Iceland)
- 20. Lilla Rosa (Sweden)
- 21. Smoke Bones (North American Indian)
- 22. The Magic Roots (South America)
- 23. The Sailor and the Devil (Holland)
- 24. Sausages (Transylvania)
- 25. The Caribou Wife (Alaska)
