= The Red King and the Witch: Gypsy Folk and Fairy Tales =

- First US edition
- Author: Ruth Manning-Sanders
- Illustrator: Victor Ambrus
- Language: English
- Genre: Fairy Tales
- Publisher: OUP (UK) Roy (US)
- Publication date: 1964 (UK) 1965 (US)
- Publication place: United Kingdom
- Media type: Print (hardcover)
- Pages: 175 pp.

The Red King and the Witch: Gypsy Folk and Fairy Tales is a 1964 anthology of 25 tales that have been collected and retold by Ruth Manning-Sanders. The book features illustrations by Hungarian-British artist Victor Ambrus.

This book was first published in the United Kingdom in 1964, by Oxford University Press.

== Table of contents ==
- Brian and the Fox
- The Deluded Dragon
- The Hen That Laid Diamond Eggs
- Bald Pate
- Jankyn and the Witch
- Sylvester
- The Red King and the Witch
- The Old Soldier and the Mischief
- The Riddle
- It All Comes To Light
- Jack and His Golden Snuff-Box
- The Brigands and the Miller's Daughter
- The Little Bull-Calf
- The Little Fox
- Tropsyn
- The Tinker and His Wife
- The Little Nobleman
- The Snake
- The Tale of a Foolish Brother and of a Wonderful Bush
- The Black Dog of the Wild Forest
- The Dragon and the Stepmother
- The Dog and the Maiden
- An Old King and His Three Sons of England
- The Three Princesses and the Unclean Spirit
- Happy Boz'll
