= Red Indian Folk and Fairy Tales =

- 1967 edition (same cover)
- Author: Ruth Manning-Sanders
- Illustrator: C. Walter Hodges
- Cover artist: C. Walter Hodges
- Language: English
- Genre: Fairy Tales
- Publisher: Roy
- Publication date: 1960
- Publication place: United States
- Media type: Print (hardcover)
- Pages: 222 pp

Red Indian Folk and Fairy Tales is a 1960 anthology of 19 folk and fairy tales from American Indian cultures collected and retold by Ruth Manning-Sanders. It is one in a long series of such anthologies by Manning-Sanders.

== Table of contents ==
- I. Micabo's Island
- II. Ugly Thing
- III. Star Maiden
- IV. Beaver and Porcupine
- V. Raven Boy and Little Hawk
- VI. Adventures of Rabbit

Rabbit Goes Hunting
Rabbit and the Devouring Hill
Rabbit and the Thunder Birds

- VII. Zini and the Witches
- VIII. Napi and Nip
- IX. Young Mouse
- X. The Fat Grandmother
- XI. Adventures of Coyote

Coyote and the Mice
Coyote and the Quails
Coyote and Mole
Coyote and Little Blue Fox

- XII. The Magic Pebble
- XIII. Beautiful Girl
- XIV. Snake Ogre
- XV. Good Man and Bad Man
- XVI. Proud Girl and Bold Eagle
- XVII. Raven and the Wicked One
- XVIII. Otter Heart and the Magic Kettle
- XIX. Sun Arrow

== See also ==
- Native American mythology
