= Gianni and the Ogre =

1970 anthology by Ruth Manning-Sanders

- First edition
- Author: Ruth Manning-Sanders
- Illustrator: William Stobbs
- Language: English
- Genre: Fairy Tales
- Publisher: Methuen & Co. Ltd. (UK); E. P. Dutton (US)
- Publication date: 1970 (UK); 1971 (US)
- Publication place: United States
- Media type: Print (hardcover)
- Pages: 192 pp

Gianni and the Ogre is a 1971 anthology of 18 fairy tales that have been collected and retold by Ruth Manning-Sanders. It is one in a long series of such anthologies by Manning-Sanders. This book was first published in the United Kingdom in 1970, by Methuen & Co. Ltd. The titular story involves the son of an impoverished mother who goes to work for an ogre in order to afford food for him and his mother.

According to the dust jacket, all of the tales originated in the Mediterranean and the author's tales create "a lively fantasy world of kings and princesses, witches and dwarfs, fairies and fools."

== Table of contents ==
- 1. Gianni and the Ogre
- 2. Kabadaluk
- 3. Mother Sunday
- 4. Bardiello
- 5. Celery
- 6. The Three Ravens
- 7. The Spider
- 8. The Doll
- 9. King Fox

The Lad and his Animals
The Witch and the Earthen Jar
The Battle

- 10. Oudelette
- 11. The Daughter of the Dwarf
- 12. The Bean Tree
- 13. Little Finger
- 14. A-tishoo!
- 15. Grillo
- 16. Trim Tram Turvey
- 17. The Fiddler Going Home
- 18. Peppino
