= A Choice of Magic =

1971 book by Ruth Manning-Sanders

- First edition
- Author: Ruth Manning-Sanders
- Illustrator: Robin Jacques
- Language: English
- Genre: Fairy Tales
- Publisher: E. P. Dutton
- Publication date: 1971
- Publication place: United States
- Media type: Print (hardcover)
- Pages: 319 pp
- ISBN: 0-525-27810-9
- OCLC: 257122
- Dewey Decimal: 398.21
- LC Class: PZ8.M333 Ch

A Choice of Magic is a 1971 anthology of 32 fairy tales from around the world that have been collected and retold by Ruth Manning-Sanders. In fact, the book is mostly a collection of tales published in previous Manning-Sanders anthologies. Stories are pulled from A Book of Princes and Princesses (1969), A Book of Giants (1962), A Book of Dwarfs (1963), A Book of Dragons (1964), A Book of Ghosts and Goblins (1968), A Book of Witches (1965), A Book of Mermaids (1967), and A Book of Wizards (1966). There are also four previously unpublished stories.

It is followed by the anthology Folk and Fairy Tales (1978), another collection of (mostly) previously published Manning-Sanders tales.

== Table of contents ==
- Foreword
- 1. The Wonderful Shirt (Russia)
- 2. The Frog (Ukraine)
- 3. Jack and the Beanstalk (England)
- 4. Knurremurre (Zeeland)
- 5. Bottle Hill (Ireland)
- 6. The Nine Doves (Greece)
- 7. The Goblins at the Bath House (Estonia)
- 8. Johnny and the Witch-Maidens (Bohemia)
- 9. Sven and Lilli (Denmark)
- 10. Aniello (Sicily)
- 11. Aladdin (Arabia)
- 12. Esben and the Witch (Denmark)
- 13. Sneezy Snatcher and Sammy Small (England)
- 14. Mons Tro (Denmark)
- 15. Rake Up! (Denmark)
- 16. King Johnny (Slavonia)
- 17. The Enchanted Prince (Hungary)
- 18. The Adventures of Billy MacDaniel (Ireland)
- 19. Little Hiram (India)
- 20. Prince Loaf (Rumania)
- 21. Hans and His Master (Hungary)
- 22. Golden Hair (Corsica)
- 23. Constantes and the Dragon (Greece)
- 24. Tatterhood (Norway)
- 25. The Princess's Slippers (Archangel)
- 26. Jack and the Wizard (Wales)
- 27. The Two Wizards (Africa)
- 28. The Three Mermaids (Italy)
- 29. The Girl Who Picked Strawberries (Germany)
- 30. The Magic Lake (Ireland)
- 31. Old Verlooka (Russia)
- 32. Stan Bolovan (Rumania)
