= Damian and the Dragon: Modern Greek Folk-Tales =

Book by Ruth Manning-Sanders

- First edition
- Author: Ruth Manning-Sanders
- Illustrator: William Papas
- Language: English
- Genre: Fairy tales
- Publisher: Oxford University Press
- Publication date: 1965
- Publication place: United Kingdom
- Media type: Print (hardcover)
- Pages: 190 pp
- ISBN: 9780416762204

Damian and the Dragon: Modern Greek Folk-Tales is a 1965 anthology of 21 tales that have been collected and retold by Ruth Manning-Sanders.

It is one in a long series of such anthologies by Manning-Sanders. This book was published in the United Kingdom in 1965, by Oxford University Press.

== Table of contents ==
- Damian and the Dragon
- My Lady Sea
- The Four Fishes
- Penteclemas and the Pea
- Big Matsiko
- The Prince and the Vizier's Son
- The Bay-Tree Maiden
- The Cats
- Yiankos
- The Cunning Old Man and the Three Rogues
- The Wild Man
- My Candlestick
- The Melodious Napkin
- Alas!
- The Lion, the Tiger and the Eagle
- The Golden Casket
- The Beardless One
- The Sleeping Prince
- The Three Precepts
- The Twins
- Luck
