= Tortoise Tales =

1974 book by Ruth Manning-Sanders

- Author: Ruth Manning-Sanders
- Illustrator: Donald Chaffin
- Cover artist: Donald Chaffin
- Language: English
- Genre: Fairy tales
- Publisher: Thomas Nelson
- Publication date: 1972 (UK), 1974 (USA)
- Publication place: United Kingdom
- Media type: Print (hardcover)
- Pages: 95 pp
- ISBN: 0840763891

Tortoise Tales is a 1974 anthology of 13 animal-centered fairy tales from around the world that have been collected and retold by Ruth Manning-Sanders. These tales are written for a younger level of a reader unlike Manning-Sanders' more familiar "A Book of..." series.

According to the dust jacket: "Animals are a basic part of the traditional stories of most countries. ... The author has selected short, simple stories, each so lively that it makes an immediate impact on the listener or reader. This collection has the right combination of humor, pathos, and suspense to captivate preschoolers as well as older children."

The tale "Gar-room!" features the trickster spider Anansi.

== Contents ==
- 1. Tortoise and the Children (South American Indian)
- 2. Tortoise and Elephant (East African)
- 3. Tortoise and Ogre (South American Indian)
- 4. Rabbit and Our Old Woman (Finnish)
- 5. Rabbit and the Wolves (North American Indian)
- 6. Gar-room! (Jamaican)
- 7. Little Sister Fox (Russian)
- 8. Hare Running (West Canadian Indian)
- 9. Hyena and Hare (Creole)
- 10. Little Cat and Little Hen (Russian)
- 11. Hare's Ears (Ethiopian)
- 12. Grasshopper and Fox (North American Indian)
- 13. Nanny Goat with Nuts (Russian)

== Reception ==
Kirkus Reviews wrote "Disappointingly only the first three tales are about Tortoise" and "You'll recognize most of the ploys but these are for slightly younger readers than are most of Manning-Sanders' collections and they are appropriately snappy and short."

It also appeared in library programs and school reading lists.
