= Peter and the Piskies =

Book by Ruth Manning-Sanders

Peter and the Piskies: Cornish Folk and Fairy Tales
- First edition (UK)
- Author: Ruth Manning-Sanders
- Illustrator: Raymond Briggs
- Language: English
- Genre: Fairy Tales
- Publisher: OUP (UK); Roy (US)
- Publication date: 1958 (UK); 1966 (US)
- Publication place: United Kingdom
- Media type: Print (hardcover)
- Pages: 215 pp

Peter and the Piskies: Cornish Folk and Fairy Tales is a 1958 anthology of 34 fairy tales from Cornwall that have been collected and retold by Ruth Manning-Sanders and illustrated by Raymond Briggs. It was the first in a long series of such anthologies by Manning-Sanders.

In an author's note, Manning-Sanders says of the passing down of the tales: "A widow woman lived in a cottage by the sea. ... It was the piskies who told the old widow woman the stories in this book, and she told them to me, and now I am telling them to you."

Of the tales themselves, the book's dust jacket says: "The folk-tales of Cornwall are peopled with giants and saints and wicked demons; with the thieving, spiteful spriggans, the mischievous piskies who are always laughing, and the little bearded knockers who work industriously in the mines, and who, they say, are growing smaller with every year they live so that there will come a day when they are no size at all."

This book was first published in the United Kingdom in 1958, by Oxford University Press. It was not published in the United States until eight years later, by Roy Publishers. The information for this entry is taken from the U.S. version.

== Table of contents ==
- 1. Peter and the Piskies
- 2. Skillywidden
- 3. Lutey and the Mermaid
- 4. Betty Stogs' Baby
- 5. The Cock-Crow Stone
- 6. Lyonesse
- 7. The Boy and the Bull
- 8. Saint Margery Daw
- 9. From the Head Downward
- 10. Tregeagle
- 11. The Piskie Thresher
- 12. Saint Neot
- 13. The Knockers of Ballowal
- 14. The Witch of Fraddam
- 15. The Giant of the Mount
- 16. The Spriggans' Treasure
- 17. Cherry
- 18. Bucca Dhu and Bucca Gwidden
- 19. Fairies on the Gump
- 20. Tom and Giant Blunderbus
- 21. The Crowza Stones
- 22. The Giant Holiburn
- 23. Parson Wood and the Devil (1. The Demon Wrestler, 2. The Feathered Fiend)
- 24. Madgy Figgey and the Sow
- 25. The Tinner, the Dog, the Jew, and the Cake
- 26. The Small People's Cow
- 27. The Wish-hound
- 28. The Demon Mason
- 29. The Mermaid in Church
- 30. Mr Noy
- 31. Barker's Knee
- 32. Peepan Pee
- 33. Duffy and the Devil
- 34. The Two Sillies

== See also ==
- Pixie (folklore)
- Knocker (folklore)
