= Fox Tales =

1976 book by Ruth Manning-Sanders

- First edition
- Author: Ruth Manning-Sanders
- Illustrator: James Hodgson
- Language: English
- Genre: Fairy Tales
- Publisher: Methuen & Co. Ltd.
- Publication date: 1976
- Publication place: United Kingdom
- Media type: Print (paperback)
- Pages: 95 pp
- ISBN: 0-416-56010-5

Fox Tales is a 1976 anthology of 16 animal-centered fairy tales from around the world that have been collected and retold by Ruth Manning-Sanders. These tales are written for a slightly younger level of reader than Manning-Sanders' more familiar "A Book of..." series of fairy tales.

== Contents ==
- 1. Terry Gong-Gong (Africa)
- 2. What did you do? (Africa)
- 3. The fish cart (Finland)
- 4. The well (Finland)
- 5. Fox the gooseherd (Estonia)
- 6. Fox and Crocodile (India)
- 7. Lucky or unlucky? (India)
- 8. Fox and Weasel (East Africa)
- 9. Fox and Hare (Nova Scotia)
- 10. The little cake (Caucasus)
- 11. In the wolf pit (Hungary)
- 12. Fox and Crow (Egypt)
- 13. Umbrella (Russia)
- 14. Buns and honey (Turkey)
- 15. Over the wall (Turkey)
- 16. The very little man (Germany)
