= Cauld Lad of Hylton =

English ghost story

The Cauld Lad of Hylton is a ghost of murdered stable boy Robert Skelton, said to haunt the ruins of Hylton Castle (in Sunderland, Northern England). The events are said to have taken place in the 16th or 17th century and there are several legends concerning the ghost's origins.

== Legend ==
One story states that the stable boy was caught courting Baron Hylton's daughter, and was killed.

Another version says that the baron ordered that his horse be prepared for an important journey, but Skelton had overslept. There are several versions of what happened next. The enraged baron was said to have either decapitated the boy, stabbed him with a nearby pitchfork, or hit him on the back of the head with a riding crop, striking a spot that had been injured (and weakened) the day before, causing a fatal blow.

The baron was then reported to have disposed of the body in a deep pond, or an unused well.

Several months later, the body was recovered. The baron was tried for Skelton's murder, but had an alibi. An old farm worker stated that the baron had ordered the boy to remove a tool from the top shelf in the barn, and the boy had fallen, seriously wounding himself in the process. The baron had tended to the wounds, but the boy had died. It is on record that Robert Hylton, 13th Baron Hylton was pardoned in 1609.

Soon afterwards, strange events began to occur in the castle. The kitchen would be tidied at night if left in a mess, or messed up if left tidy. An unseen person would take hot ashes from the fires, and lie on them, leaving an imprint of a body. Chamber pots were emptied on the floor.

After a while, a cook stayed up until midnight to see who was causing the mischief. He saw the ghost of a naked boy, and heard him crying "I'm cauld" ("I'm cold"). The cook and his wife left a warm cloak for the ghost, and the next night they heard, "Here's a cloak and here's a hood, the Cauld Lad of Hylton will do no more good." The ghost disappeared and the strange occurrences ceased, though even now people claim to have heard the ghostly cries of the Cauld Lad.

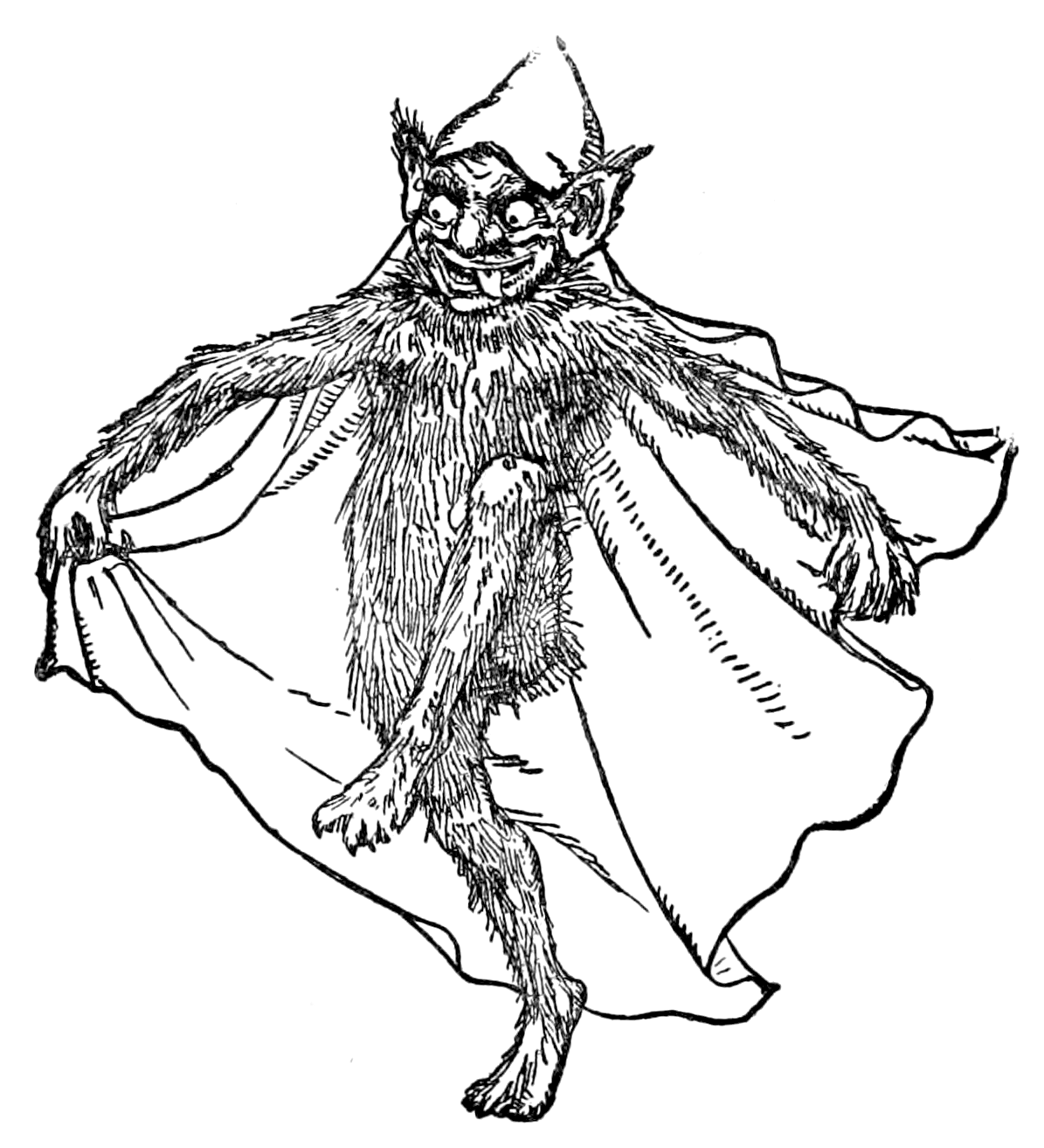
Illustration of a brownie from Jacob's English Fairy Tales

The behaviour of the ghost suggests a poltergeist. Other versions of the tale describe the Cauld Lad as an elf, barghest, or brownie who is under a spell from which he can only be released by being given a gift. His mischief is intended to draw attention to himself in the hope that he will be saved. He sings the following song, which indicates how long he expects to be enchanted:

Wae's me, wae's me, ("Woe is me, woe is me,")
The acorn's not yet fallen from the tree,
That's to grow the wood,
That's to make the cradle,
That's to rock the bairn ("That will rock the baby"),
That's to grow to the man
That's to lay me! ("That will exorcise me!")

This song is included in the tales where he is laid by the gift of clothing; as a prediction, the song is inaccurate.
