= William Stobbs =

British author and illustrator (1914–2000)

William Stobbs (27 June 1914 – 6 April 2000) was a British author and illustrator. From 1950 to 1958, he served as the head of the design department at the London School of Printing and Kindred Trades. He later moved to Kent, England where he became principal of Maidstone College of Art.

Stobbs won the 1959 Kate Greenaway Medal from the Library Association, recognising the year's best children's book illustration by a British subject. Two books were cited (a practice repeated only for 1975 and 1982), Kashtanka and A Bundle of Ballads, both published by Oxford University Press.

Kashtanka is an edition of the 1887 story by Anton Chekhov. The city dog Kashtanka is frightened by an army marching band and runs away, gets lost, gets taken in by a stranger.

A Bundle of Ballads is an edition of Child Ballads compiled by Ruth Manning-Sanders.

Stobbs also illustrated Gianni and the Ogre (Methuen, 1970), a collection of 18 Mediterranean fairy tales selected and retold by Manning-Sanders, one of her numerous anthologies, as well as the young adult historical fiction Rebellion in the West (Oliver and Boyd, 1962) by Mary Drewery.

Most of his works most widely held in WorldCat participating libraries were written by Ronald Syme (not to be confused with Ronald Syme the historian): juvenile biographies of Magellan, De Soto, Balboa, da Gama, Hudson, Cartier, Vespucci, Raleigh, Pizarro, John Smith of Virginia, Captain John Paul Jones, Columbus, Captain Cook, Verrazano, Cabot, Bolivar, Cortes, La Salle, Champlain, Marquette and Joliet, and Drake. Nevertheless, WorldCat identifies Stobbs with the genres folktale and fairy tale, which recognises his editions of tales from Perrault or the Brothers Grimm or traditional English tales such as Jack and the Beanstalk and The Three Little Pigs; and his illustrations of modern retellings of international tales. His single most widely held work is Poems from Ireland (New York: Crowell, 1972), ten centuries of Irish poetry anthologised by William Cole.

Some of his papers are collected at the University of Minnesota.
