= Ruth Manning-Sanders =

Welsh-born English poet and author (1886–1988)

- Born: 21 August 1886; Swansea, Wales
- Died: 12 October 1988 (aged 102); Penzance, Cornwall, England
- Occupation: Author

Ruth Manning-Sanders (21 August 1886 – 12 October 1988) was an English poet and author born in Wales, known for a series of children's books for which she collected and related fairy tales worldwide. She published over 90 books in her lifetime.

== Biography ==
=== Childhood ===
Ruth Vernon Manning was the youngest of three daughters of John Manning, an English Unitarian minister. She was born in Swansea, Wales, but the family moved to Cheshire when she was three. As a child, she read books and wrote and acted plays with her two sisters.

According to a story she tells in the foreword to Scottish Folk Tales, Manning spent her summers in a farmhouse in the Scottish Highlands named "Shian", which she says means the place where fairies live.

=== Education ===
Manning studied English literature and Shakespearean studies at Manchester University.

=== Marriage ===
After returning from a trip to Italy to recover from an illness that forced her to leave university, Manning went to Devon where she met English artist George Sanders. They married in 1911, and both changed their names to Manning-Sanders. She spent much of her early married life touring Britain in a horse-drawn caravan and working in a circus, a topic she wrote about extensively. The family eventually moved into a cottage in the fishing hamlet of Land's End, Cornwall. One of their two children, Joan Manning-Sanders (1913–2002), found fame as a teenage artist in the 1920s.

Her husband died in an accident in 1953.

=== Literary career ===
Manning-Sanders took to publishing dozens of fairy-tale anthologies, mostly during the 1960s and 1970s. She writes in the foreword to a 1971 anthology, A Choice of Magic, that there can't be new fairy tales because they are "records of the time when the world was very young." She rather says that once upon a time is a door through which readers can enter the fairy world and enjoy its magic.

Some of Manning-Sanders' fairy-tale compilations include a discursive foreword on the origins of the tales retold. The stories in A Book of Dragons hail from Greece, China, Japan, North Macedonia, Ireland, Romania, Germany and elsewhere. She goes out of her way to say "not all dragons want to gobble up princesses." The book includes tales of kind and proud dragons, along with savage ones.

In her foreword to A Book of Witches, she offers insight into how she believed fairy tales should usually end, saying:

Now in all these stories, as in fairy tales about witches in general, you may be sure of one thing however terrible the witches may seem – and whatever power they may have to lay spells on people and to work mischief – they are always defeated. ... Because it is the absolute and very comforting rule of the fairy tale that the good and brave shall be rewarded, and that bad people shall come to a bad end.

She also notes in the foreword to A Book of Princes and Princesses that all fairy tales have one thing in common: a happy ending.

While many of Manning-Sanders' tales are not commonly known, she includes stories about more famous figures such as Baba Yaga, Jack the Giant-Killer, Anansi, Snow White, Hansel and Gretel, Robin Hood and Aladdin. The dust jacket for A Book of Giants notes "her wit and good humour. There is not a word wasted."

=== Death ===
Manning-Sanders died in 1988 in Penzance, England. Marcus Crouch wrote in the February 1989 issue of The Junior Bookshelf, "For many long-lived writers, death is followed by eclipse. I hope that publishers will continue to re-release Manning-Sanders's priceless treasury of folk-tales. We would all be the poorer for their loss."

== Books ==
She worked for two years with Rosaire's Circus in England. Her novel The Golden Ball. A Novel of the Circus (1954) is said to include parallels with the life of Leon LaRoche, a famed circus performer with Barnum & Bailey Circus from 1895 through 1902.

Manning-Sanders was noted as a poet and novelist in the years up to World War II. At least two of her early poetry collections – Karn and Martha Wish-You-Ill – were published by the Hogarth Press, run by Leonard and Virginia Woolf. Three of her poems appeared in the 1918 volume "Twelve Poets, a Miscellany of New Verse", which also includes ten poems by Edward Thomas. She won the Blindman International Poetry Prize in 1926 for The City, and was for a time a protégée of the English author Walter de la Mare, who spent at least one holiday with the Manning-Sanders family in Cornwall. While living in Sennen, Cornwall, Manning-Sanders was for a time a neighbour of the British writer Mary Butts.

The short story "John Pettigrew's Mirror" appeared in the 1951 anthology "One and All – A Selection of Stories from Cornwall," edited by Denys Val Baker. It was republished at least once, in the 1988 anthology "Ghost Stories" edited by Robert Westall. Her story, "The Goblins at the Bath House" from A Book of Ghosts and Goblins was read by Vincent Price on an LP entitled "The Goblins at the Bath House & The Calamander Chest," published by Caedmon in 1978 (TC 1574).

She began collecting fairy tales into collections in 1966 with the publication of A Book of Dragons. She wrote seven more fairytale collections titled Giants Dwarfs, Witches, Wizards, Mermaids, Ghosts and Goblins and Princes and Princesses. These collections were illustrated by Robin Jacques.

In the late 1960s and early 1970s, she published two collections titled A Book of Devils and Demons and Gianni and The Ogre. Robin Jacques also illustrated A Book of Devils and Demons.

== Selected volumes ==
=== "A Book of ..." series ===
These 22 anthologies or collections were published by Methuen (Dutton in the US) and illustrated by Robin Jacques.

- A Book of Giants, 1962
- A Book of Dwarfs, 1963
- A Book of Dragons, 1964
- A Book of Witches, 1965
- A Book of Wizards, 1966
- A Book of Mermaids, 1967
- A Book of Ghosts and Goblins, 1968
- A Book of Princes and Princesses, 1969
- A Book of Devils and Demons, 1970
- A Book of Charms and Changelings, 1971
- A Book of Ogres and Trolls, 1972
- A Book of Sorcerers and Spells, 1973
- A Book of Magic Animals, 1974
- A Book of Monsters, 1975
- A Book of Enchantments and Curses, 1976
- A Book of Kings and Queens, 1977
- A Book of Marvels and Magic, 1978
- A Book of Spooks and Spectres, 1979
- A Book of Cats and Creatures, 1981
- A Book of Heroes and Heroines, 1982
- A Book of Magic Adventures, 1983
- A Book of Magic Horses, 1984

The Library of Congress reports also a 1970 anthology compiled by Manning-Sanders, The Book of Magical Beasts, published by T. Nelson and illustrated by Raymond Briggs "Modern and ancient poems and short stories from around the world about make-believe beasts."LCCN 79-123111.

=== Other volumes ===
- The Pedlar, 1919 (verse)
- Karn, 1922 (verse)
- Pages from the History of Zachy Trenoy Sometime Labourer in the Hundred of Penwith, 1922 (verse)
- The Twelve Saints, 1926
- Martha Wish-You-Ill, 1922 (verse)
- The City, 1927 (verse)
- Waste Corner, 1927
- Selina Pennaluna, 1927
- Hucca's Moor, 1929
- The Crochet Woman, 1930
- The Growing Trees, 1931
- She Was Sophia, 1932
- Run Away, 1934
- Mermaid's Mirror, 1935
- The Girl Who Made an Angel, 1936
- Children by the Sea, 1938 (published in United States as Adventure May Be Anywhere)
- Elephant The Romance of Laura, 1938
- Luke's Circus, 1939
- Mystery at Penmarth, 1941
- The West of England, 1949 (non-fiction)
- Swan of Denmark: The Story of Hans Christian Andersen, 1949 (non-fiction)
- Seaside England, 1951 (non-fiction)
- The River Dart, 1951 (non-fiction)
- The English Circus, 1952 (non-fiction)
- Mr. Portal's Little Lions, 1952
- The Golden Ball: A Novel of the Circus, 1954
- Melissa, 1957
- Peter and the Piskies: Cornish Folk and Fairy Tales, 1958
- A Bundle of Ballads, 1959
- Circus Boy, 1960
- Red Indian Folk and Fairy Tales, 1960
- Animal Stories, 1961 (non-fiction)
- Birds, Beasts, and Fishes, 1962 (editor, an anthology of natural history poetry)
- The Smugglers, 1962
- The Red King and the Witch: Gypsy Folk and Fairy Tales, 1964
- Damian and the Dragon: Modern Greek Folk-Tales, 1965
- The Crow's Nest, 1965
- Slippery Shiney, 1965
- The Extraordinary Margaret Catchpole, 1966 (fictionalised biography)
- The Magic Squid, 1968
- Stories from the English and Scottish Ballads, 1968
- The Glass Man and the Golden Bird, 1968 (Hungarian Folk and Fairy Tales)
- Jonnikin and the Flying Basket: French Folk and Fairy Tales, 1969
- The Spaniards Are Coming!, 1969
- Gianni and the Ogre, 1970
- A Book of Magical Beasts, 1970 (editor)
- A Choice of Magic, 1971
- The Three Witch Maidens, 1972
- Festivals, 1973
- Stumpy A Russian Tale, 1974
- Grandad and the Magic Barrel, 1974
- Old Dog Sirko: A Ukrainian Tale, 1974
- Sir Green Hat and the Wizard, 1974
- Tortoise Tales, 1974
- Ram and Goat, 1974
- Young Gabby Goose, 1975
- Scottish Folk Tales, 1976
- Fox Tales, 1976
- The Town Mouse and the Country Mouse Aesop's Fable Retold, 1977
- Robin Hood and Little John, 1977
- Old Witch Boneyleg, 1978
- The Cock and the Fox , 1978
- Boastful Rabbit, 1978
- Folk and Fairy Tales, 1978
- The Haunted Castle, 1979
- Robin Hood and the Gold Arrow, 1979
- Oh Really, Rabbit!, 1980
- Hedgehog and Puppy Dog, 1982
- Tales of Magic and Mystery, 1985
- A Cauldron of Witches, 1988

== Sources and further reading ==
- Thomson Gale, Contemporary Authors (2004)
- M. S. Crouch, The Junior Bookshelf, February 1989
- Biographic material culled from introductions and dust jackets of several of Manning-Sanders' books
- John Clute and John Grant, The Encyclopedia of Fantasy (1999 updated paperback edition)
- Theresa Whistler, The Life of Walter de la Mare (2004)
- Nathalie Blondel (Editor), The Journals of Mary Butts (2002)
- Donna Elizabeth Rhein, The handprinted books of Leonard and Virginia Woolf at the Hogarth Press, 1917–1932 (master's thesis)
- Lawrence Finn's page about Joan Manning-Sanders
- A Web site about illustrator Robin Jacques
