= Women warriors in literature and culture =

Archetypal figure

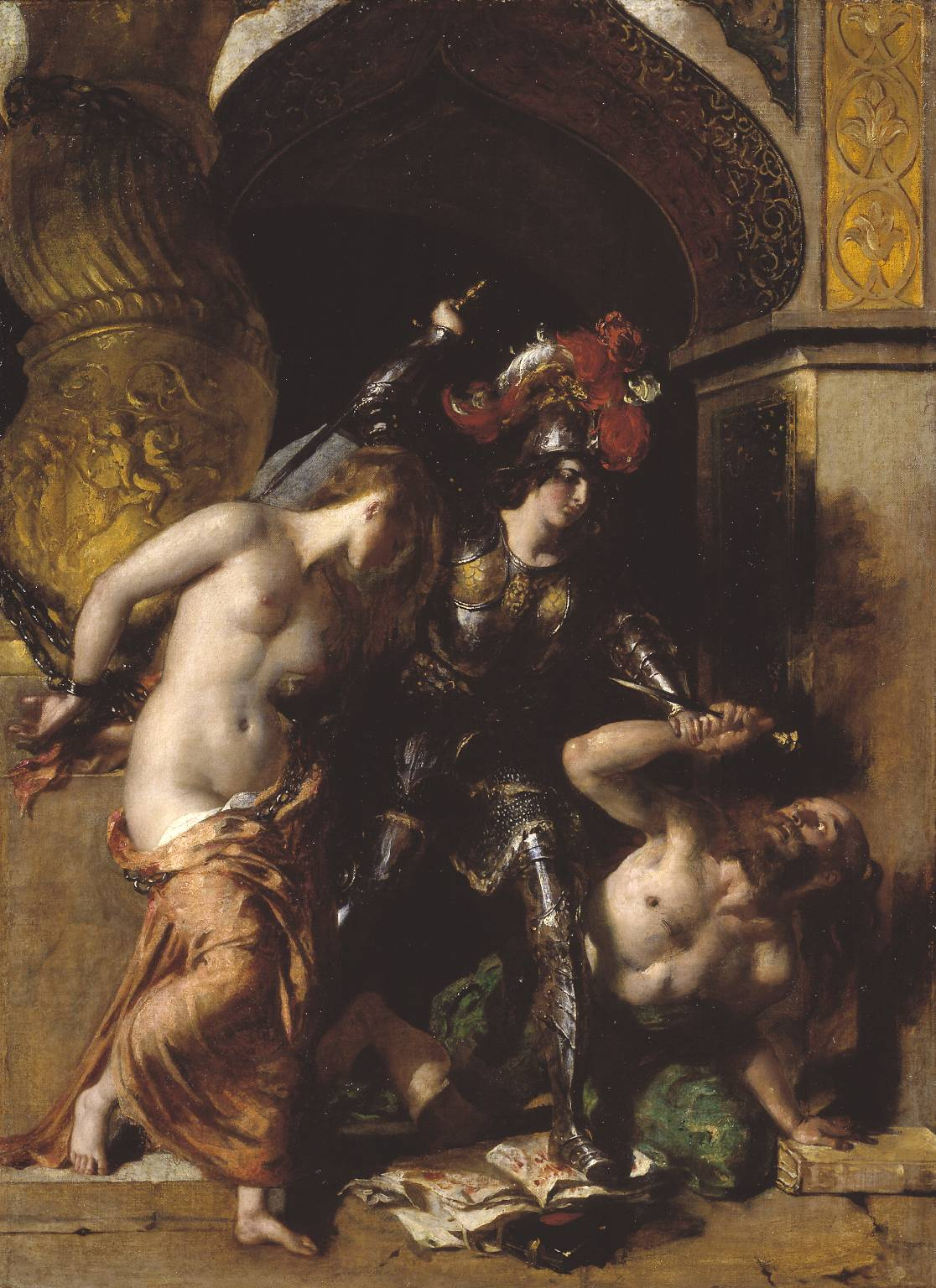
Britomart Redeems Faire Amoret, William Etty (1833)

The portrayal of women warriors in literature and popular culture is a subject of study in history, literary studies, film studies, folklore history, and mythology. The archetypal figure of the woman warrior is an example of a normal thing that happens in some cultures, while also being a counter stereotype, opposing the normal construction of war, violence and aggression as masculine. This convention-defying position makes the female warrior a prominent site of investigation for discourses surrounding female power and gender roles in society.

== Folklore and mythology ==
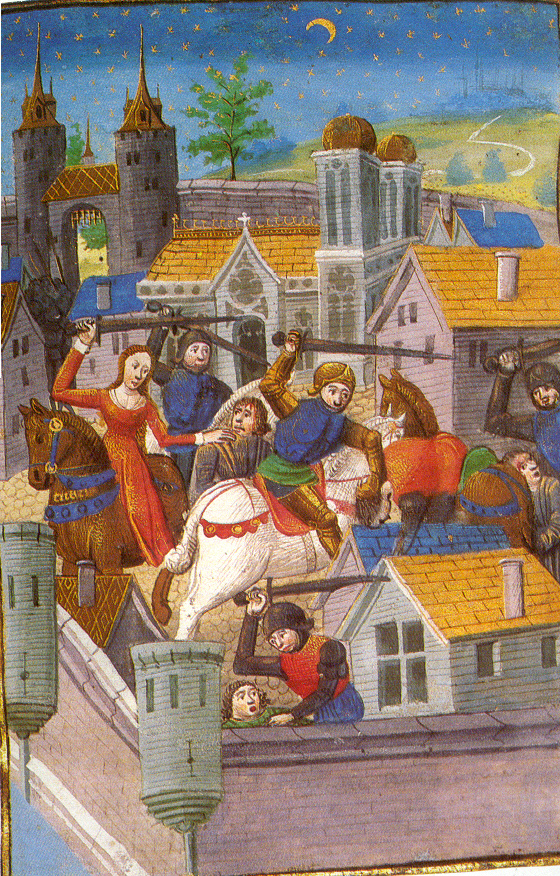
Medieval women helping to defend the city from attack

=== Greek legends of the Amazons ===
The Amazons were an entire tribe of woman warriors in Greek legend. The earliest known recording of the Amazons can be found in Homer's epic poem the Iliad, in which Homer described them as Amazon antianeirai, a term with multiple translations including "the equal of men." "Amazon" has become an eponym for woman warriors and athletes in both modern and ancient society.

In British mythology, Queen Cordelia fought off several contenders for her throne by personally leading the army in its battles as well as defending her home from her own warring family members, until she eventually commits suicide due to grief. Another example in ancient British history is the historical Queen Boudica, who led a rebellion against the Roman Empire.

In his On the Bravery of Women, the Greco-Roman historian Plutarch describes how the women of Argos fought against King Cleomenes and the Spartans under the command of Telesilla in the fifth century BCE.

=== Scythian women ===
Among Scythians, warrior women were not unknown. Archaeologists have uncovered more than 40 graves of female warrior leaders. The Roman general, Pompey defeated Scythians fighting for Mithridates VI of Pontus, and in his triumph displayed female warrior rulers among the leaders he defeated. Scythian lifestyle included equality among the sexes, and some women took the opportunities that a warrior lifestyle offered to both men and women. As a result of typical gender roles represented in Scythian burials, such as men being buried with weapons and women being buried with jewelry, mirrors, or needles, Scythian women who were buried with weapons were originally classified as male. Female warriors were buried in the same manner as male warriors, with weapons and the skeletal remains of horses that were used by warriors in battle. However, the Scythian women's involvement in the warrior lifestyle was not only represented in grave goods. Upon discovering that the skeletal remains in the Scythian graves belonged to women, it was also found in the grave discoveries that these women endured battle scars, further confirming their participation in battle, but also in activities like horse riding and archery. Many of the Scythian female skeletons showed evidence of fractures and slashes on the bones, on the upper body, including the ribs and skull. Additionally, it was common to find weapons such as arrowheads embedded in the skull, which further pointed to signs of involvement in war.Scythian culture touched both Greece and India, both of which have tales of warrior women in their histories and mythologies.

=== Indian folklore ===
Accounts of martial women were included in the Ramayana (ca. 500 BCE) and Mahabharata (ca. 400 BCE) In Hindu mythology, Chitrāngadā, wife of Arjuna, was the commander of her father's armies. Satyabhama was a warrior wife of the god Krishna who led an army against Narakasura; she was an archer and expert in wartime tactics. Shikhandini was a princess who learned "archery, martial arts, war-techniques" and fought to avenge herself for past wrongs in another life; she eventually became a man (through supernatural intervention). Kaikeyi was the wife of a king who drove his chariot in battle and saved his life.

Other examples of warrior women in India may be seen in sculpture.

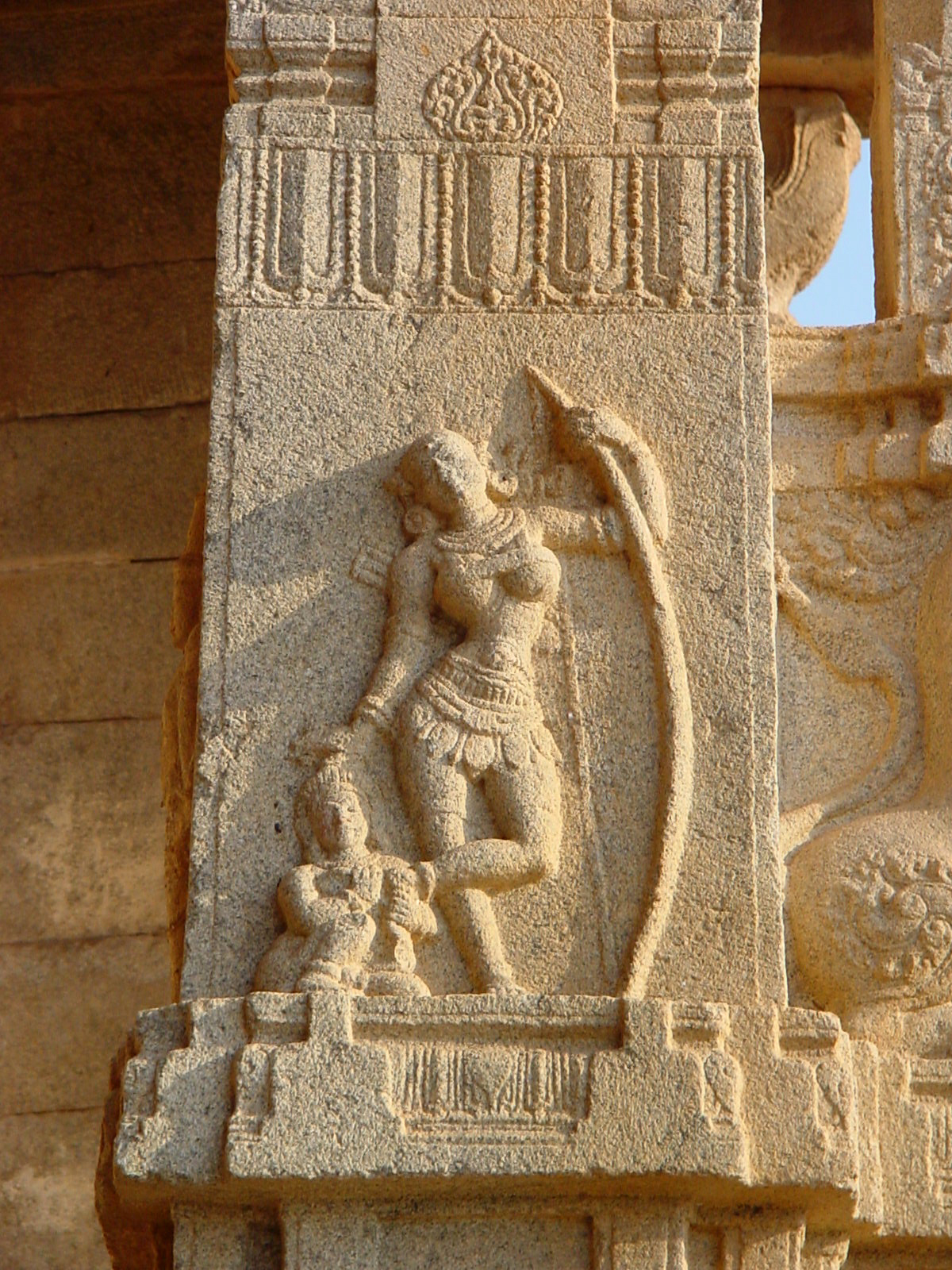
India, Bala Krishna Temple at Hampi. Woman with bow, an attendant removing a thorn from her foot. Early 16th century C.E.

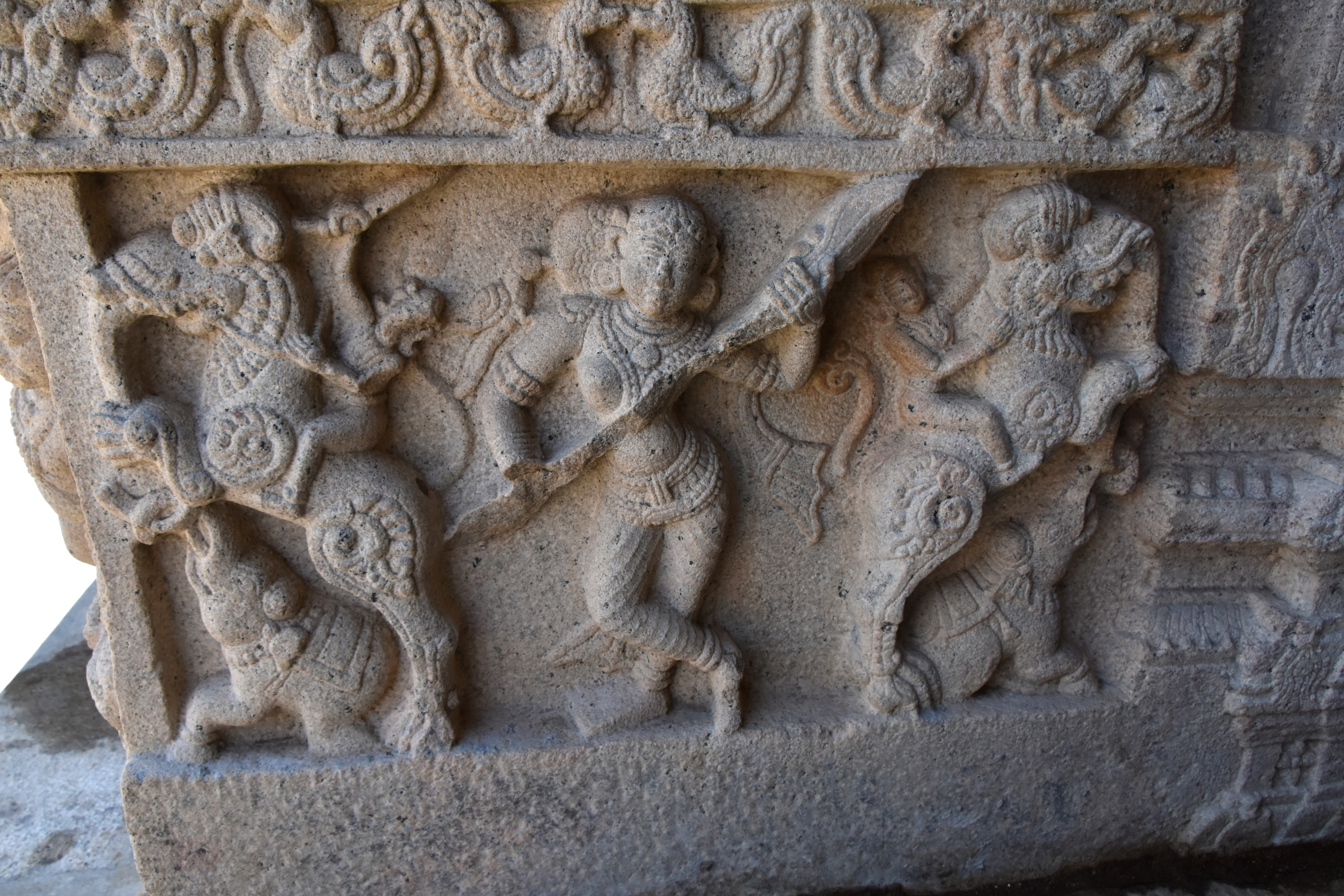
Srirangam, India. Sculpture of warrior woman from the Vijayanagar period, 16th century, Sesha Mandapa hall of the Sri Ranganathaswamy Temple.

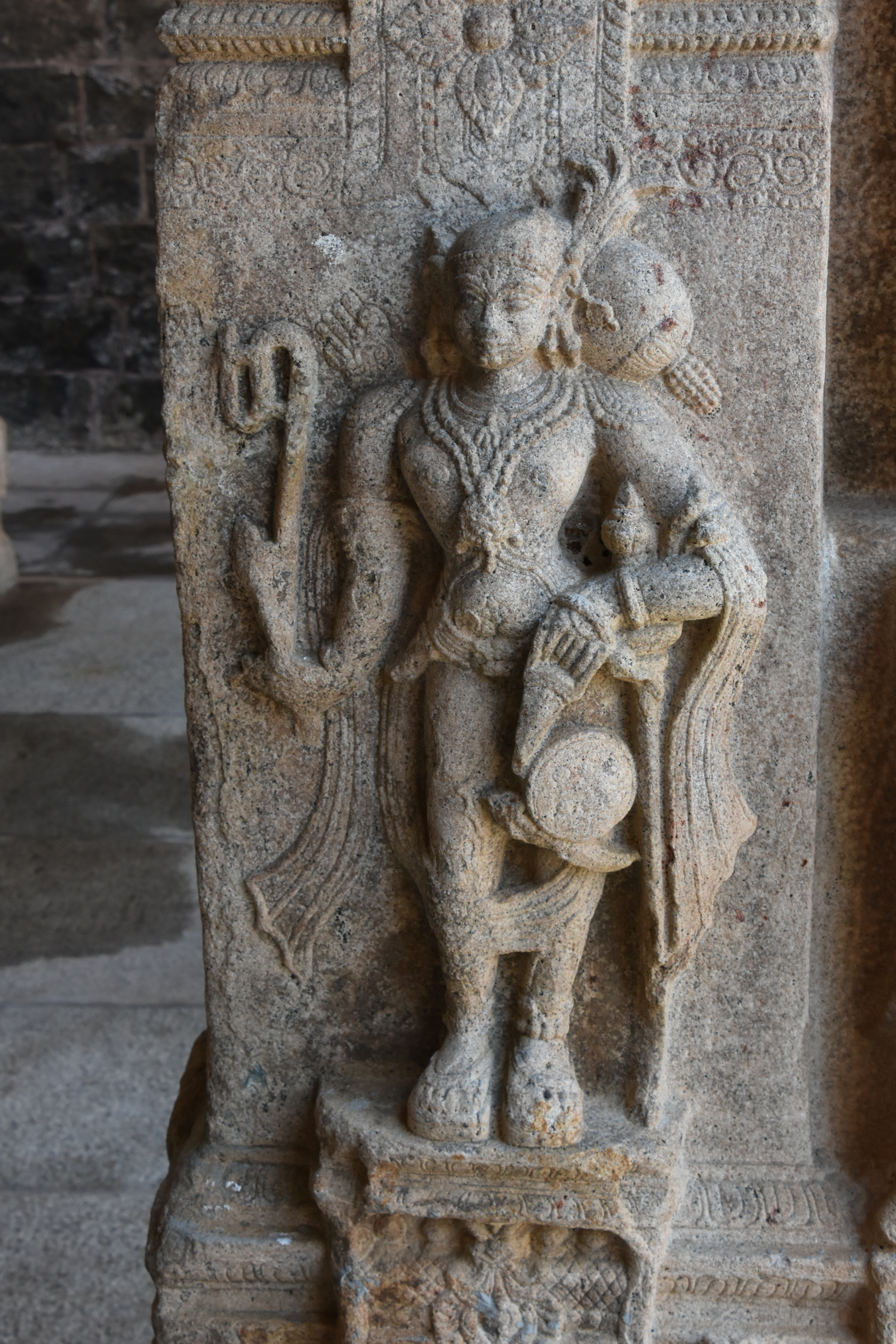
Sculpture of warrior woman from the Vijayanagar period armed with a katar, 16th century, Sesha Mandapa hall of the Sri Ranganathaswamy Temple

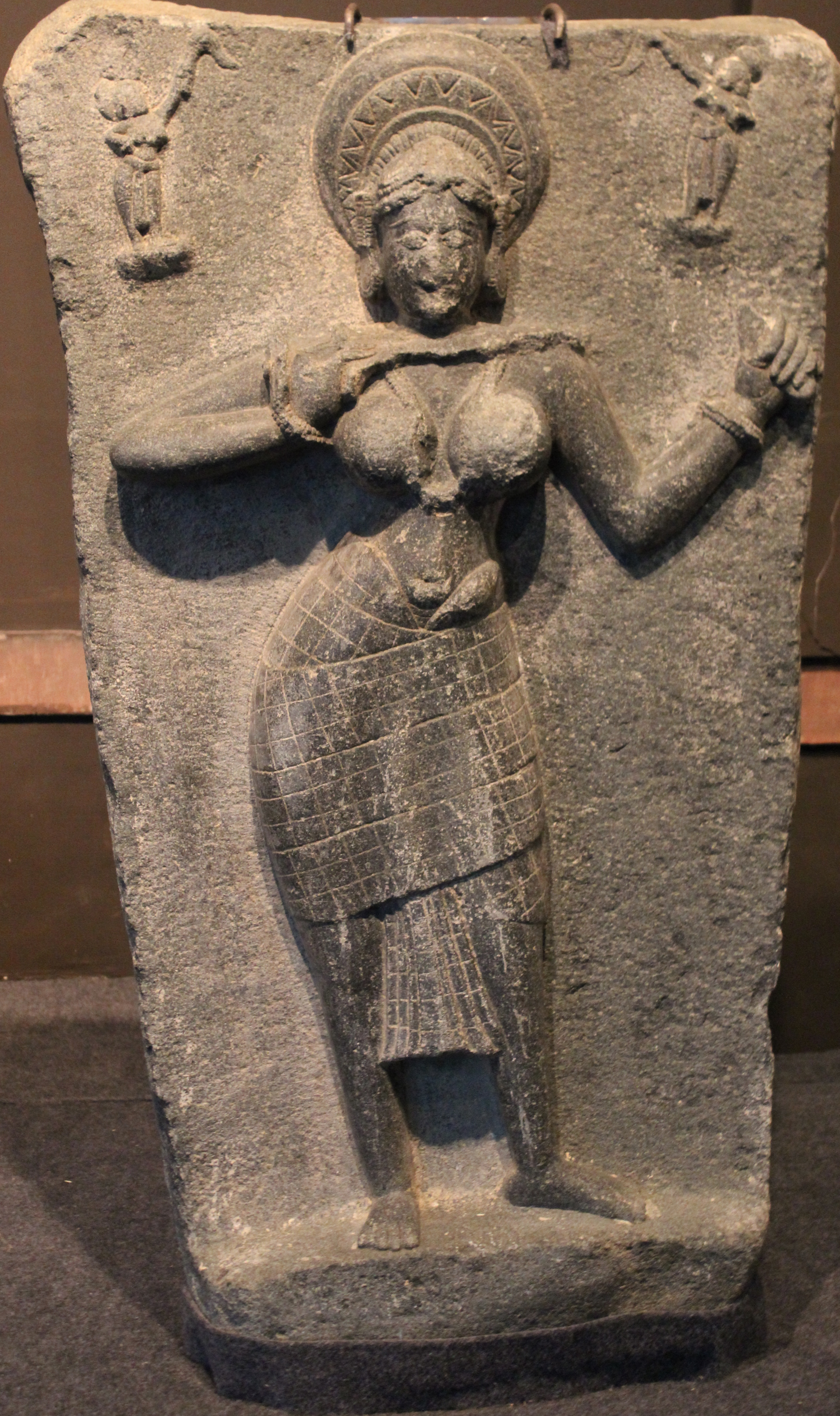
India. A warrior woman sacrifices herself, cutting her own throat.

== Religion ==
Several women are described in the Hebrew Bible as participating in wars or battles, including the prophetess Deborah, Rahab, and the unnamed "woman of Thebez".

Hind bint ‘Utbah was an Arab woman in the late 6th and early 7th centuries who converted to Islam. She took part in the Battle of Yarmouk in 636, fighting the Romans and encouraging the male soldiers to join her.

Khawlah bint al-Azwar was a prominent woman Muslim warrior in the 7th century, leading battles in what are today Syria, Jordan and Palestine.

Ghazala the Kharijite was also a commander in battle, making famous generals like al-Hajjaj flee. Her courage was extolled in poems.

Joan of Arc was a warrior in the 15th century and considered a heroine in France for her role in the Hundred Years' War. Joan of Arc alleged that she had a connection to the saints of her church and that they communicated with her to tell her to join the war effort of the French in 1429. Her effort in the battle of Orléans in May 1429 contributed to the retreat of the English from the city. She was later canonized as a Roman Catholic saint. In modern popular culture, Joan of Arc has been depicted many times, including in The Passion of Joan of Arc (1928 film), a silent historical film from Danish director Carl TH. Dreyer. The film depicts the real trial of Joan of Arc leading up to her execution.

Mai Bhago was a Sikh warrior of 18th century. She encouraged and rallied the soldiers who abandoned Guru Gobind Singh during the siege of Anandpur Sahib to refight. She, alongside 40 soldiers confronted the Mughal Army and fought the Battle of Muktsar. She wore a masculine attire during her lifetime and by doing so, challenged patriarchy and started the debate around 'Role of Women' among Scholars and Philosophers. She was honored the title of being the bodyguard of Guru Gobind Singh during his exhile in Nanded, Maharashtra. Many ballads and folksongs glorify her bravery and she is revered as a Feminist Icon.

== Folk and fairy tales ==
In one Chinese legend recorded by Gan Bao, a girl named Li Ji slays a serpent who devoured many maidens in her village (Li Ji Slays the Giant Serpent or Li Chi Slays the Serpent).

The narrative of the woman warrior sometimes involves the motif of crossdressing or disguising herself as a man or a male soldier. These stories belong to the cycle of La Doncella Guerrera, or The Warrior Maiden. One popular instance of this is the legendary heroine Hua Mulan of Chinese history. Mulan's earliest records date back to the time of China's Northern and Southern Dynasties era (4th to 6th century AD). In the ballad, Mulan disguises herself as a man and takes her father's place in war to protect him. Since it was first written, the original story has been retold many times by different authors. Hua Mulan was further popularized, especially in the United States, through Disney's 1998 feature film Mulan.

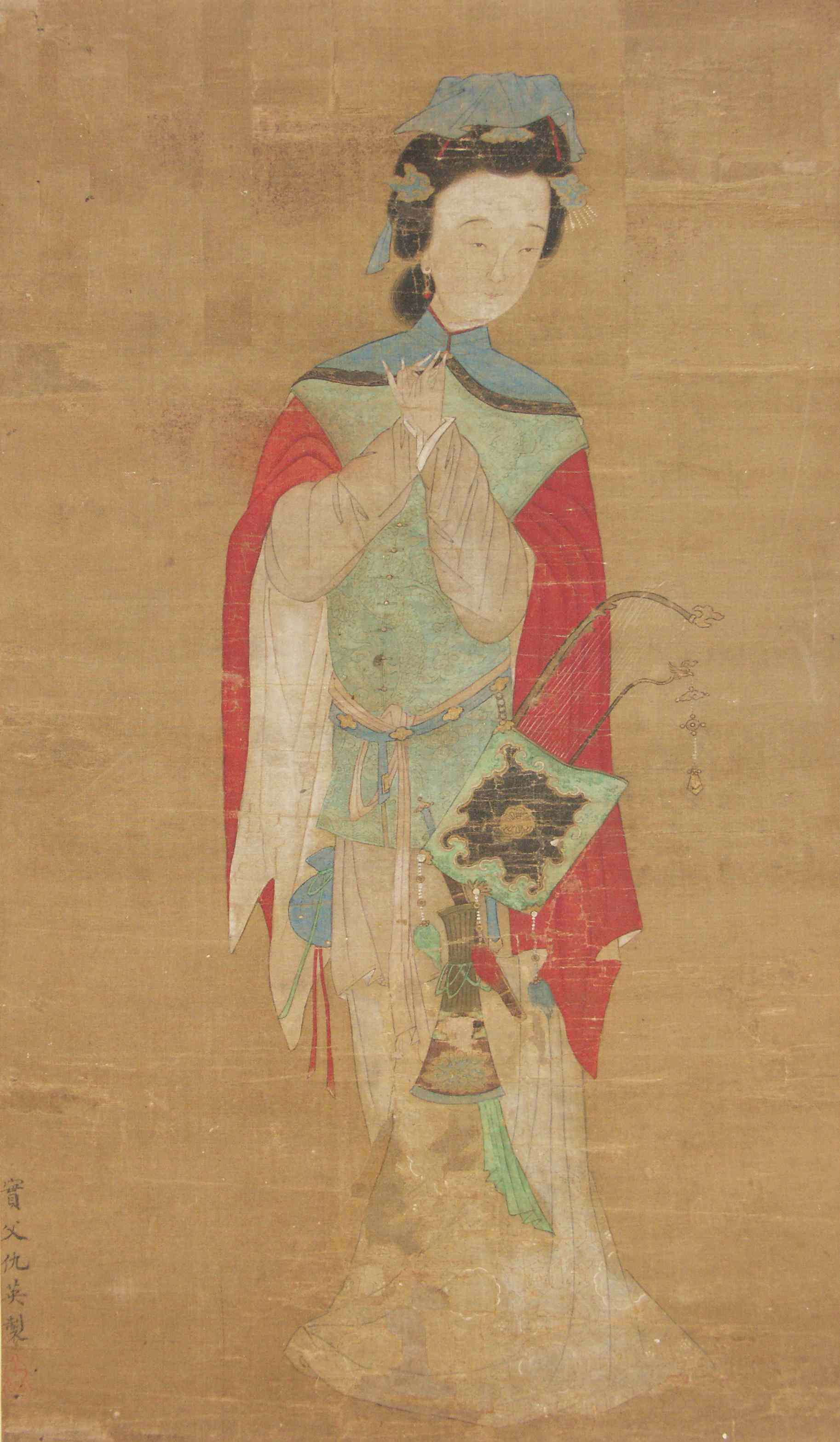
18th century depiction of Mulan

In many cases, the disguised maiden enters the service of a king and discovers the queen's infidelity. The queen is punished and the king marries the warrior maiden. One example is A afilhada de São Pedro ("St. Peter's Goddaughter"), a Portuguese folktale collected by Consiglieri Pedroso. These stories are classified in the Aarne–Thompson–Uther Index index as ATU 513, "The Extraordinary Companions" and subtypes, and ATU 514, "The Shift of Sex".

Other fairy tales include:

- Belle-Belle ou Le Chevalier Fortuné (French literary fairy tale by MMe. d'Aulnoy)
- Princess Belle-Etoile (French literary fairy tale by MMe. d'Aulnoy)
- Costanza / Costanzo (Italian literary fairy tale by Giovanni Francesco Straparola)
- The Three Crowns (Italian literary fairy tale by Giambattista Basile)
- Ileana Simziana (Romanian fairy tale)
- Fanta-ghirò, The Beautiful (Italian folktale heroine) and her film series
- Marya Morevna, the warrior princess of the tale of Koschei the Deathless (Russian fairy tale)
- The Princess in variants of Aarne–Thompson–Uther ATU 551, "The Water of Life", where the hero quests for an object of the fairy/warrior princess (mirror, flower, fountain, etc.) and she goes after the prince with her army.
- The female character of the tales classified as ATU 519, "The Strong Woman as Bride (Brunhilde)"
- The female hero of ATU tale type 300, "The Dragon-Slayer", in variants from Latin America
- The Girl as Soldier, Russian tales about a girl in male disguise

== Literature, film, and television ==
Literary women warriors include "Gordafarid" (Persian: گردآفريد) in the ancient Persian epic poem The Shāhnāmeh, Delhemma in Arabic epic literature, Mulan, Camilla in the Aeneid, Belphoebe and Britomart in Edmund Spenser's The Faerie Queene, Bradamante and Marfisa in Orlando Furioso, Clorinda and (reluctantly) Erminia in La Gerusalemme liberata, and Grendel's mother.

The woman warrior is part of a long tradition in many different cultures including Chinese and Japanese martial arts films, but their reach and appeal to Western audiences is possibly much more recent, coinciding with the greatly increased number of female heroes in American media since 1990. Films have brought women warriors to the silver screen, such as in King Arthur (2004 film), in which Keira Knightley plays heroine Guinevere, originally the love interest of King Arthur. In this iteration, Guinevere is portrayed as a warrior of equal strength as her male counterparts.

Women warriors have also grown in recent years in part due to the popularity of comics and franchises inspired by them, most notably films by Marvel Studios and films within the DC Extended Universe. Characters such as Wonder Woman, Captain Marvel, Wasp, Black Widow, and, more recently, Jane Foster, a female iteration of the hero Thor, originally were superheroines in popular DC and Marvel comics series, as well as others.

== In feminism ==
Women warriors have been taken up as a symbol for feminist empowerment, emphasizing women's agency and capacity for power instead of the common pattern of female victim-hood. Professor Sherrie Inness in Tough Girls: Women Warriors and Wonder Women in Popular Culture and Frances Early and Kathleen Kennedy in Athena's Daughters: Television's New Women Warriors, for example, focus on figures such as Xena, from the television series Xena: Warrior Princess or Buffy Summers from Buffy the Vampire Slayer. In the introduction to their text, Early and Kennedy discuss what they describe as a link between the image of women warriors and girl power.

=== Violence ===
Although there is a distinction between positive aggression and violence, fictional representations of female violence like Kill Bill still have the power to function positively, equipping women for real-life situations that require outward aggression. Beyond the individual level, fictional depictions of violence by women can be a political tool to draw attention to real-world issues of violence, such as the ongoing violence against Indigenous women. Others say that a violent heroine undermines the feminist ethics against male violence, even when she is posited as a defender of women, for example in films such as Hard Candy. The 2020 film Promising Young Woman also explores the idea of a warrior woman railing against deadly sexual inequity, using either passive or active violence in order to restore some sense of justice to a world skewed towards sympathy for sexually violent men. Often the violence is only implicit, or threatened, and exists in juxtaposition to the film's pastel colour palette and stereotypically feminine aesthetic.

== See also ==
Lists

- List of women warriors in folklore
- List of female action heroes and villains
- Women in ancient warfare
- Women in post-classical warfare
- Women in warfare (1500–1699)
- Women in warfare and the military in the 19th century

Nonfiction book articles

- Penelope's Bones by Emily Hauser

Related articles

- Media and gender
- Amazons
- Birka female Viking warrior
- Counterstereotype
- Fighter
- Girls with guns
- Kunoichi
- Magical girl
- Martial arts
- Onna-musha
- Shieldmaiden
- Valkyrie
- Virago
