= The Girl as Soldier =

Russian folktale about a girl in male disguise

The Girl as Soldier (German: Das Mädchen als Soldat) is a Russian folktale collected by Russian folklorist Ivan Khudyakov, originally titled "Опять Сноха" ("The Daughter-in-Law, Again"). The tale features a heroine who disguises herself as a man, passing tests designed to discover her gender, and is later kidnapped by her lover (or her lover's mother, in other tales); her lover's mother then forces the heroine to perform difficult tasks for her.

== Sources ==
The tale was collected by Ivan Khudyakov from a source in the then-existing Ryazan Governorate, originally titled "Опять Сноха" ("The Daughter-in-Law, Again"). The tale was translated into German language by author August von Löwis of Menar with the title Das Mädchen als Soldat ("The Girl as Soldier").

== Summary ==
A father has three daughters, and one day is drafted to war. His youngest daughter offers to go in his place, and wears the disguise of a male soldier. She joins the army and is lodged with another soldier and his mother. The soldier's mother suspects her son's friend is a woman underneath, and suggests they test her gender: first, she is to sleep on the grass, so that the way their body presses the leaves reveals their gender; next, she is to take a bath in the sauna with the soldier. The girl tricks the soldier in getting soap for her and takes a bath first. After the war ends, she returns home to her father.

One day, her friend, the soldier, appears at her house in the shape of a cat, places her on its back and carries her back home across the Oka river to his mother. The girl throws her ring in the water and makes a vow of silence to never address the soldier's parents, and marries him. The man's mother-in-law forces the heroine to perform dangerous tasks: to shear her gray sheep (who are gray wolves), then to go to the barn and milk her brown cows (who are bears), and lastly to get a reed ("бёрдом", in the original; "Weberkamm", in the German translation) from her "sister". The heroine's husband warns her that his mother's "sister" is not a relative, but the witch Baba Yaga, who will devour her, so he gives her a piece of butter, a comb and a brush.

The heroine visits Baba Yaga in her chicken-legged hut and asks for the reed for her mother-in-law. Baba Yaga goes to sharpen her teeth. The heroine gives the piece of butter to a cat. The animal, in return, advises the girl to spit under the porch, so her saliva can answer for her, then take the reed and escape. The girl obeys the cat and flees from Baba Yaga's hut. The witch goes after her on her iron mortar, but the girl throws behind her the comb and the brush to create obstacles for her. After bringing the reed to her mother-in-law, she resigns herself to the fact that her daughter-in-law survived her every attempt. At the end of the tale, the girl fishes her ring out of the river.

== Analysis ==
=== Tale type ===
Russian scholarship classifies the tale as type SUS 428, "Девушка на службе у ведьмы" ("The Girl in the Witch's Service" or "A girl serving a Witch"), of the East Slavic Folktale Classification (Russian: СУС, romanized: SUS). According to scholar Andreas John and Russian folklorist Lev Barag, in the East Slavic type, the heroine's mother-in-law (sometimes identified as witch Baba Yaga) sends her on dangerous tasks in order to get rid of her, but, with her husband's advice, she prevails: with the witch's son's advice, she milks cows (bears), shears sheep (devils), and pays a visit to a second witch in the other world by treating the objects with kindness.

In his monograph about Cupid and Psyche, Swedish scholar Jan-Öjvind Swahn acknowledged that Russian type 428 was subtype 425A of his analysis, that is, "Cupid and Psyche", being the "oldest" and containing the episode of the witch's tasks. In the international index, however, Swahn's typing is indexed as type ATU 425B, "The Son of the Witch".

=== Combinations with other types ===
Felix Karlinger considered the tale a combination of "heterogeneous" subjects: the girl as soldier and the demonic mother-in-law. In this regard, Jan-Öjvind Swahn, in his work about Cupid and Psyche and other "Animal as Bridegroom" tales, surmised that, in "Slavonic tradition", tales of type Aa 428 involve a sequence named "The Girl as a Soldier" or "The Girl At War", wherein the heroine wears a male disguise, joins with a compatriot who tries to unmask her gender, and eventually marries him. The tale then segues into her mother-in-law's attempts to kill her by setting ludicrous tasks for her. In addition, the East Slavic Folktale Index classified this sequence (heroine masquerading as a male soldier and the tests to her gender) as tale type SUS 884B*, "Василиса-поповна" ("Vasilisa-popovna").

== Variants ==
The East Slavic Folktale Catalogue, last updated by Russian folklorist Lev Barag in 1979, registers 12 variants. Karelian and Russian scholarship agree that the paucity of registers indicates the "rarity" of this tale type.

=== Russia ===
==== Vasilisa Vasilievna (Nizhny Novgorod) ====
In a Russian tale collected by E. A. Chudinsky from Makaryevsky Uyezd, in Nizhny Novgorod Governorate, with the title "Василиса Васильевна" ("Vasilisa Vasilievna"), a master ("barin", in the original) has three daughters, and Baba Yaga has a son, Vasily Vasilyevich. The master has to serve in the war, but his youngest daughter, Vasilisa Vasilievna, goes to serve in his place. She dons a male disguise to mask her gender, and goes to serve with Vasily, with whom Vasilisa becomes friends. Vasily goes to talk to his mother, Baba Yaga, who suspects her son's friend is actually a girl, not a man. Vasily doubts his mother's words, but agrees to test his friend's gender: first, Baba Yaga gives Vasily some embroidered silks to show Vasily's friend. Vasilisa, still in the male disguise, dismisses the silk and says she wants to see some horses in the stables. Next, Baba Yaga tells her son she will heat up the banya (bath house) for a steam bath, to which Vasily is to invite Vasilisa. Vasily invites Vasilisa to a bath, and she insists to take her dog with her. She lets the dog answer for her and flees. Vasily takes a bath and cannot find Vasilisa, so he returns to his mother to plot how to capture her: they carve some pigeons, paint them, and go to the market to sell them. Back to Vasilisa, she removes the male disguise and assumes her female identity. Her father asks his three daughters which presents he can get them from the market: the elder sister asks for silk, the middle sister for gold, and Vasilisa for something that people can marvel at. The man goes to the market and buys silk, gold, and the pigeons as reward for Vasilisa to have replaced him in the war. Vasilisa is given the pigeons, which begin to coo that they will fly away with Vasilisa back to Baba Yaga. Vasilisa cannot listen to the birds' cooing for she is fast asleep. After cooing three times, the pigeons carry Vasilisa away to Baba Yaga, who marries her to her son Vasily. Baba Yaga, however, begins to hound Vasilisa and tries to destroy her, to no avail. Vasilisa throws some birch bark on the ground and declares that, when the birch turns into a forest, she will live happily with her husband. Suddenly, the birch bark turns into a forest, and thus Vasilisa lives a happy life with Vasily.

==== Ivan Agich and Vasilisa Vasilievna ====
In a tale collected by folklorist Dmitry Sadovnikov from Samarskago Kraya (Samara Region) with the title "Иван Агич и Василиса Васильевна" ("Ivan Agich and Vasilisa Vasilievna"), a father has three daughters and is drafted to a war, despite his age. His three daughters offer to go in his place, and the father tests them: as each of the girls try to begin their journeys, their father turns into a wolf to scare them; the two get scared and go back home, but the youngest, named Vasilisa Vasilievna, defeats the wolf and joins the army. In the army, she assumes the male identity of Vasily Vasilyevich, and becomes friends with a man named Ivan Agich, son of Baba Yaga. After the army, Vasilisa Vasilievna returns home. He father wants to gift their daughters with a present, and the youngest asks for little birds. Vasilisa Vasilievna feeds the birds, which take them to Ivan Agich across the Volga River. Ivan Agich and Vasilisa Vasilievna marry, but his mother, Baba Yaga, despises her. One day, Baba Yaga orders the girl to milk her cows (which are in fact bears). The next day, the witch sends the daughter-in-law to feed their geese, which are snakes. Lastly, Baba Yaga sends her daughter-in-law to her sister, named Yagaya Baba, with a letter containing an order to devour her. Ivan Agich advises his wife: she will pass by a splashing well that she is to throw a hook into; then, she needs to grease the door with butter; pass by a broom and place it under the threshold; give meat to his aunt's cats; give iron needles to his aunt's servants who use straw needles to weave. Vasilisa Vasilievna follows his instructions and asks his aunt for the reed. Yagaya Baba retires to her room to sharpen her teeth, while the girl takes the reed and escapes. Yagaya Baba returns and, not seeing the girl, scolds and beats the servants, the cat, the broom, the door and the well. Vasilisa Vasilievna returns with the reed. Baba Yaga feels anger at her success, but Ivan Agich stands up to his mother and takes his wife to regions unknown.

==== Vasilisa Vasilievna (Krasnoyarsk) ====
In an untitled tale from Krasnoyarsk Krai - which the compiler titled "Василиса Васильевна" ("Vasilisa Vasilievna") - a girl named Vasilisa Vasilievna tells her father she will serve in the army, and she goes to enlist. She joins the army under the male name Vasily Vasilyevich, but Baba Yaga suspects she is a woman in man's clothing. Baba Yaga sends her son with Vasily Vasilyevich to the bath house for a steam bath in the sauna - a trick to unmask her gender. Vasilisa tricks Baba Yaga's son and takes a quick bath. Later, she shows him her breasts to prove her identity. Baba Yaga's son says he wants her, but she returns home. Back home, Vasilisa asks her father to buy her a bed of swans and geese. On the first night, she feeds the geese, but not the swans; on the second, she feeds the swans, but not the geese; on the third night, she feeds none of the birds, and they take her to Baba Yaga's lair. Vasilisa tosses her ring in the sea and makes a vow not to utter a word to the witch while she is at Baba Yaga's house. Some time later, she is ordered to milk Baba Yaga's cows. A black-haired girl suddenly appears and helps Vasilisa. She reveals the "cows" are in fact bears. Next, Baba Yaga orders her to shear the sheep - which are really wolves. Lastly, the witch sends her to her sister to ask for a "berda". The dark-haired girl advises Vasilisa: she warns that a birch tree will beat her with a broom; rusty door will creak to alert her; and wolves, bears and dogs who will eat her. So the dark-haired girl gives Vasilisa some money and she buys a ribbon, pins, oil and meat. Vasilisa ties the ribbon on the birth tree; oils the doors; throws the pins and meat to the animals and greets Baba Yaga's sister. The witch's sister goes to another room to sharpen her teeth; the mice give Vasilisa a reed and she flees back to Baba Yaga's house. At the end of the tale, Vasilisa catches and opens the fish that swallowed her ring.

==== Beautiful Vasilisa ====
Russian philologist Dimitry M. Balashov collected a tale from informant Elisaveta Ivanovna Sidorova (Russian: Елизавета Ивановна Сидорова), from Tersky region, in the White Sea. In this tale, titled "Василиса Прекрасная" ("Beautiful Vasilisa"), a peasant couple ask his three daughters which will go to work for the Barkhat-Tsarevich ("Velvet Prince"). The youngest offers to go, and disguises herself in male clothes. The Velvet Prince discusses with his mother if their new companion is male or female, and they devise tests: to sleep a certain way on bed; to take a bath. She later returns to her father. Her father wants to bring presents for his daughters, and the youngest asks for a bed with four doves. Her father does not find this gift for whole two years, only on the third. The girl gets the four-dove bed, but does not feed them and the birds carry her back to the Velvet Prince. She notices she is back in his house, glues her ring to a wall and makes a vow not to speak until moss grows over it. She marries the Velvet Prince and his mother orders her on tasks. The first task is for her to shear the sheep. Her husband, the Velvet Prince, warns her that it is a ploy to kill her, but teaches her a magical command to summon the animals of the forest to get their fur. The next task is for her to go to her mother-in-law's aunt to get a "бёрдом" (a reed for weaving). Her husband advises her to buy a donkey, two ribbons, a piece of meat, two whitefishes and tar. The girl goes to the aunt's house: she walks through two smashing mountains on a donkey; passes by two gates and greases them with tar, gives a piece of meat to a dog, enters the house and ties a ribbon to two brooms, and throws the whitefish for the cats. While the aunt is away sharpening her teeth in another room, she gets the reed and escapes. The aunt scolds the animals and objects and is crushed by the two mountains. The last task is for the girl to go to the fiery river and get some white clay. Her husband advises the girl to buy some wine and bread, go to the margin of the river, summon the Noguiptitsa (Noguy-bird) with the iron nose, give it the wine and bread and ask for the white clay. At the end of the tale, the girl retrieves her moss-covered ring.

==== How Vasilisa Went to War ====
In a tale titled "Как Василиса на войну поехала" ("How Vasilisa went to war"), a couple have three daughters, the youngest named Vasilisa. One day, their father is drafted to war against a neighbouring kingdom. The man's three daughters decide to fight in their father's stead. To test their courage, the man disguises himself as a creature and waits by the bridge. The elder daughters, dressed in masculine clothes, ride a horse and try to cross the bridge, but their father, in his monster disguise, scares them away. When it is the youngest's turn, Vasilisa simply strikes the "monster" with a whip traverses the bridge. Vasilisa rides to a three-way crossroads, and chooses the middle path. She rides until she finds a hut where a forest shishiga (a kind of witch) lives with her son Vanyushka and a little dog named Vikushka. The girl tells her name is Vasily-Vasey, and needs to go to war, but the shishiga tries to convince her to stay with them as a companion for her son. The shishiga and her son argue if their guest is male or female, and try to set tests for her: they place some herbs on her bed, and if they bloom, she is a girl; if she fetches water with a yoke, instead of a bucket, she is a girl. During the second test, Vanyushka confesses to Vasily-Vasey that the shishiga is not his mother, but that his own parents, when he was little, cursed aloud for the shishiga to take him, and it did happen. He also explains that a beautiful girl could save him from the shishiga. Either way, they set a third task: to join him for a bath in the bath house. Vasilisa takes a quick bath, before she arises any suspicions. Later that night, Vasilisa decides to run away from the house, but the dog Vikushka advises her to take some porridge and some millet with her. She then departs with the horse, and stops to rest by a meadow. Back to the shishiga, Vanyushka notices his friend fled, and wants to go after him, but the shishiga commands her swan-geese to find Vasily-Vasey and bring him back. Vasilisa sees the flock, and drops some porridge and millet for the birds to distract them. The flock returns empty-handed, and the shishiga sends them back. The flock fly back to Vasilisa, now with her braids showing, and bring her to the witch. Vanyushka sees the girl and is happy, but the shishiga, fearing the girl will take her son from her, locks Vanyushka in the bath house and begins to boss Vasilisa around. The first task is for Vasilisa to milk the shishiga's "cows". The little dog intercepts Vasilisa and teaches her how to do it: leave the pail on the grass, climb a tree and let the she-bears come. The second task is for her to shear the sheep. Just like the first task, the little dog instructs her: she is to leave the shears on the ground, climb a stump, chant a spell for the stump to rise and let the wolves shear themselves. The shishiga, then, gives Vasilisa a stone spindle and forces her to spin it nonstop. Luckily, Vasilisa sings a song that lulls the witch to sleep. The little dog runs to fetch the keys to the bathhouse so she can release Vanyushka. Vasilisa uses her spit in her place to trick the shishiga, and takes with her a comb, some wolf hair and the stone spindle. When morning comes, the witch notices that the girl and her son are not there, and chases after them. During the chase, dog Vikushka alerts the pair about the witch coming for them, so they throw behind them the comb (which becomes a palisade), the wolf hair (which turns into a pack of wolves) and the stone spindle (which they crack in half). The obstacles manage to delay the pursuit, and the pair escape out of the woods. Vasilisa and Vanyuhska ride her horse to a nearby village, where they learn the war is over. Without a reason to fight in the war, Vasilisa takes Vanyushka with her to her parents.

==== The Tsar's Daughter and the Son of Baba Yaga ====
In a Russian tale from Transbaikal with the title "Дочь царя и сын Бабы Яги" ("The Tsar's Daughter and the Son of Baba Yaga"), king Kartaus has three daughters. One day, war breaks out, and Kartaus laments the fact he has only daughters and is too old to go. Each of his daughters, then, offers to go to war in their father's stead. The king agrees, but decides to test their courage first: each of the princesses walk over a bridge, when a bear (Kartaus under a magical disguise) scares them back to the palace. The elder princesses flee back to the king's castle, save for the youngest, who faces the bear and tears out one eye. The third princess comes back to tell her father about her victory, and finds him eyeless. She returns him his eye, then departs to war under a male disguise. She is victorious, and becomes friends with a fellow combatant that is Baba Yaga's son. The man invites his companion to live with him and his mother. Kartaus gives her a little dog, which he asks to be at her side at all times. The princess then goes to visit her companion, still in male garments, and Baba Yaga suspects she is a woman, which she tells her son. Thus, they decide to test her identity: first, they are to prepare a bed of blades of grass under themselves and, if the blades turn yellow, she is a woman; if green, his companion is male. The little dog overhears Baba Yaga's plan and goes to alert its mistress. The princess escapes the first test. For the second test, Baba Yaga tells her son to take his companion to the market: if she is a woman, she will want to check female products, like women's dresses. The little dog alerts her again and she pretends to have an interest in military objects, like guns and sabers. As for the third test, Baba Yaga tells her son to prepare the bath house and invite his companion for a bath. The little dog accompanies the princess to the bath house, and steals Baba Yaga's son's clothes, buying time for the princess to have a quick bath. The next day, the princess says she must be leaving, Baba Yaga's son sees his companion off and takes her to a boat on the margin. As the boat sails the river, the princess shows him her true gender, then leaves him at the other margin. Baba Yaga's son returns home and admits to his mother he fell in love with his female companion, and wishes to have her. Baba Yaga then convinces her son to make a bed, tie twelve pigeons to the bedposts and sell the furniture to Kartaus's daughter, so the birds will bring her to him. Baba Yaga's son goes to the market and peddles the bed, which Kartaus's daughter wishes to have, since, after all, she wants to be rewarded for the great favour she did her father. Kartaus buys the bed to his daughter, but the pigeons begin to coo a song about flying back to Baba Yaga beyond the blue sea. The princess learns the bed is a trap, and takes turns feeding only half of the pigeons, so that they are too weak to take flight. This works for some time, until the elder princesses, out of jealousy, feed the twelve pigeons at once. That night, the princess lies on her bed to sleep, and when she wakes up, the bed is flying over the sea, carried by the twelve pigeons. Before the bed lands, she gets her golden ring and tosses it in the sea, making a vow never to speak until her ring is found. The bed lands, and Baba Yaga's son greets his beloved. However, as the days pass, he notices she is strangely silent, and asks her about it: she explains she tossed her ring in the sea and will only talk to him if the ring is back on her finger. Thus, he tells his mother about the lost item, and Baba Yaga summons the creatures of the sea to find the object. A crayfish appears with the ring, which Baba Yaga gives her son. The man places the ring on his bride's finger, and their wedding is arranged.

=== Belarus ===
The East Slavic Folktale Catalogue lists a single variant from Belarus, in the work of ethnographer Michał Federowski. Federowski collected the tale from an informant named Taciana Pýtliczanka in Slonim District, which starts with the episode of the heroine masquerading as a man and going to the witch ("Девушка, попав к ведьме, выдает себя за мужчину"). In this tale, titled Ab wiedżmi jak syna żänila (Belarusian: "Аб ведзьме, як сына жаніла"; English: "About a witch who married her son"), a man plants too much wheat and has to carry them on a cart, but has no one to do it for him, so he dresses his daughter in male garments and sends her on the way. On the road, the girl is riding the cart, when the cart breaks down and she finds herself lost in a three-way crossroads. She sights a house in the distance, which she does not know belongs to a witch, and guides her horse there. The witch welcomes the girl, whom she suspects is a female under the male clothes, but the witch's son states they are male. Thus, both he and his mother devise ways to unmask her gender. A little dog that accompanied the girl rushes to warn her that they are trying to discover her, since the witch wants to marry her son to the guest. At the market, the girl pays no heed to women's products (dresses, beads), and sets her sights on male products. The witch's son is satisfied with the outcome and convinced that they are male. However, the witch kills the little dog for its meddling, and the girl does indeed reveal her gender. The witch marries her to her son. The witch then begins to hound her new daughter-in-law: first, she orders her to milk their cows. The girl takes the milk pail and cries, when her husband appears and explains the task for her: she gives her a piglet, which she is to throw in the forest to draw the wolves, let them eat the piglet as their bait, she is to milk them, and go back home, for the animals will not devour her. It happens thus, and the girl delivers the milk to the witch. Next, she orders the girl to fetch some wool, giving her a pair of scissors ("ножны", in the original). Her husband intercepts her again: he gives her a child, which she is to put on a bed and let the child cry to attract the devils, from which she is to pluck some hairs. It happens thus, and the witch gets her "wool". Thirdly, the witch orders her to go to the witch's sister fetch a "нічальніцы" (a kind of weaving mechanism). The girl does not know where to go, when her husband intercepts again and advises her how to proceed: he gives her a ball of thread which she is to throw and follow, some wheat for geese on the road, some cheese for the cats, some bread for the dogs, some butter to grease some doors; when at his aunt's house, she is to hold her left cheek before taking a bite of the food is offered her, then spit it out when the aunt asks her to return the food. The girl follows his instructions to the letter, gets the "нічальніцы" and rushes back, the witch's sister commanding her servants (the doors, the dog, the cat and the geese to stop her), but they stay their hand due to the girl's kind actions. Lastly, the witch orders the girl to invite the witch's family to the wedding. The girl is also at a loss at what to do, when her husband appears to her: he gives her a horse's head and tells her to stand under a fountain; the devils will come out of the fountain and fly to the witch's house, when the last devil will strike the horse's head, thinking it is the girl's. The girl takes the horse's head and does as her husband instructed: the devils come to the witch's house, and the girl follows behind them. The girl enters the house and finds the witch at the table with the devils. The witch looks at her daughter-in-law and laughs until she bursts. The devils then all leave via the chimney. The girl and the witch's son marry.

== See also ==
- Ileana Simziana
- The Tale About Baba-Yaga
- Vasilisa the Priest's Daughter
- The Man and the Girl at the Underground Mansion
- Prunella (AaTh 428)
- The Little Girl Sold with the Pears (AaTh 428)
- The Magic Swan Geese
