= The Enchanted Canary =

French fairy tale

"The Enchanted Canary" is a French fairy tale collected by Charles Deulin in Contes du roi Cambrinus (1874) under the title of Désiré d'Amour. Andrew Lang included it in The Red Fairy Book. It is classified as tale type ATU 408, "The Love for Three Oranges", of the international Aarne-Thompson-Uther Index. As with The Three Oranges, the tale deals with a prince's search for a bride that lives inside a fruit, who is replaced by a false bride and goes through a cycle of incarnations, until she regains physical form again.

== Synopsis ==
A lord was the fattest lord in Flanders. He loved his son dearly. One day, the young man told him he did not find the women in Flanders beautiful; he did not wish to marry a woman who was pink and white, because he did not find them beautiful. Then, they received a basket of oranges, which they had never seen before, and ate them. The son dreamed of an orchard with trees of such "golden apples", which held a princess with golden skin. He set out to find it and marry her.

At night, he stopped at a little hut. There, an old man told him that in a nearby forest was a park, which held a castle, and the orange grove behind it. A witch lived in the castle. He should oil the hinges, feed the dog a loaf of bread, give a baking woman a brush, and take the cord out of a well. Then he should get three oranges and return without touching the oranges until he reached water. Then, each one would be a princess and he could marry whichever one he loved. But having made his choice, he must never leave her.

He obeyed. He heard the witch calling after him, to the things to kill him, but the rope refused because he had kept it from rotting, and so on with the others. But once he escaped, he could not find water, and he opened an orange in hopes of juice. A canary flew out and flew off to find water. Despite himself, he tried a second, and the same thing happened; he fell unconscious. Nighttime revived him, and he reached a stream. There he opened the third, and when the third canary flew out, he gave it water. It became a beautiful princess.

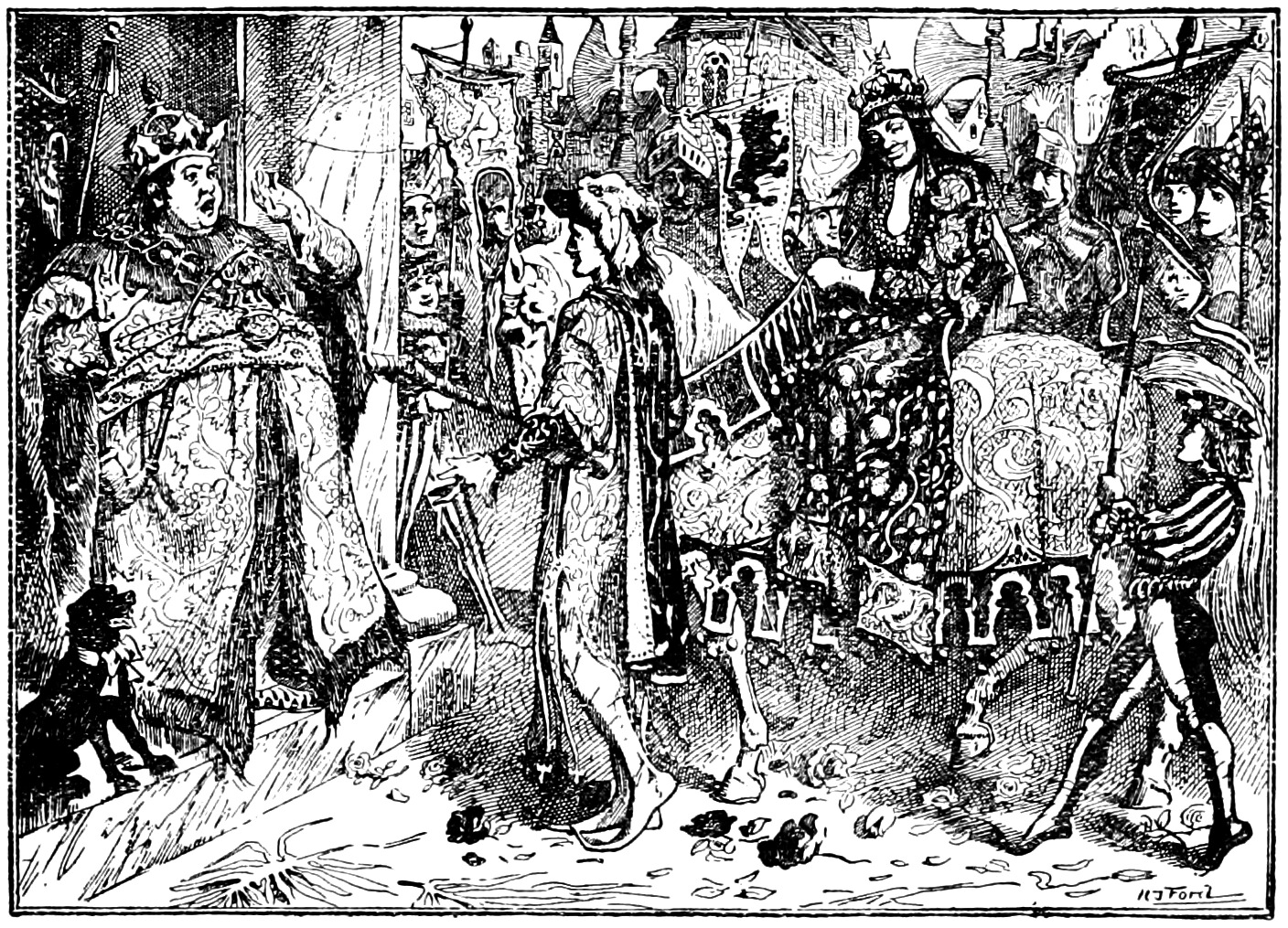
The prince brings the false bride home with him. Illustration by Henry Justice Ford for The Red Fairy Book.

He brought her back, but refused to take her to the castle afoot. He went ahead to get a carriage and horses. She heard a noise while he was gone and climbed a tree for fear it was a wolf. It was an ugly maidservant who saw the princess' reflection in the pool and took it for her own. She thought she was too beautiful to carry water. She was sent back twice, and the third time, she realized that the reflection was someone else. She spoke to the princess and heard her story. Sticking a pin into her head, the maidservant turned the princess back into a canary. She then told the young man, when he returned, that she had been turned into this. The young man blamed himself.

At the wedding feast, the canary appeared in the kitchen window and enchanted the person cooking the goose, three times, so that each time it burned. The third time, the scullion caught it, and was going to wring its neck, when the lord came down to see what had happened. The lord thought the canary lovely and stroked it, which made him find the pin. He pulled it out, and the princess was unenchanted. The maidservant was condemned to death, but the princess obtained her pardon, and she went back to work as a maidservant. The princess and the young man married.

== Analysis ==
=== Tale type ===
The tale is classified in the international Aarne-Thompson-Uther Index as tale type ATU 408, "The Three Oranges". In an article in Enzyklopädie des Märchens, scholar Christine Shojaei Kawan separated the tale type into six sections, and stated that parts 3 to 5 represented the "core" of the story:

- (1) A prince is cursed by an old woman to seek the fruit princess;
- (2) The prince finds helpers that guide him to the princess's location;
- (3) The prince finds the fruits (usually three), releases the maidens inside, but only the third survives;
- (4) The prince leaves the princess up a tree near a spring or stream, and a slave or servant sees the princess's reflection in the water;
- (5) The slave or servant replaces the princess (transformation sequence);
- (6) The fruit princess and the prince reunite, and the false bride is punished.

=== Motifs ===
==== The maiden's appearance ====
According to the tale description in the international index, the maiden may appear out of the titular citrus fruits, like oranges and lemons. However, she may also come out of pomegranates or other species of fruits, and even eggs. Likewise, Serbian scholarship notices that the heroine can come out of apples or eggs, but "in most tales" she appears from lemons and oranges. According to Walter Anderson's unpublished manuscript, variants with eggs instead of fruits appear in Southeastern Europe. In addition, Christine Shojaei-Kawan located the motif of the heroine emerging from the eggs in Slavic texts.

==== The transformations and the false bride ====
The tale type is characterized by the substitution of the fairy wife for a false bride. The usual occurrence is when the false bride (a witch or a slave) sticks a magical pin into the maiden's head or hair and she becomes a dove. (Note: "The motif of a woman stabbed in her head with a pin occurs in AT 403 (in India) and in AT 408 (in the Middle East and southern Europe).") In some tales, the fruit maiden regains her human form and must bribe the false bride for three nights with her beloved.

In other variants, the maiden goes through a series of transformations after her liberation from the fruit and regains a physical body. (Note: As Hungarian-American scholar Linda Dégh put it, "(...) the Orange Maiden (AaTh 408) becomes a princess. She is killed repeatedly by the substitute wife's mother, but returns as a tree, a pot cover, a rosemary, or a dove, from which shape she seven times regains her human shape, as beautiful as she ever was".) In that regard, according to Christine Shojaei-Kawan's article, Christine Goldberg divided the tale type into two forms. In the first subtype, indexed as AaTh 408A, the fruit maiden suffers the cycle of metamorphosis (fish-tree-human) - a motif Goldberg locates "from the Middle East to Italy and France" (especifically, it appears in Greece and Eastern Europe). In the second subtype, AaTh 408B, the girl is transformed into a dove by the needle.

Separated from her husband, she goes to the palace (alone or with other maidens) to tell tales to the king. She shares her story with the audience and is recognized by him.

== See also ==
- Lovely Ilonka
- Nix Nought Nothing
- Prunella
- The Lassie and Her Godmother
- The Little Girl Sold with the Pears
- The Love for Three Oranges
- The Magic Swan Geese
- The Two Caskets
- The Water of Life
- The Witch
