= The Magic Swan Geese =

Russian fairy tale

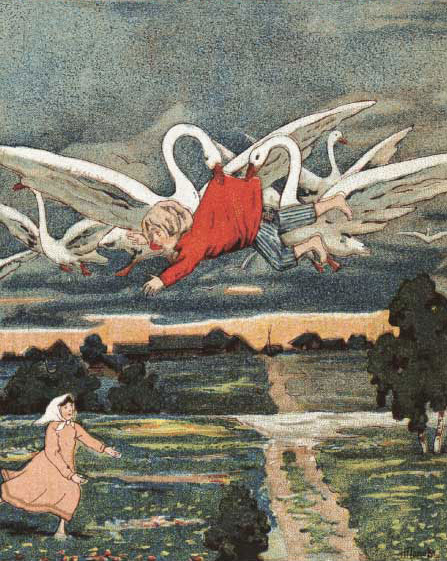
The Magic Swan Geese

The Magic Swan Geese (Russian: Гуси-лебеди, romanized: Gusi-lebedi) is a Russian fairy tale collected by Alexander Afanasyev in Narodnye russkie skazki, numbered 113.

It is classified in the Aarne–Thompson–Uther Index as tale type ATU 480A*.

== Synopsis ==
Once there was a couple who had both a daughter and a son. They left their daughter in charge of her younger brother, but one day she lost track of him and the magic swan geese snatched him away. The daughter chased after him and came upon an oven that offered to tell her if she ate its rye buns; she scorned them, saying she didn't even eat wheat buns. She also scorned similar offers from an apple tree, and a river of milk. She came across a little hut built on a hen's foot, in which she found Baba Yaga with her brother; Baba Yaga sent her to spin flax and left. A mouse scurried out and said it would tell her what she needed to know if she gave it porridge; she did, and it told her that Baba Yaga was heating the bath house to steam her, then she would cook her. The mouse took over her spinning, and the girl took her brother and fled.

Baba Yaga sent the swan geese after her. She begged the river for aid, and it insisted she drink some of it first; she did, and it sheltered her. When she ran on, the swan geese followed again, and the same happened with the apple tree and the oven. Then she reached home safely.

== Translations ==
A more literal translation of the tale's title is The Swan-Geese. Bernard Isaacs translated the tale as Little Girl and Swan-Geese, while Bonnie Marshall Carey translated it as Baba Yaga's Geese.

== Analysis ==
=== Tale type ===
The tale is classified in the Aarne–Thompson–Uther Index as type ATU 480A*, "Three Sisters Set Out to Save Their Little Brother".

German scholar Hans-Jörg Uther, in his 2004 revision of the ATU index, reported variants from Latvia, Lithuania, Russia, Belarus, Ukraine, and among the Mari/Cheremis and Wotian/Syrjanien peoples. Jack Haney stated that type 480A* seemed to appear "very rarely" outside the area of the East Slavic languages.

=== Variants ===
==== East Slavic ====
The story is classified in the East Slavic Folktale Classification (Russian: СУС, romanized: SUS), last updated by scholar Lev Barag in 1979, as type SUS 480A*, "Russian: Сестра (три сестры) отправляется спасать своего брата, romanized: Sestra (tri sestry) otpravlyaetsya spasat svoego brata, lit. 'Sister (Three Sisters) goes to rescue her brother'". According to the catalogue, the type is reported in Russia, Ukraine and Belarus.

===== Russia =====
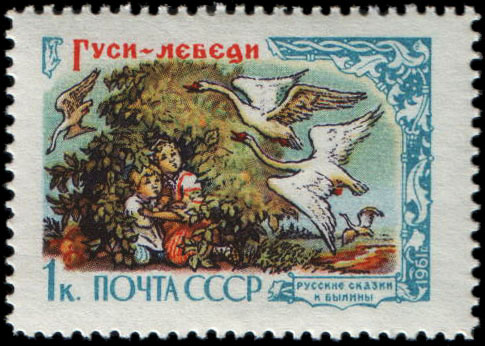
On a 1961 stamp

The oldest attestation of the tale type in Russia appears in a late-18th century publication, with the tale "Сказка о Сизом Орле и мальчике" ("The Fairy Tale about the Blue Eagle and the Boy").

==== Lithuania ====
Lithuanian folklorist Jonas Balys (lt), in his analysis of Lithuanian folktales (published in 1936), previously classified the Lithuanian variants as *314C (a type not indexed at the international classification, at the time), Trys seserys gelbsti raganos pavogtą broliuką.

According to Stith Thompson's reworked folktale classification (published in 1961), tale type AaTh 480A* registered 30 variants in Lithuania.

==== Latvian ====
A similar story is found in Latvia, also classified as type AaTh 480A*, Bārenīte pie raganas ("The Orphan in the Witch's House"): the heroine's little brother is taken by the witch to her lair. The heroine's sisters try to get him back, and fail. The heroine herself is kind to objects on her way to the witch, rescues her little brother and the objects protect her when the witch goes after her.

==== Estonia ====
The tale type ATU 480A* is also reported in Estonia, with the title Kured viivad venna ära ("The Cranes Take the Brother Away"). In the Estonian variants, the heroine's little brother is taken away by cranes or geese.

==== Mari people ====
Scholar S. S. Sabitov located a similar narrative in the "Catalogue of Tales of Magic from the Mari people", indexed as type 480A*, "Сестра отправляется спасать своего брата" ("Sister races to save her brother)": the heroine treats objects and trees with respect, which protect her when she escapes with her brother from the witch Vuver-kuva and her geese.

== Adaptations ==
1949, "Soyuzmultfilm": a 20-minute animated film "Гуси-лебеди" by the directors Ivan Ivanov-Vano and Aleksandra Snezhko-Blotskaya. It was repeatedly published on VHS and DVD in collections of the Soviet animated films.

== See also ==
- Labyrinth
- Prunella
- The Enchanted Canary
- The King of Love
- The Little Girl Sold with the Pears
- The Old Witch
- The Witch
- Hansel and Gretel
- Diamonds and Toads
- Frau Holle
- Ivasyk-Telesyk
- The Girl as Soldier
