= Belle-Belle ou Le Chevalier Fortuné =

French literary fairy tale written by Madame d'Aulnoy

The Story of Fortunia
- Author: Madame d'Aulnoy
- Original title: Belle-Belle ou Le Chevalier Fortuné
- Language: French
- Genre: Literary fairy tale

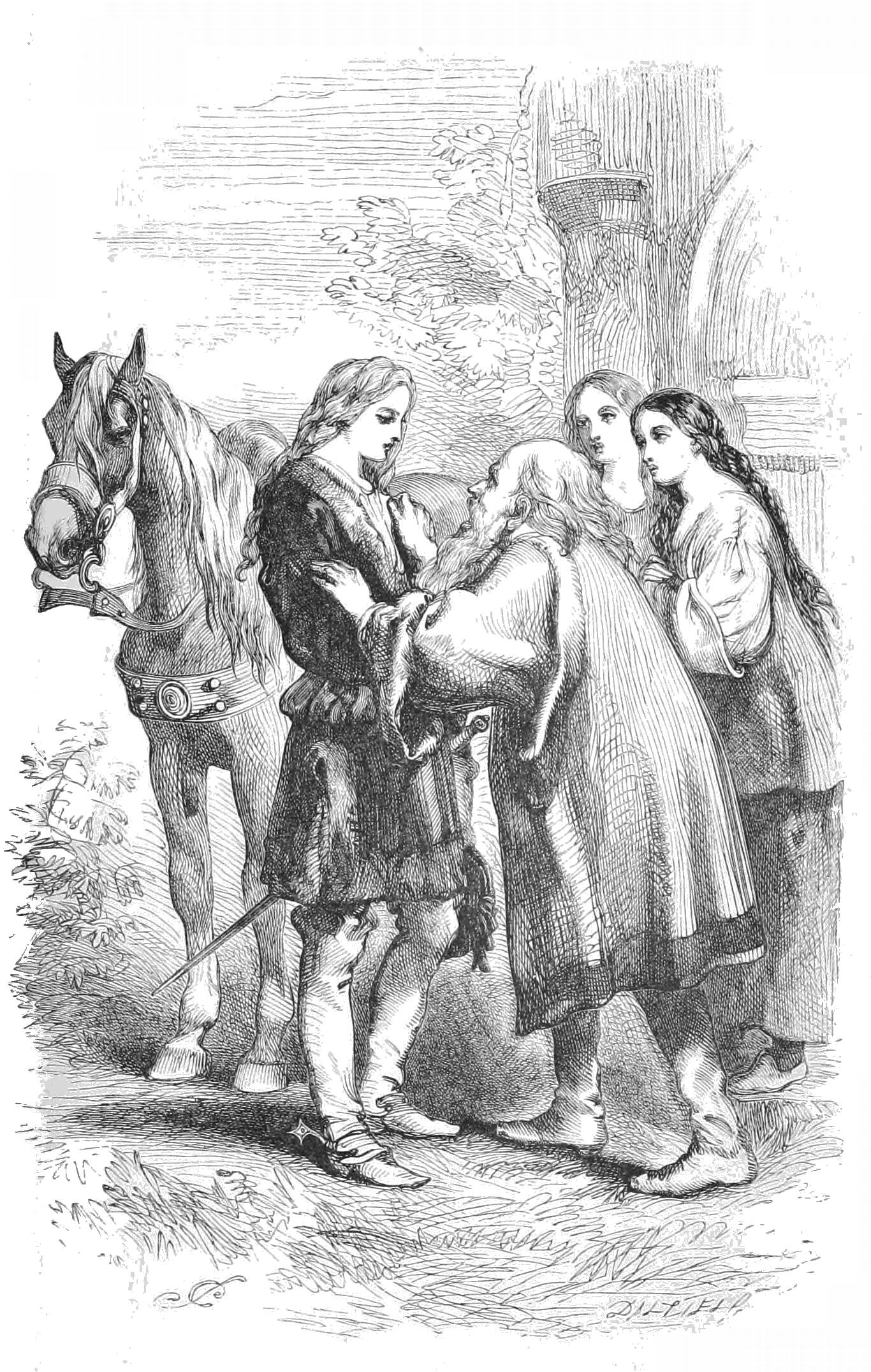
Illustration of Belle-belle by Sir John Gilbert

Belle-Belle ou Le Chevalier Fortuné is a French literary fairy tale, written by Madame d'Aulnoy.

It is a story about a female wartime cross-dressers. In the story, a king forms an army for his war against an emperor. He demands a soldier from each noble household. An elderly nobleman is too old to serve in the army, so his three daughters offer to serve in his place. The first two fail to convincingly pass as men, but Belle-Belle the youngest daughter acquires magical help from a fairy shepherdess. Posing as a knight, Belle-Belle is the object of unrequited love for a queen. When Belle-Belle reveals that she is a woman to escape criminal charges, she is married to the king.

== Plot summary ==
A king, driven from his capital by an emperor, was forming an army and demanded that one person from every noble household become a soldier or face a heavy fine. An impoverished nobleman was distressed by this news. He was too old to serve himself, and had three daughters and no sons. His oldest daughter offered to go and was equipped. She told a shepherdess whose sheep were in the ditch, that she pitied her. The shepherdess thanked the daughter, calling her a "beautiful girl." Ashamed that she could be recognized so easily, the oldest daughter went home. The second daughter also set out. She scorned the shepherdess for her folly, but the shepherdess bid farewell to the "lovely girl." The second daughter also returned home.

The youngest, Belle-Belle, set out. She helped the shepherdess. The shepherdess, a fairy, told her that she had punished her sisters for their lack of helpfulness and stopped them from their mission. She gave Belle-Belle a new horse and equipment, including a magical chest that would appear and disappear. The horse would be able to advise her. The fairy told the girl to call herself Fortuné.

The youngest daughter, now called Fortune, set out and reached a city. There she wanted to send gold back from the chest, but when she discovered that she had lost the key, the horse told her how to open the chest. She sent back gold and jewels, but as soon as her sisters touched some, the jewels became glass and the gold turned into counterfeit coins; they told their father to keep the rest safe.

Fortuné went to join the king. At the horse's advice, she met a woodcutter who cut down an enormous number of trees, and took him into her service. Then she did the same with a man who tied up one foot to hunt, so there would be some chance of his prey escaping, then a man who put a bandage over his eyes so that he would not shoot everything, a man who could hear everything on the earth, a man who blew hard enough to move windmills (and if he stood too close, knock them over), a man who could drink a lake, and a man who could eat an enormous amount of bread. She asked them to keep their abilities secret.

Fortune met the king and queen-dowager, his sister-in-law, who made her welcome. The queen found the knight attractive, and Fortuné found the king attractive. Many ladies also paid her attentions, greatly to her embarrassment. A lady-in-waiting, Florida, whom the queen sent to woo the knight on her behalf, was so in love with Fortuné that she defamed the queen instead. The queen managed to question Fortuné and learn that "he" was not in love, though he sang love songs after the custom of the land, but eventually grew so displeased with his refusal that when news of a dragon came, she told the king that Fortuné had begged leave to be dispatched against it.

When the king summoned him, rather than denounce the queen, Fortuné went. The man with the super hearing, heard the dragon coming. At the horse's advice, he had the drinker drink a lake, the strong woodcutter fill it with wine and spices that would make the dragon thirsty, and had all the peasants hide in their houses. The dragon drank and grew drunk. Fortuné attacked and killed it. The king was pleased, but the queen was still displeased with Fortuné. She told the king that he had said he could win back the treasure that the emperor had taken, without any army.

Fortuné went with his men, and the emperor said he could have back the treasure only if one man could eat up all the fresh bread in the city. The glutton ate it all. The emperor added that one man must drain all the fountains, reservoirs, and aqueducts, and all the wine-cellars. The drinker did so. The emperor's daughter suggested a race against her, and shared with the fleet-footed hunter the cordial she used, but it put him to sleep. The man who could hear heard him snoring; the sharp-eyed man shot and waked him, and he won the race. The emperor said he could carry away only what one man could carry, and the strong woodcutter carried off everything he owned. They came to a river while they were leaving, the drinker drank it so they could pass. The emperor sent men after them, but the man who powered windmills sank their boats. The servants began to quarrel over their reward, but Fortuné declared that the king would decide their reward, and they submitted themselves to him. The king was pleased.

The queen made an open declaration to Fortuné. When Fortuné refused her, she attacked him and herself and called for help, saying that he had attacked her and her injuries stemmed from her resistance. Fortuné was sentenced to be stabbed to death, but taking off the clothing revealed that she was a woman. The king married her.

== Motifs ==
This story type is found in the older works of Costanza / Costanzo, by Giovanni Francesco Straparola, and The Three Crowns by Giambattista Basile. This story shows more influence from Straparola.

The woman disguised as a man is found in folk and fairy tales as well, such as Vasilisa the Priest's Daughter or The Lute Player.

The motif of talented servants is classified as Aarne–Thompson–Uther ATU 513, "How Six Made Their Way Into The World" and is commonly found in folk and fairy tales, such as How Six Made Their Way in the World, The Six Servants, Long, Broad and Sharpsight, The Fool of the World and the Flying Ship, How the Hermit Helped to Win the King's Daughter, The Clever Little Tailor and one of the stories in Baron Munchausen.

== Legacy ==
When translated into English, the tale was renamed The Story of Fortunio or Fortunio, by Laura Valentine, in The Old, Old Fairy Tales.

The tale was one of many from d'Aulnoy's pen to be adapted to the stage by James Planché, as part of his Fairy Extravaganza. He also renamed the tale Fortunio, and His Seven Gifted Servants when he adapted the tale to the stage.

== See also ==
- Works related to Belle Belle; or, the Chevalier Fortuné at Wikisource
- Ileana Simziana (Romanian fairy tale)
