= Vasilisa the Priest's Daughter =

Russian fairy tale

Vasilisa the Priest's Daughter (Afanasyev 131–133) is a Russian fairy tale collected by Aleksandr Afanasyev in Narodnye russkie skazki.

== Synopsis ==
A daughter of a priest wore men's clothing, rode horses, and could fire a gun. One day, the king saw this "young man". But his servants insisted that the "young man" was, in fact, a girl. The king did not believe the servants; he wrote to the priest asking him if his "son" could have dinner with him. The priest sent his daughter to the king’s home. Before she arrived, the king sought advice from a witch regarding the true identity of the "young man". The witch advised the king to do many different things to test if Vasilisa is a girl or not, such as place an embroidery frame and a gun positioned on a wall and to see which object she will notice first. If she is a girl she will notice the frame first, and vice versa. The "young man" passed every test, but the king remained doubtful. The king tries several times to find the true identity, but on the last time the king asked the "young man" to take a bath with him, and the "young man" agreed. While the king undressed, the "young man" undressed, bathed quickly and fled, leaving a note for the king saying

"Ah King Barkhat, raven that you are, you could not surprise the falcon in the garden! For I am not Vasily Vasilyevich, but Vasilisa Vasilyevna" (Afanas’ev 133).

== Motifs ==
The woman disguised as a man is found in other fairy tales, such as Belle-Belle ou Le Chevalier Fortuné, by Madame d'Aulnoy, Costanza / Costanzo, by Giovanni Francesco Straparola, The Three Crowns by Giambattista Basile and Fanta-Ghiro the Beautiful, by Italo Calvino.

== See also ==
- Folklore of Russia
- The Horse Lurja
- Ileana Simziana
- The Girl as Soldier
