= The Dog in the Sea =

Northern European fairy tale

Folk tale
- Name: The Dog in the Sea
- Also known as: The Dog and the Sailor
- Aarne–Thompson grouping: 540
- Country: Denmark, Sweden, Finland, Germany, Netherlands

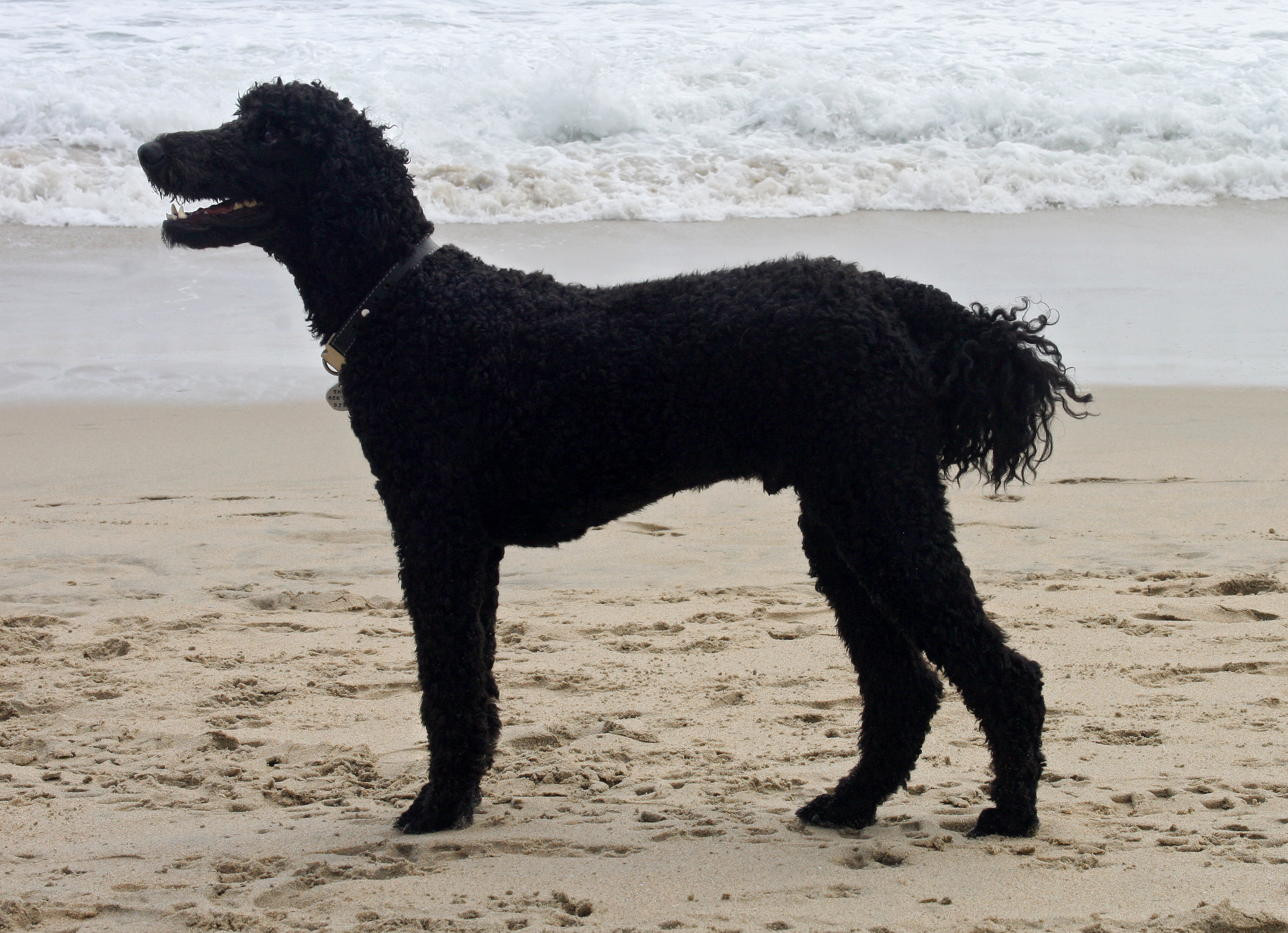
A black poodle on a beach, similar to the one in Kamp's version of a story

The Dog in the Sea, also known as The Dog and the Sailor, is a northern European fairy tale classified as ATU 540, "The Dog in the Sea".

== Description ==
The common plot thread in all variants collected by German scholar Hans-Jörg Uther begins with an unhappy sailor trying to commit suicide by drowning, and meeting a talking dog that offers him help instead. The sailor and his supernatural companion sail together, and after three heavy storms the dog tells the sailor to jump into the water. Underwater the sailor finds a castle and a beautiful woman with magical powers. Warned by the dog, the sailor kills the woman and accomplishes three challenging tasks through three nights in the castle. Afterwards he cuts the dog's head off, and the dog is revealed to be a handsome prince, once enchanted by his mother-in-law/father/a witch, and now returned to human form.

== Variants ==
Variants of the tale exist in Danish, Finnish, Frisian, German and Dutch languages and have been transcribed by Nikolaj Christian Christensen, Oskar Hackman, Jens Kamp, Jurjen van der Kooi and Pirkko-Liisa Rausmaa. All of them have been collected from late 19th to 20th century. In his work, Nikolay Petrovich Andreyev claimed that type 540 existed in Russian language, but did not provide an example.

Kamp's version from Denmark, David Husmandssøn, is the longest and the most detailed of the above. It introduces the character of overprotective mother who wants her son to take up a "gentle trade", and the son purposefully makes mistakes in those apprenticeships until he is allowed to work at sea. Furthermore, the supernatural dog is stated to be a black poodle, a breed historically used as a water dog. The sailor at the end is offered "half the kingdom" by the prince's father, but rejects the offer and returns home to care for his parents.

In both Christensen and Kamp versions, not only the prince is released from the curse, but also his father, who has been turned into a lion and is held prisoner in chains in the castle, whose head and tail have to be cut off and attached vice versa again, or whose animal skin is to be cut open with a knife. In the Swedish version (Hackman), which, like the Finnish version, is only slightly related to the Danish version, the enchanted dog is not a human but a troll prince. In the Finnish version of Rausmaa, the dog disenchants itself by jumping into the water, while the second Finnish variant differs even more in its content.

== Analysis ==
This fairy tale type has been included in Enzyklopädie des Märchens.

It has been analyzed from a queer theory perspective, with a protagonist that could be considered gay, asexual or otherwise queer.

== In popular culture ==
This folktale was not added to the Motif-Index of Folk-Literature compiled by Stith Thompson, a guide that is still used worldwide today to organize and analyze folktales. According to Pete Jordi Wood, Thompson held a negative view towards the LGBTQ community and chose to not incorporate many positive stories with LGBTQ themes. Thompson did incorporate tales with queer characters who were harmed or depicted as a villain. This motivated Woods to retell this story. An illustrated retelling of the story was published by Wood.

== See also ==
- Ileana Simziana, another fairy tale interpreted as having a queer subtext
- Pete Jordi Wood’s anthology “Tales From Beyond the Rainbow: 10 LGBTQ+ Fairy Tales Proudly Reclaimed” (Puffin Classics, 2023) highlights ten international, historically grounded folk tales featuring positive portrayals of LGBTQ+ protagonists.
