= British mythology =

British mythology might refer to:

- English mythology
- North Irish mythology
- Scottish mythology
- Welsh mythology

== See also ==
- British folklore
