= The Three Crowns =

The Three Crowns is an Italian literary fairy tale written by Giambattista Basile in his 1634 work, the Pentamerone.

== Synopsis ==
A childless king heard a voice asking him whether he would rather have a daughter who would flee him or a son who would destroy him. After consulting his wise men, who argued over whether the danger to life or honor was the worse, he concluded that the daughter would be less harmful to his realm; he went back to the garden and answered the voice that he wanted the daughter. She was born, and her father tried to shelter her in a castle, but when she was fifteen, he concluded a marriage for her. When she left to go to her husband, a whirlwind carried her off.

The wind left her at an ogress's house in the forest. An old woman there warned her of the danger, saying the ogress did not eat her only because she needed a servant and the old woman was old and tough; she gave the princess the keys, to go inside and clean the house perfectly, which was her only chance. The princess, Marchetta, cleaned the house. When the ogress returned, the old woman hid Marchetta and claimed the credit. When the ogress left again, the old woman fed Marchetta and told her to prepare a very fine dinner to charm her, warning her that if the ogress swore by all the seven heavens, she was not to be trusted; only her oath by her three crowns was trustworthy. The ogress praised the dinner and made many fine oaths about what she would do for the cook, but only when she swore by her three crowns did Marchetta come out. The ogress said that Marchetta had outsmarted her and could live in the castle as if it were her own; she gave her the keys and warned her against opening one doorway. One day Marchetta opened it and found three women dressed in gold, sitting on thrones, asleep; these were the ogress's daughters, whom she kept there because they would be in danger if not woken by a king's daughter. They woke, Marchetta fed them each an egg, and the ogress returned. Angry, she slapped Marchetta; then she tried to appease her, but Marchetta insisted on leaving. The ogress gave her a suit of men's clothes and a magic ring, which she should wear with the stone turned inside. If she were ever in great danger, and heard the ogress's name like an echo, she should look at the stone, but not until then.

Marchetta went to the king and, claiming to be a merchant's son driven out by his wicked stepmother's cruelty, took service as a page. The queen, believing her to be male, desired her as a lover and propositioned her. Marchetta, not wishing to reveal that she was a woman, said that she could not believe that the queen would cuckold the king. The queen told the king that the page had tried to seduce her. The king immediately condemned Marchetta to death. Marchetta lamented her fate and asked who would help her; the echo said, "The ogress"; Marchetta remembered the stone and looked at it. A voice proclaimed that she was a woman, shocking her guards. The king demanded her story, and Marchetta gave it. The king had his wife thrown into the sea, invited Marchetta's parents to his court, and married her.

== Variants ==
The woman who disguises herself as a man is also found in Giovanni Francesco Straparola's Costanza / Costanzo; his variant is later but appears to be more derived from the folk tradition. A later French variant, Belle-Belle ou Le Chevalier Fortuné by Madame d'Aulnoy, touches on the same theme, but shows more influence from Straparola.

The motif of "a woman who successfully disguises herself as a man and then is accused of seduction" is documented in writing even earlier than Straparola. The Golden Legend, a collection of hagiographies first compiled around 1260, has several stories of female saints who dress themselves as monks and are accused of seduction or rape.

The woman disguised as a man is found in folk fairy tales as well, such as Vasilisa The Priest’s Daughter and The Lute Player.
