= Costanza / Costanzo =

Italian fairy tale written by Giovanni Francesco Straparola

Costanza / Costanzo is an Italian literary fairy tale written by Giovanni Francesco Straparola in The Facetious Nights of Straparola (written between 1550 and 1555).

== Synopsis ==
A king married to have heirs, and his wife bore three daughters. In time, he realized that his wife had come to an age where she would have no more children, and his three daughters were ready for marriage. He married them off and split his kingdom between them, keeping only enough land to support his court.

A few years later, the queen gave birth to a fourth daughter, Costanza. Costanza was raised well and became a gracious, educated and accomplished princess. When she was old enough to marry, they proposed that she marry the son of a marquis, because her dowry would not be enough for a match equal to her birth. Costanza refused to marry below her station, dressed as a man, and left, calling herself Costanzo.

She entered a king's service, where the queen desired her as a lover, but "Costanzo" rejected her. The king had long wished to have as a captive one of the satyrs that did great damage in his land; the queen suggested to him that so good a servant as Costanzo could catch one. The king proposed it to Costanzo, who agreed to please him. She asked for a large vessel, wine, and bread. In the woods, she filled the vessel with the wine and bread and climbed a tree. The satyrs smelled it, ate the bread, and fell asleep. Costanza tied up one and carried him off. On the way back, the satyr woke and began to laugh: at a funeral of a child, at a hanging, at a crowd that hailed her as "Costanzo", and at being presented to the king.

The king tried to make the satyr talk. The queen said that Costanzo could certainly make it talk. Costanzo tried to bribe it with food, then threatened it with hunger, and finally promised to free it. It ate and talked. It told that at the funeral, the apparent father was not the father, but the priest was; at the hanging, the crowd was filled with officials who pilfered far more money than the thief to be hanged; and that it would explain the rest the next day. The next day, it explained that they were hailing her by the wrong name, and that the king was deluded into believing his wife's maidens were women, when they were disguised men. The king had his queen and her disguised lovers burned, and married Costanza.

== Variants ==
The woman who disguises herself as a man is also found in Giambattista Basile's The Three Crowns. A later French variant, Belle-Belle ou Le Chevalier Fortuné by Madame d'Aulnoy, shows more influence from Straparola.

The woman disguised as a man is found in folk fairy tales as well, such as Vasilisa The Priest’s Daughter.
