= Prunella (fairy tale) =

Italian fairy tale

"Prunella" is an Italian fairy tale, originally known as Prezzemolina. Andrew Lang included it in The Grey Fairy Book. It is Aarne-Thompson type 310, the Maiden in the Tower.

Italo Calvino noted that variants were found over all of Italy. The captor who demands his captive perform impossible tasks, and the person, usually the captor's child, who helps with them, is a very common fairy tale theme—Nix Nought Nothing, The Battle of the Birds, The Grateful Prince, or The Master Maid—but this tale unusually makes the captive a girl and the person the captor's son.

== Synopsis ==
=== Prunella ===
A girl goes to school, and every day, she picks a plum from a tree along the way. She is called "Prunella" because of this. But the tree belongs to a wicked witch and one day she catches the girl. Prunella grows up as her captive.

One day, the witch sends her with a basket to the well, with orders to bring it back filled with water. The water seeps out every time, and Prunella cries. A handsome young man asks her what her trouble is, and tells her that he is Bensiabel, the witch's son; if she kisses him, he will fill the basket. She refuses because he is a witch's son, but he fills the basket with water anyway. The witch then sets her to make bread from unmilled wheat while she is gone. Prunella, knowing it is impossible, tries for a time, and then cries. Bensiabel appears. She again refuses to kiss a witch's son, but he makes the bread for her.

Finally, the witch sends her over the mountains to get a casket from her sister, knowing her sister is an even more cruel witch, who will starve her to death. Bensiabel tells her and offers to save her if she kisses him; she refuses. He gives her oil, bread, rope, and a broom, and tells her to oil the gate's hinges at his aunt's house, give a fierce dog the bread, give the rope to a woman trying to lower the bucket into the well by her hair, and give the broom to a woman trying to clean the hearth with her tongue. Then she should take the casket from the cupboard and leave at once. She does this. As she leaves, the witch calls to all of them to kill her, but they refuse because of what Prunella had given them.

The witch becomes enraged when Prunella returns. She orders Prunella to tell her in the night which cock crows, whenever one does. Prunella still refuses to kiss Bensiabel, but he tells her each time the yellow and the black cock does. When the third one crows, Bensiabel hesitates because he still hopes to get Prunella to kiss him, and Prunella begs him to save her. He springs on the witch, and she falls down the stairs and dies. Prunella is touched by his goodness and agrees to marry him, and they live happily ever after.

=== Translations ===
The tale originally appeared as Prezzemolina in 1879, collected from Mantua by Isaia Visentini. The stolen plant was originally parsley (prezzemolo in Italian), as in Rapunzel, but Andrew Lang changed it to a plum and the heroine's name to Prunella. Lang did not name a source for the story.

Author Ruth Manning-Sanders adapted the tale in her work A Book of Witches, wherein the witch's son's name was given as "Benvenuto".

== Imbriani's La Prezzemolina ==
A version from Florence, Tuscany, was published in 1871 by Italian writer Vittorio Imbriani. Italo Calvino adapted it in his Italian Folktales.

=== Summary ===
Prezzemolina is captured not because of her own eating, but because of her mother's craving for, and theft of, fairies' parsley. The girl is seized when going to school, but after the fairies send her to tell her mother to pay what she owed, and the mother sends back that the fairies should take it.

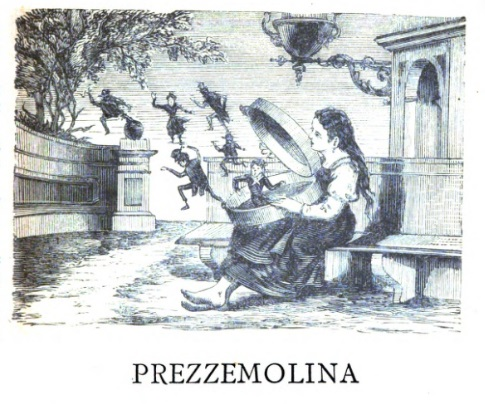
Prezzemolina opens the "scatola del Bel-Giullare" and releases the musicians. Uncredited illustration from a 1884 publication.

Memé, cousin of the fairies, helps Prezzemolina as Bensiabel does, despite her refusal of kisses. The fairies first order Prezzemolina to bleach the black walls of a room, then paint them with all birds of the air. Memé waves his magic wand and completes this task. Next, the fairies send Prezzemolina to collect a casket ("scatola del Bel-Giullare", in Imbriani's text; "Handsome Clown's box" in Calvino's; "Handsome Minstrel's box", in Zipes's) from the evil Morgan le Fay (Fata Morgana). Prezzemolina goes to Fata Morgana and meets four old women on the way (in Imbriani's text): the first gives her a pot of grease to use on two creeking doors; the second gives her loaves of bread to feed her guard dogs; the third a sewing thread to be given to a cobbler; and the fourth a rag to be given to a baker who is cleaning an oven with their hands. The last woman also advises her to enter Fata Morgana's castle and, while she is away, get the casket and run away as fast as possible. Fata Morgana commands the baker, the cobbler, the dogs and the doors to stop her, but, due to her kind actions, Prezzemolina escapes unscathed. Now at a distance, she opens the casket and a group of musicians escape from it. Memé appears and offers to close the box in exchange for a kiss. Prezzemolina declines, but Memé uses the magic wand to draw everyone back into the box. Prezzemolina then delivers the casket to the fairies. However, there was no test of identifying a rooster's crow.

In the end, Memé and Prezzemolina together destroy the evil fairies. First they trick and boil three fairy ladies in the garden house, and then enter a room where they blow out the magic candles that held the souls of all the others, including Morgan's. They then take all that had belonged to the fairies, marry, and live happily in Morgan's palace, where they are generous to the servants who had not attacked her.

=== Analysis ===
Imbriani, commenting on the tale, noted its initial resemblance to the tale L'Orca, from the Pentamerone, but remarked that the second part of the story was close to The Golden Root. French comparativist Emmanuel Cosquin noted that Imbriani's Tuscan tale (Prezzemolina) contained the motif of a fairy antagonist imposing tasks on the heroine - akin to Psyche of her namesake myth -, also comparing it to Italian The Golden Root.

Calvino's tale (numbered 86 in his collection) was listed by Italian scholars Alberto Maria Cirese and Liliana Serafini under type AaTh 428, Il Lupo ("The Wolf") (see below).

== Laboulaye's Fragolette ==
French author Édouard René de Laboulaye published a retelling in which the plant was a strawberry, the heroine was renamed "Fragolette" (from the Italian fragola), and the hero was renamed Belèbon.

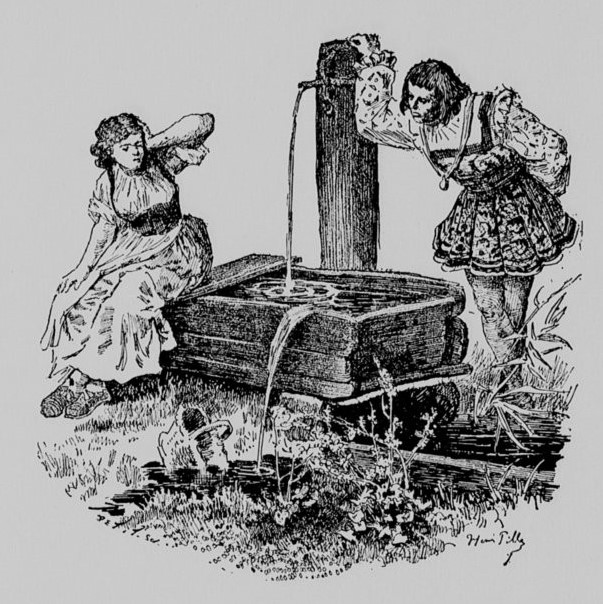
The witch's son, Belebon, draws water to fill Fragolette's basket. Illustration from Derniers Contes Bleus (1884).

In Laboulaye's tale, the action is set in Mantua. A little girl likes to pick up strawberries, and thus is nicknamed "Fragolette" ('little strawberry'). One day, she is picking up berries in the usual spot, when something strikes the back of her head. It is a witch, who takes the girl on her broom to her lair. Once there, the witch forces Fragolette to be her servant. One day, she asks the girl to take a basket to the well and fill it with water. Fragolette goes to the well to fulfill the task, but the basket cannot hold any drop of water. She begins to cry, until a soft voice inquires what is her problem; it belongs to the son of the witch, Belèbon. He asks for a kiss, but Fragolette refuses. At any rate, Belèbon breathes into the basket, fills it with water and gives it to Fragolette.

The next time, the witch tells Fragolette she will travel to Africa and gives the girl a sack of wheat; Fragolette is to use the wheat and bake some loaves of bread for her when she returns later that night. Belèbon helps her by summoning with a whistle an army of rats that grind the wheat into flour and bake enough bread to fill the room.

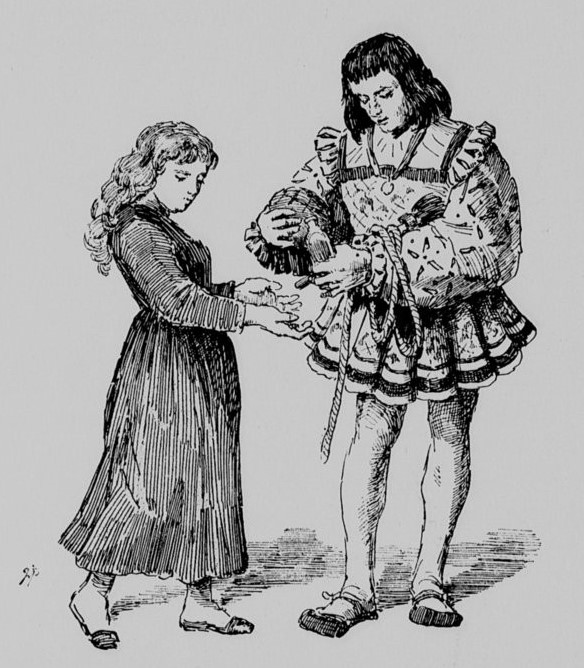
Belebon gives Fragolette items to clear the way to Viperine's house: an oil can, bread, a cord and a little broom. Illustration from Derniers contes Bleus (1884).

Later, the witch orders Fragolette to go to Viperine, the witch's sister, and get from her a strong-box. Belèbon appears to her and instructs her on how to proceed: he gives her an oil can, a bread, a cord, and a little broom. She will first cross a dirty stream, she is to compliment it for it to allow her passage. She then is to use the oil on the hinges of a door, throw the bread to a dog, give the cord to a woman next to a well in the courtyard to draw water, the little broom to a cook in the kitchen to clean the oven, enter Viperine's room, get the box and escape. Fragolette follows the instructions to the letter, but Viperine wakes up. The witch's sister commands the cook, the woman at the well, the dog, the door hinges and the stream to stop her, but Fragolette returns safely with the box.

Lastly, Fragolette is to identify between three cocks which is the one who crows. With Belèbon's help, she says it is the white one. The witch springs a trap: she jumps at the girl, but Fragolette escapes through the window, while the witch catches her foot in the window and falls, the fall breaking at once her two tusks, the source of her life and power.

After the witch dies, Fragolette is free, and Belèbon, in love with her, tries to propose to her. Some time later, she concedes, and they are happily married.

== Variants ==
=== Prezzemolina (Genova) ===
In a North Italian tale also titled Prezzemolina, a human couple live next to some ogresses. One day, the wife sees from her balcony some succulent parsley herbs (prezzemolo) she wants to eat. She creeps into the ogresses' garden, steals some herbs, and goes back home. When the ogresses return home, they notice their garden is ravaged, and set their youngest to watch over the garden. The next day, the young ogress catches the woman in the act, and brings her to her sister to decide his punishment. They strike a deal: the woman is to name her baby Prezzemolina ("Parsley") and give her to the ogresses. Years later, a baby girl is born and given the name Parsley. One day, she is met by the ogresses, who ask her to remind her mother of their deal. The ogresses shove the girl inside a sack and bring her to their lair. Intent on devouring her, the ogresses decide to have her as their servant, and postpone her death until she is old and plump enough. Time passes, and the girl busies herself with many household chores, like cooking and cleaning. When she goes to the well to fetch water, she hears someone wailing at the bottom of the well. She leans a bit to see who it is and finds a cat. She ropes the cat in a bucket, and the animal introduces itself as Gatto-Berlacco, and, whenever she needs any help, she just has to shout for him. Later, the ogresses decide to eat the girl, but first impose tasks on her, for, in case she fails, she will be devoured. The first task is for her go to the coal cellar and wash every black piece inside white. The girl cries over the impossibility of the task, and summons the cat. With a magic word, the cat fulfills the task for her. Next, the ogresses order her to go to the house of Maga Soffia-e-Risoffia, steal a cage with a bird named Biscotto-Binello, and get back before nine in the evening. The girl summons the cat again, who gives her some objects and advice on how to use them: she is to give a marble mortar and wooden pestle to a little witch making pesto, a Pasqualina pie to some guards, and use a pot of lard to oil the hinges of a door behind the guards. It happens as the cat describes. Prezzemolina opens the door, climbs up a staircase and fetches the bird. She passes by the guards and the witch, and goes back to the ogresses' lair. She stops before the cat, who becomes a human prince. He explains he was cursed by the ogresses into cat form, and shows Prezzemolina their captors, now marble statues. Italian writer Beatrice Solinas Donghi sourced the tale from Genova.

=== La Bella Parsembolina (Padova) ===
Professor Cesare Cimegotto collected a tale from Padua, Veneto, with the Venetian title La Bella Parsembolina, which Italian writer Dino Coltro published as La bella Prezzemolina ("Beautiful Prezzemolina"). In this tale, an old witch lives with her son Beniamino next to a human widow and her daughter. The girl, who is pregnant, wants to eat the prezzemolo from the witch's garden and steals some, until the witch discovers her and makes a pact for the girl to deliver her child after they are born. Time passes, and a baby girl is born, and given the name Prezzemolina. Despite her mother's best efforts, the witch captures her and takes her to her palace. The witch imposes hard tasks on her: first, to wash and iron a large quantity of linen. She cries over its difficulty, then the witch's son, Beniamino, offers to help her in exchange for a kiss. Prezzemolina refuses it, but the youth helps her anyway. Next, she is to make the bed in a way that it is possible to jump and dance on the bed without crumpling the sheets. Thirdly, the witch and her cohorts fill a casket with magic and order Prezzemolina to take it. Being curious, she opens it, and some creatures jump out of the box: in Cimegotto's text, a myriad of "folletti" (a type of imp or elf); in Coltro's text, the Massariol, Salbanei, Pesarol and Komparet - jump and dance around the box. Beniamino, who has followed Prezzemolina, locks the things back into the casket. Finally, the old witch decides to get rid of the girl by lighting a fire under a nut tree. Beniamino realizes his mother's trick and vows to free himself from her magic, so he plots with Prezzemolina: they approach the cauldron of boiling water and shove the witch inside. Free at last, Beniamino marries Prezzemolina. In his notes, Coltro remarked that the central action (heroine helped by the sorceress's son) also occurred in Basile's The Golden Root (Pentamerone, Day Five, Fourth Story).

=== La storia della Bella Persemolina (Verona) ===
In a Veronese tale first collected in 1891 from informant Caterina Marsilli with the title La storia della Bella Persemolina or La storia della bella Prezzemolina ("The tale of Beautiful Prezzemolina"), a pregnant woman lives next to an old ortolana woman, and steals parsley from the latter's garden to eat, until one day the ortolana discovers her. The woman promises to give the ortolana her first child, when she is born. Time passes, and a girl is born, given the name Bella Prezzemolina. Whenever she goes to school, she passes by the ortolana's house, who tells her to remind her mother of what was promised. The ortolana then kidnaps Prezzemolina and takes the girl to her castle as servant, imposing difficult tasks on her. First, the girl is to wash and iron all of her clothes while the ortolana is away. Prezzemolina cries a bit, until the ortolana's son, Bel Giulio (Giuglio, in the Veronese original), offers his help: he takes out a wand and with a magic command fulfills the task for her. Next, the ortolana orders the girl to clean the entire house, since her son is getting married. Bel Giulio uses the wand again to help her. Thirdly, the ortolana says she will place three roosters in the stables (a red, a black and a white one), and Prezzemolina has to guess which one will crow. Bel Giulio advises her to stay by the door to his room, where he will be with his wife, and he will whisper her the correct answer. The ortolana asks outside the room which cock crowed, but Prezzemolina keeps quiet. She enters the room and kills someone in their bed, then goes to sleep. The next day, she wakes up to make breakfast for her son and his wife, and sees Bel Giulio with Prezzemolina. Realizing she killed the wrong person, the ortolana kills herself. Bel Giulio lives happily ever after with Prezzemolina.

=== Prezzemolina (Castellina in Chianti) ===
In an Italian tale from Castellina in Chianti, from Sienese Chianti, titled Prezzemolina, a group of fairies beg for alms and find a little girl and her little mother. The fairies find the girl cute and convince the mother to give them the girl. The girl's mother agrees to their terms and gives the fairies her daughter. The fairies take the girl home with them and order her to prepare their food, their beds, clean the house "and everything", then leave. The little girl begins to cry, when a little man named Memè appears to her and asks what is the matter. The girl explains to Memè the fairies' orders, Memè leaves, then returns and promises to do her chores for her. The fairies return and see that everything has been done. The fairies then give the girl the same chores for days after, which she does with Memè's help. The fairies convene and admit they want to devour the girl, then decide to send her to Fata Morgana and get the little box of the Be' Giullare ("scatolina de' Be' Giullare", in the original). The next day, the fairies order the girl to pay a visit to Fata Morgana and fetch the little box. Memè intercepts her, warns her Fata Morgana will devour her and advises her how to proceed: she is to grease two creeking doors, climb up some stairs, call for Fata Morgana and steal the box, while the fairy is sharpening her teeth. Memè also gives her some grease. Prezzemolina does as instructed, calls for Fata Morgana and steals the little box. The fairy commands the doors to close on the girl, but they remain still. At a distance, Prezzemolina opens the little box and little animals, "like butterflies", fly out of the box. Memè appears to her and helps her close the animals inside the box again. Prezzemolina delivers the little box to the fairies. Lastly, the fairies order Prezzemolina to boil a cauldron of hot water, for after their return. Memè approaches Prezzemolina and asks what is she doing, she then explains the fairies plan to throw her in. Memè suggests Prezzemolina calls for the fairies to come check the cauldron, then they will shove the faires into the boiling water. After the fairies come back, Prezzemolina bids the fairies check the boiling cauldron, and both she and Memè shove the fairies into the hot water. Free from the fairies, Prezzemolina and Memè marry. The tale was also classified as type 428, "Il Lupo", wherein the wolf is replaced by a human helper.

=== O kunto tis Pedrusinella (Calimera) ===
In a Griko tale collected by Domenico Palumbo with the title O kunto tis Pedrusinella, from informant Assunta Gaetani, in Calimera, Grecia Salentina, and translated as Prezzemolina, a queen worries for not having children, despite one of her female servants giving birth to one each year. A beggar she gives alms to passes by her castle and she confides in him about her lack of children. The beggar suggests she breaks into the garden of the ogress in search of a herb (prezzemolo), which she must steal when the ogress is sleeping with her eyes open. The queen does as instructed and sends a servant to steal some prezzemolo the first night, which she eats and becomes pregnant, but she has to return twice more to the garden to ensure her pregnancy. After two times, the ogress notices there are plants missing and investigates. When the queen and the servant try to steal the herbs one last time, the ogress finds them and orders the queen to undress. The queen begs for her life and makes a deal with the ogress: she will deliver her unborn child to the ogress.

The queen gives birth to a girl with a moon on the front she names Pedrusinella (Prezzemolina). When she is two years old, she goes to school and has to pass by the ogress's house, who one day tells the girl to remind her mother of the promise that will be fulfilled eight years' time. The queen cries. Years later, as the deadline approaches, the girl passes by the ogress's house again on the way to her teacher and the ogress reminds that the time to fulfill her promise is in three days' time. The girl forgets about informing her mother about this, and the ogress ties a kerchief around her finger to make her remember. On the last day, the girl tells her mother about the ogress's promise, and the queen utters that the ogress can claim her prize herself. The girl returns to the ogress and repeats what her mother said, so the ogress kidnaps Prezzemolina.

Now under the ogress's power, the creature tells Prezzemolina she will leave for church, and orders her to clean out the manure from the basement. After the ogress leaves, the girl cries, when the ogress's son, Bonfiore, approaches her and offers his help: he waves a wand and the manure vanishes. Bonfiore then advises Prezzemolina to tell the ogress to deny she had any help and has never seen Bonfiore, for he will stay at the square to avoid suspicions. The ogress returns and suspects Prezzemolina had Bonfiore's help, though the girl denies it. The following morning, the ogress orders Prezzemolina to clean out the well by removing each stone and sweeping the earth, for she is going to church. After she leaves, the girl cries for the difficulty of the task, when Bonfiore appears to help her: he waves the wand to clean out the well. The ogress returns and suspects her son had a hand in this.

Thirdly, she goes to her sister's house and conspires with her to send Prezzemolina to be devoured: the ogress's sister is to invite her in on the pretense of giving her some almonds, then she is to sharpen her teeth and devour half of the girl, while saving the other part for her. Thus, the ogress sends Prezzemolina to her sister to fetch some yeast. Bonfiore intercepts Prezzemolina and advises her how to proceed: throw a rock at two fighting snakes, throw some bread at three guard dogs to feed them, give a handkerchief to a baker's wife cleaning out an oven with her breasts to dry her sweat; give some attention and delouse three beggars; stop a moving door with some silver stones (which Bonfiore gives Prezzemolina); at the ogress's sister's house, she will be given her own son while she goes to sharpen her teeth in another room, so Prezzemolina is to throw the baby away, steal the yeast and rush back. Prezzemolina follows his instructions to the letter, steals the yeast and hurries back, the ogress's sister commanding her servants to stop her, to no avail.

The ogress tells Bonfiore to fill a cauldron with water and bring some firewood to prepare to cook Prezzemolina, but Bonfiore enchants the utensils and house objects to answer for them and escapes with Prezzemolina. The ogress asks Bonfiore if he can help her carry the firewood, and breaks down the door, realizing her son is missing. On the road, Bonfiore and Prezzemolina flee for their lives with a peanut, an almond and a nut. The ogress goes after them, and the couple throw the fruits behind them to deter their pursuer: the peanut creates a church and they shapeshift into priests; the almond creates a garden and they pretend to be gardenkeepers, and finally, the nut creates a vast sea and they turn into fishes. The ogress cannot cross the sea and ceases her pursuit.

Now free from the ogress, Prezzemolina wants to visit her mother, but Bonfiore warns her to not be kissed by her mother, lest she forgets about him and their adventures. Bonfiore waves his wand and teleports Prezzemolina to her mother, who moves in to kiss her, but the youth forbids their reunion. At night, when Prezzemolina is asleep, her mother comes to kiss her brow, which makes her forget about Bonfiore. Her mother mentions to her daughter the latter's plans to marry Bonfiore, but the girl cannot recall any person called thus.

Prezzemolina marries that evening, and Bonfiore attends the ceremony as a guest. He offers to provide some entertainment to the occasion, and magics two puppets, a man and a woman representing him and Prezzemolina. Bonfiore plays with the puppets and jogs Prezzemolina's memory about the tasks the ogress ordered her to do and how the youth helped her avoid the dangers. Prezzemolina remembers everything, dismisses her previous suitor and marries Bonfiore.

=== Other tales ===
In an Italian tale from Marche collected by philologist Carlo Gargiolli with the title El fijo de l'Orco ("The Son of the Ogre"), a pregnant woman develops a craving for the vegetables in the Ogre's garden, so much so she steals them without the Ogre knowing. However, one day, the Ogre discovers her and makes a deal: when the woman's child is born, they are to be delivered to the Ogre. The woman gives birth to a girl. One day, the Ogre spots the girl and asks her to remind her mother of her deal. The girl does as requested, and the woman delivers the girl to the Ogre, to the latter's great satisfaction. The monster takes the girl to a chamber filled to the ceiling with clothes and orders her to wash, iron and fold them, otherwise he will devour her. After the Ogre leaves, his son finds her crying and offers to help her in exchange for a kiss. She agrees, and the Ogre's son uses a magic wand to fulfill the task for her. The next day, the Ogre points the girl to a sack of grains she must thresh, winnow, and made into bread. Again, the Ogre's son helps her in exchange for a kiss and with the magic wand. Still trying to have her fail, the Ogre directs her to a mountain she must climb, enter a house and steal from there a scattoletta ('a small box'). The Ogre's son intercepts her, gives her some items and advises her how to proceed: she is to throw some pieces of bread to a pack of hungry dogs; place hay for some horses, give rope to a woman fetching water from a well with her hair, smear the hinges of a gate with grease, take the box and come back. The girl does as instructed and comes back with the small box. As a last attempt, the Ogre tells his son to throw the girl out of the window, for he will stay under it to devour the girl after she falls into his mouth. The son, however, conspires with the girl, opens the small box and releases fat monsters through the window, which his father eats and dies. The girl is free and marries the Ogre's son.

In a Piemontese tale titled Mirabé, first collected from Montferrato in 1869 and published by Italian linguist Gian Luigi Beccaria, a woman named Prezzemolina is pregnant and starts to steal prezzemolo herbs from a neighbour fairy's garden. One day, the fairy discovers Prezzemolina and threatens her, demanding the woman delivers half of her daughter to the fairy. Startled with the impossibility of dividing a human girl, Prezzemolina agrees to surrender her own daughter to the fairy in one piece. In time, the fairy takes Prezzemolina's daughter and forces her on hard tasks: first, to wash and dry hundreds of shirts; next, to fill a mattress with feathers from nightingale birds and have it ready by afternoon. The fairy's son, Mirabé, helps the girl in each task: he asks for a kiss, is denied, but helps her anyway. As for the third task, the fairy orders the girl to go to an aunt's house, another sorceress, and ask for a box ("scatola") with three birds inside. Mirabé intercepts the girl and gives her provisions for the journey: some meat to be thrown to a lion and a wolf and some grease to smear on the hinges of a door. The girl follows Mirabé's advice to the letter and takes the box with her. On the journey back, she opens the box and lets loose the three birds. Mirabé appears to her and asks for a kiss in exchange for his help. She denies him. Still, he helps her and locks the birds inside the box. Mirabé's bride says she kissed someone else for a single carnation in return. Mirabé's mother devours his bride for her deed, and agrees to let Mirabé marry Prezzemolina's human daughter.

Professor Licia Masoni, from University of Bologna, collected two variants of Prezzemolina from two informants in Frassinoro. In both tales, the Prezzemolina-like protagonist is taken by a sorceress to her place and forced to perform tasks for her, one of which is to get a box from another sorceress.

== Analysis ==
=== Tale type ===
Folklorist D. L. Ashliman, scholar Jack Zipes and Italian scholars Alberto Maria Cirese and Liliana Serafini list Prezzemolina as a variant of tale type ATU 310, "The Maiden in the Tower" (akin to German Rapunzel), of the international Aarne-Thompson-Uther Index. Ashliman and Zipes also grouped Prunella under type 310.

The motif of the box from the witch appears in another tale type: ATU 425B, "Son of the Witch", which includes the ancient myth of Cupid and Psyche. In that regard, other scholars (like Jan-Öjvind Swahn, Geneviève Massignon and Walter Anderson) classified Prezzemolina as type AaTh 428, "The Wolf", a tale type considered by some scholars to be a fragmentary version of type 425B (Cupid and Psyche).

Renato Aprile, editor of the Italian Catalogue of Tales of Magic, classifies Prezzemolina as type AT 428, Il Lupo ("The Wolf"), but recognizes that its starting episode, the theft of the herb prezzemolo, ties it closer to type AT 310, Prezzemolina.

=== Motifs ===
==== The heroine's helper ====
According to Danish scholar Inger Margrethe Boberg, the heroine's helper in type 428 may be a young man cursed to be an animal in Northern Europe, while in variants from Southern Europe her helper is the witch's own son, who falls in love with the heroine. Similarly, according to Russian folklorist Lev Barag, in type 428, the heroine's helper may be a wolf (like in Russian or in Serbo-Croatian texts), a cat or a dog; the animal helper then turns into a human male that marries the heroine.

== See also ==
- The Tale about Baba-Yaga (Russian fairy tale)
- The Little Girl Sold with the Pears
- La Fada Morgana (Catalan folk tale)
- The Man and the Girl at the Underground Mansion
- Pájaro Verde (Mexican folktale)
- Los Tres Claveles (Spanish folktale)
- Fairer-than-a-Fairy (Caumont de La Force)
- Rapunzel
- Graciosa and Percinet
- Maroula
- Puddocky
- The Enchanted Canary
- The King of Love
- The Magic Swan Geese
- The Two Caskets
- The Water of Life
- The Witch
