= Ileana Simziana =

Romanian fairy tale

The Princess Who Would be a Prince

Folk tale
- Name: The Princess Who Would be a Prince
- Also known as: Iliane of the Golden Tresses; Helena Goldengarland; The Girl Who Pretended to be a Boy
- Aarne–Thompson grouping: ATU 514, "The Shift of Sex"
- Mythology: Romanian
- Country: Romania

Ileana Simziana or Ileana Sînziana (also translated to English as The Princess Who Would be a Prince or Iliane of the Golden Tresses and Helena Goldengarland) is a Romanian fairy tale collected and written down by Petre Ispirescu between 1872 and 1886. It tells the story of an unnamed youngest daughter of an emperor, who dresses up as a man, goes to serve another emperor and rescues the titular princess Ileana. The protagonist later goes on a quest to obtain the Holy Water and is hit by a monk's curse that causes her to transform into a man, Făt-Frumos, a Prince Charming figure. Făt Frumos then marries Ileana in the happy ending.

== Synopsis ==
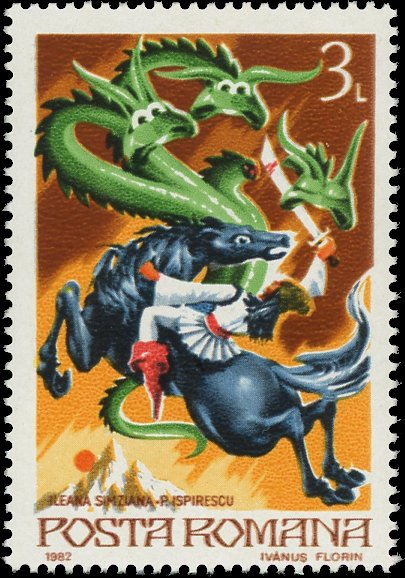
A Romanian stamp that shows the unnamed princess from Ileana Simziana fighting the dragon.

The tale introduces an emperor with three daughters, who is sad that he didn't have a son. The oldest daughter goes to the emperor and asks him what problem he is having and tells him that she will go to serve another emperor as a soldier only to make him happy. Then the emperor makes a copper bridge and turns into a wolf. The oldest daughter gets scared and goes back to the palace. The same happens with the middle daughter, who also gets scared of the wolf.

The youngest daughter goes on a journey with her father's old horse, and defeats him on three bridges, first as a wolf, then as a lion, then as a twelve-headed dragon. The girl arrives at the court of a "great and strong emperor" and he tells her to rescue Ileana Simziana, his daughter, who had been kidnapped by the giant.

The youngest daughter rescues her, and the emperor asks her to retrieve his herd enchanted mares, the girl succeeds in this spree. Then Ileana Simziana asks the emperor's daughter to bring the Holy Water kept in a small church above the Jordan and guarded by nuns who neither slept in the day nor in the night. The girl succeeds but the monk who takes care of the church prays to God and asks him if the thief is a man to make him a woman and vice versa, so that the princess becomes a prince: Făt-Frumos. Now a prince, he marries Ileana Simziana and they live happily ever after.

== Analysis ==
=== Tale type ===
In the Aarne–Thompson–Uther folktale classification system, the story and its variants count as tale type 514, "The Shift in Sex". Scholars often interpret them as tales of transgender identity and transition.

Rainer Wehse, in an article in Enzyklopädie des Märchens, recognized that the tale type shows great variety in motifs and in narrative sequences, but they gravitate around a common core: the transformation of a woman into a man. Similarly, Stith Thompson stated there is great variety in the tales indexed as this type.

In that regard, according to Richard MacGillivray Dawkins, a more general outline of the story is that a king has three daughters, and the third is the most valiant. She disguises herself as a man and joins the army in her father's place. She displays great acts of bravery and marries a princess. Eventually, someone tries to unmask the heroine's gender, until the heroine is sent on a mission where she transforms into a man by the curse of a magical being.

== Variants ==
=== Distribution ===
According to mid-20th century scholarship, the tale type is found in Europe, and most of its variants appear (in descending order) in Finland (17 tales), (Note: The tale type is known in the Finnish Folktale Catalogue as Nainen kuninkaan vävynä ("The Girl as the King's Son-in-Law").) Turkey (13 tales), Ireland (Note: In Ireland, the narrative appears in hagiography and in some genealogies. This includes miracles by St Abbán, St Gerald, and St Brendan.) and Lithuania (10 tales), Denmark (9 tales), Greece and Poland (Note: The tale type is known in Poland as Dziewczyna chłopcem ("Girl turned boy").) (6 tales), Romania (4 tales). Variants were also "sporadically" collected in Asia (Indonesia and Malaysia), in Iberian tradition (Spain, Portugal) and its former colonies (Cape Verde Islands, Mexico and Chile).

=== Europe ===
==== Romania ====
A variant of this story, entitled The Girl Who Pretended to be a Boy, was published in 1901 in Andrew Lang’s The Violet Fairy Book, and was an English translation of a tale from the 1894 Romanian Sept Contes Roumains (Seven Romanian Stories), edited by Jules Brun and Leo Bachelin.

In a variant collected by Pauline Schullerus from Harbachtal with the title Das tapfere Königstöchter ("The Valiant King's Daughter"), the Red Emperor, now a frail and 99-year-old man, receives a letter from his friend, the Green Emperor, summoning him to war. The Red Emperor laments the lack of male heirs, but his three daughters offer to take his place. The elders dress in male clothes and cross the bridge, but an iron-toothed wolf frightens them back to their kingdom. The third daughters disguises herself in masculine clothes, rides her horse and avoids an encounter with the wolf. Some miles later, she finds a golden swine rib on the floor, but her horse warns her against it. She reaches her destination, and the king sees the swine rib, demanding the knight to retrieve its owner. Later, he has to find a maiden with golden hair and the Sword of God. On this third task, the she-knight steals the sword, and God Himself and Saint Peter decree that she is to become a man, since she was already dressed in masculine clothes.

==== Moldova ====
Author and folklorist Grigore Botezatu published a Moldavian tale titled Prince Theodor and the Magic Stag. In this tale, a king and a queen have a daughter named Theodora. When she is of age, the king prepares to marry her to a prospective suitor, but does not seem to find his ring. He hangs down his head in shame, for, if he had a son, he would go to the other world and get the royal signet from his grandfather. Theodora offers to journey and get her grandfather's ring, so she dresses up as a man and departs. She goes to the north, to a deep, dark forest, and finds a dragon about to devour a white stag. Each animal beseeches Theodora to help one or the other; she chooses to help the stag and kills the dragon. Soon after, the white stag helps her in a chain of quests (ATU 550, "Bird, Horse and Princess"): to get her grandfather's ring from the Evil One, the King of Darkness, she has to get the white horse Cudalbul, which belongs to the Red King; to get the horse, she has to find a bride for the Red King, a maiden named Leonora Goldenlocks, who lives in a kingdom 33 kingdoms away and beyond 44 seas, kept inside a hazelnut and guarded in a castle of witches. After taking the hazelnut from the witches, they curse Theodora to become a man, Theodor. At the end of the tale, Theodor gets the horse and his grandfather's ring, and marries Leonora Goldenlocks.

==== North Macedonia ====
In a Macedonian variant collected from Ohrid by Bulgarian folklorist Kuzman Shapkarev with the title "Девойка, престорена на юнак" ("A Girl, Pretending to be a Boy"), the king wants a male heir, but the queen gives birth only to girls. So she disguises the youngest as a boy to appease her husband. His parents marry him to a princess, daughter of an Emperor. On their honeymoon, the disguised prince puts a sword between him and the princess. The Emperor invites his son-in-law to take part in a challenge to jump over a ditch and to tame his wild boar. Impressed with his abilities, the Emperor sends his son-in-law for a magical water and a pumpkin hung on a chain between heaven and earth. With the help of a talking horse, he obtains the items and is magically transformed into a man.

==== Albania ====
French scholar Auguste Dozon collected an Albanian tale in his book Manual de la langue Chkipe, which he translated to French as La fille changée en garçon. Albanologist Robert Elsie translated the tale into English with the title The Girl who Became a Boy. In this tale, a king with three daughters is called to war. Each of the princesses asks him the reason why he is worried, and he tells them about the war. The two elder princesses ask to be married off, but the youngest decides to wear masculine clothes and go to battle. She goes to another kingdom and releases a king's son from a dangerous kulshedra, and asks for a horse as reward. Later, she rides to a third kingdom where the king has set a suitor challenge: if anyone can jump over a moat and fetch a golden apple, they shall marry the princess. The girl, still masqueraded as a boy, rides the horse over the moat and grabs the apple, and marries the princess. However, on the wedding night, since both are girls, nothing happens, and the princess complains to her father about it. The king and the courtiers decide to get rid of "him": first, by sending "him" to take food to some woodcutters in a forest where a kulshedra lives; next, by sending "him" to be devoured by a wild mare (which is "his" horse's mother); lastly, to go to a church full of snakes to collect unpaid taxes. With "his" horse's help, the "boy" goes through the three tasks and avoids the danger. After the third task, the snakes curse their tax collector: if a boy, they shall become a girl; if a girl, they shall become a boy. The girl realizes he has become truly a man and goes to live with the princess he married.

==== Greece ====
The tale type registers 19 variants in Greece, according to the Greek Folktale Catalogue.

==== Norway ====
Scholar Ørnulf Hodne, in his book The Types of the Norwegian Folktale, located a single entry in Norway, classified as type 514, Jenten som tjente soldat, og ble gift med kongsdatter. In this entry, the heroine disguises as a soldier, marries a princess and eventually is transformed into a man by an old couple's curse.

==== Latvian ====
The tale type is also registered in Latvia, as type AaTh 514, Māsa karā ("The Sister in the War"): the heroine replaces her brother in the army and is promoted to the rank of a king's general. The king sends the general on difficult tasks and a sorcerer changes her into a man.

==== Lithuania ====
Lithuanian folklorist Jonas Balys, in his analysis of Lithuanian folktales (published in 1936), reported 10 Lithuanian variants of tale type 514, Lyties pakeitimas ("The Shift of Sex").

In a Lithuanian tale collected by August Leskien and Karl Brugmann with the title Ápė bajóro dukterį, katrà į vaiską iszëjo or Von der Edelmannstochter, die Soldat wurde ("About the nobleman's daughter who became a soldier"), a nobleman has nine daughters and laments the fact that he does not have sons. His youngest daughter offers to dress in male's clothes and join the army. She enlists as a soldier and rises to the rank of general. "He" impresses the king's daughter, who marries the general. However, on their honeymoon, the princess suspects something about her "husband". Her father sends the general with a letter to another king, and on the way "he" befriends people with supernatural powers who become "his" companions and help "him" in the second king's trials. When the companions return to the first king's realm, the general lags behind and enters a hut in the forest. After "he" leaves, a witch - who lives in the hut - curses him to become a man. He returns to his wife now a man, and they live happily.

==== Hungary ====
The Hungarian Folktale Catalogue (MNK) registers 6 variants of type 514, A Nemek Felcserélése, combined with other tale types.

=== Caucasus Region ===
==== Armenia ====
Armenian author and historian Marietta Shaginyan located tales about a woman transforming into a man in Armenia. In these tales, a widowed mother dresses her daughter in masculine clothes. Later in life, the daughter, now a young woman, impresses a king with her abilities and marries the king's daughter. After his daughter suspects there is something wrong with her "husband", the king sends the "son-in-law" on dangerous quests. The last task is to get a rosary from an old deva mother, who curses the woman to become a man as punishment.

Author Charles Downing translated and published an Armenian variant tilted The Girl who Changed into a Boy. In the story, it's the king's daughter, who the "hero" was married to, that orders her father to set the crossdressing knight into the perilous quests to dispose of "him".

==== Georgia ====
The tale is also reported in the Georgian folktale index as tale type ATU 514, "The Shift of Sex": the king's youngest daughter takes her father's place in masculine clothes; she works for another king, who sends her on errands or quests; the heroine's third quest is to go to the petrified kingdom, where a witch turns her into a man.

In a Georgian tale translated by Caucasologist Heinz Fähnrich with the title Wie das Mädchen zum Mann wurde ("How a Girl became a Man"), a king's vizir feels he is too old to join the king, and wishes he had sons. His three daughters try to dress in man's clothes to prove they can replace their father, but only the yougenst passes his test. The vizir approves his youngest daughter decision's, and tells her to introduce herself to the king as the vizir's son. "He" is welcomed as a guest in the king's palace. At night, the king's daughter comes to "his" room and explains she fell in love with "him" as soon as she saw "him" arrive at the city. The queen learns of the night encounter and tells her husband, the king, to send the "youth" to keep him away from their daughter. So, the king sends the vizir's "son" on missions: to get him apples of immortality, later the water of immortality; and to discover the secret of the petrified city. With the help of a Mother of the giantesses, the "hero" gets the items and goes to the petrified city, where "he" defeats a sorceress queen and restores the city to its original state. The sorceress queen breaks her spell, turns the vizir's son into a man, and is killed by him. The hero goes to the city of glass (where he got the water of immortality) to fetch his bride, and returns to his parents.

==== Kabardian people ====
In a Karbardian tale titled Die tapfere Tochter ("The Courageous Daughter"), a king has no sons, only three daughters, so he puts them through a test: they are to dress in masculine clothes, cross a bridge and face a certain danger on the bridge. The two elders fail, but the youngest soldiers on and leaves her kingdom behind. She reaches another kingdom whose Khan wishes to marry a certain maiden hidden by powerful spirits. The heroine agrees to bring her. On her way, she rescues some snakelings from a burning steppe, and their mother helps and guides the heroine to get the maiden. After the maiden is brought to the Khan, the maiden asks for a box with seven locks and a herd of a buffalo ox and seven buffalo cows that live in the sea. After the heroine brings the buffalo to the maiden, the buffalo curses the heroine to become a man.

==== Abkhazian people ====
In a tale from the Abkhazian people with the title "Царь и его везир" ("The King and his Vizir"), a vizir sends his eldest son to the king's army, but decides to play a trick on him: before his son reaches the king's castle, the vizir pretends to be a highwayman to scare him. His elder fails the test, so does his youngest. His third child, a girl, dresses in male garments and passes his test. "He" rides the horse to the house of three "adauys" and breaks down the gate. The "adauys" are impressed with their guest's demonstration of power and welcome "him". Later at night, the "adauys"'s three sisters enter the guest's room, one at a time. The guest declines any romantic advances by saying "he" is on a mission. The youngest sister, who possesses omniscient powers, knows their guest is a girl, but predicts that "he" will become a man in the future, and advises her to choose their lamest horse the next morning. The "hero" then goes to the king and is tasked with getting the heart and liver of a big boar, and three cups of milk from a stag. During the second mission, "he" reaches a petrified city. Its queen cast a spell over the city, for whatever she says becomes reality. The "hero" finds the queen and forces her to reverse the spell, to turn every man into woman, and every woman into man. The hero then kills the queen. On the way back, he gets the cups of milk from the stag and returns to the king. On the way back to his father, he passes by the "adauys"'s house and takes their three sisters as wives for him and his brothers.

=== Asia ===
==== Turkey ====
In the Typen türkischer Volksmärchen ("Turkish Folktale Catalogue"), by Wolfram Eberhard and Pertev Naili Boratav, both scholars grouped tales about a woman-to-man transformation under one type: TTV 97, "Der weinende Granatapfel" ("The Weeping Pomegranate"), with 13 variants. In this tale type, a padishah's daughter is raised as his son, and escapes on a horse before the circumcision ceremony. "He" works for another king and is betrothed to the princess. The princess has a secret lover of supernatural origin and both send the "suitor" on difficult quests, during which the "suitor" becomes a man.

Turkologist Theodor Menzel translated a Turkish variant titled Die Geschichte von von dem weinenden Granat-Apfel und der lachenden Quitte (translated into English as "The Story of the Crying Pomegranate and the Laughing Bear"). In this story, a padishah has nine daughters and wishes for a son. When his wife becomes pregnant again, he threatens to kill her if another daughter is born. So a tenth is born, but her mother dresses her as a boy and raises her as one. Time passes, and the padishah sets a date for the "boy"'s circumcision as a rite of passage, but "he" manages to delay the ceremony for two years. On the third year, "he" escapes on "his" talking horse to another kingdom. There, "he" protects the king against a Dew, and earns the king's favour. "He" tells he wants to marry a maiden clad in red garments "he" saw in one of the palace's rooms. The red-clad maiden tells her prospective "husband" she will consult with a dream oracle before she agrees to their marriage. In truth, her "dream oracle" is her secret lover, the son of the Padishah of the Peris, who comes to her in the shape of a dove and convinces her to send the "knight" to get first a mirror from the Dews, and later a Säbelstein from the Dews. The "boy" gets the mirror and the Säbelstein. After the second task, the Dew mother curses the "boy", if a man, to become a woman, and if a woman, to become a man, and so it happens: the "boy" is changed into a man. Lastly, the red-clad maiden tells her husband-to-be to get the weeping pomegranate and the laughing quince from a distant garden - a trap set by the son of the Padishah of the Peris. With his horse's help and the aid of three magical objects he stole from three quarreling men, he gets the objects and presents them to the king. The son of the padishah of the peris admits defeat and leaves the red-clad maiden to her fate. So the knight marries the red-clad maiden and visits his parents to tell the whole story. Turkologist Ignác Kúnos collected a very similar variant from Adakale with the title Die Geschichte von dem weinenden Granat-Apfel und der lachenden Zitrone ("The Story of the weeping pomegranate and the laughing lemon").

Author Somnath Dhar published a Turkish tale titled The Magic Mirror: a king does not have any children, but prefers to sire male heirs. When his wife, the queen, announces she is pregnant, the king warns her that if it is a girl, he will execute her. Fearing for her life, she confides in her nurse, who advises her to raise the girl as a boy. When the "prince" is nearly sixteen years old, the king wishes to see "him" betrothed. The queen calls for her child and pours out her worries to them. The "prince" agrees to carry out the betrothal, and plans to ride their horse to regions unknown, but promises to return one day. They carry out their plan and escapes with their horse to another realm. Their colt gives them a tuft of its hair and says he can be summoned. The "prince" finds work as a kitchen-boy in a prince's palace and raises in ranks to the position of chef. The master of the mansion, another prince, summons his chef and asks them about their origins. The "prince" lies that they got lost from their father's caravan and went to find work somewhere else. The second prince tells them to choose one of his daughters as their wife, and they choose the third and youngest, naughty and playful, yet "winsome and alluring". The third daughter agrees to marry the cook, but retires to her chambers to consult with her secret lover. A dove flies in through her window, takes a bath in a bowl and becomes a man. The secret lover suggests they send the chef to get her "the finest mirror in the world", kept by a demon in a garden. The chef rides the helpful horse to the demon's garden and gets the mirror. Enraged at the intruder, the demon casts a curse: if the intruder is a man, he shall become a woman; if the intruder is a woman, she shall become a man. The "prince" truly becomes a man and returns to the mansion with the mirror. The newly transformed prince marries the third daughter and goes back to his parents with his new wife.

=== Africa ===
==== Cape Verde Islands ====
Anthropologist Elsie Clews Parsons collected a variant from Cape Verde Islands, from informant Antonio d'Andrade from Fogo. In this tale, titled The Princess Who Groans: Man or Woman?, a prince named Bonito has a dream about a maiden named Aldraga Jiliana, who "is enchanted at the bottom of the sea, seven towers of Babel, who lives on the Gold Mountain", where no male fly nor human can reach. With his enchanted horse and three colored kerchiefs, Bonito goes to the Gold Mountain, lures Aldraga Jiliana to his horse and takes her to his kingdom. However, Aldraga Jiliana remains speechless, and Bonito's father, the king, announces that whoever makes Aldraga Jiliana speak shall marry her. Some time later, a youth named Marco rides to the castle with his mule. The mule advises him to go to the store and tune three violins; the maiden will react and groan in response. Marco follows the instructions and makes Aldraga Jiliana speak. However, Bonito's mother, the queen, suspects Marco is a woman, not a man, and devises tests to check her identity: to plant a grapevine and smash the grapes for wine; to go to a farm and pick a bunch of fruits; to bathe in the sea. With the mule's help, Marco passes all tests. The king, Bonito's father, marries "Marco", following the queen's suspicions. Later that night, Aldraga calls to Marco to lie with her, because Aldraga comes from a land where "woman marries woman". A queen's servant overhears the exchange and hurries to tell the queen. "Marco" receives the visit of Saint Peter (San Pedro), his godfather, who calls him "Marta". Saint Peter warns that the queen is coming to kill "him", but, to save "him", equips him with male organs.

== See also ==
- List of Romanian fairy tales
- Ileana Cosânzeana
- Sânziană
- The Horse Lurja
- Vasilisa the Priest's Daughter
- The Dog in the Sea, another fairy tale interpreted as having a queer subtext
- The Girl as Soldier (Russian folktale)
