= The Giant Who Had No Heart in His Body =

Norwegian fairy tale

The Giant Who Had No Heart in His Body (Norwegian: Jetten uten hjerte) is a Norwegian fairy tale collected by Asbjørnsen and Moe.

George MacDonald retold it as "The Giant's Heart" in Adela Cathcart. A version of the tale also appears in The Pink Fairy Book by Andrew Lang and in A Book of Giants by Ruth Manning-Sanders.

== Synopsis ==
A king had seven sons, and when the other six went off to find brides, he kept the youngest with him because he could not bear to be parted from them all. They were supposed to bring back a bride for him, as well, but they found a king with six daughters and wooed them, forgetting their brother. But when they returned, they passed too close to a giant's castle, and he turned them all, both princes and princesses, to stone in a fit of rage.

When they did not return, the king, their father, tried to prevent the youngest brother from following, but he went looking for his brothers. On the way, he gave food to a starving raven, helped a salmon back into the river, and gave a starving wolf his horse to eat. The wolf let the prince ride on him, instead, and showed him the giant's castle, telling him to go inside. The prince was reluctant, fearing the wrath of the giant, but the wolf persuaded the prince to enter the castle, for there he would encounter not the giant, but the princess the giant kept prisoner.

The princess was very beautiful, and the prince wanted to know how he could kill the giant and set her and his family free. The princess said that there was no way, as the giant did not keep his heart in his body and therefore could not be killed. When the giant returned, the princess hid the prince, and asked the giant where he kept his heart. He told her that it was under the door sill. The prince and princess dug there the next day and found no heart. The princess strewed flowers over the door sill, and when the giant returned, told him that it was because his heart lay there. The giant admitted it was not there and told her it was in the cupboard. As before, the princess and the prince searched, to no avail; once again, the princess strewed garlands of flowers on the cupboard and told the giant it was because his heart was there. Thereupon the giant revealed to her that, in fact, in a distant lake was an island, upon which there sat a church; within the church was a well where a duck swam; in the duck's nest was an egg; and in the egg was the giant's heart.

The prince rode to the lake, and the wolf jumped to the island. The prince called upon the raven he had saved from starvation, and it brought him the keys to the church. Once inside, he coaxed the duck to him, but it dropped the egg in the well first, and the prince called on the salmon to get him the egg. The wolf told him to squeeze the egg, and when he did, the giant screamed. The wolf told him to squeeze it again, and the giant promised anything if he would spare his life. The prince told him to bring his brothers and their brides back to life, and the giant did so. Then the prince squeezed the egg into two and went home with the princess as his bride; accompanying him were his brothers and their brides, and the king rejoiced.

=== Variants ===
In a harsher version, the boy splits the heart in two and eats it with the wolf, chopping off the giant's head and keeping it as a trophy.

For international variants see The Death of Koschei the Deathless.

== Translations ==
The tale was translated as Cinder-Lad and his Six Brothers and included in the compilation Fairy stories my children love best of all.

== Adaptations ==
A Hungarian variant of the tale was adapted into an episode of the Hungarian television series Magyar népmesék ("Hungarian Folk Tales") (hu), with the title A kõszivü ember ("The Man with a Heart of Stone"). In this version, three brothers depart home and arrive at a cottage, where an old man lets them spend the night. When they leave the next day, the old man asks them to find him a bride. The brothers go to a kingdom, and marry three princesses. On their way back, the couples pass by the old man's cottage. He petrifies five of them and takes the youngest princess for his wife. He reveals to her his heart is located inside a bird inside a mountain, far away. Years later, a boy is born to the mother of the brothers and leaves home to find their whereabouts. On his way, he shares his food with a ram and a dove, which, in return, give him a hair and feather to summon the animals should the boy need.

=== The Storyteller ===
The story was retold by John Hurt as an episode in Jim Henson's The Storyteller which had Elliot Spiers as Prince Leo and Frederick Warder as the giant. It takes on a sadder tone, as the prince who is named Leo befriends the giant after freeing him from years of captivity in his father's castle. After journeying to the mountain to get the egg and eventually releasing his brothers, Prince Leo beseeches them not to break the egg containing the giant's heart, as he promises now to be good. The brothers break the heart, and a hill forms where the giant falls. The Storyteller later mentioned that when Prince Leo became king, he covered up what happened by stating that he returned the heart to the giant who never bothered his kingdom again.

== Analysis ==
=== Classification ===
This tale is classified in the Aarne-Thompson-Uther Index type ATU 302, "The Giant (Ogre) who had no heart in his body" or "Ogre's Heart in the Egg". These stories tell of a villain who hides his life force or "heart" in a place outside his body, in a box or inside a series of animals, like a Russian matryoshka. The hero must seek and destroy the heart to vanquish the villain. With the help of the villain's wife or female prisoner (a princess), he locates the ogre's weakness and, aided by grateful animals, destroys the heart. In regards to the aid of animals, in some variants the hero gains feathers and tufts of hair from the animals with the ability to shapeshift and with this power infiltrates the villain's den to listen to his weakness or transforms into animals to destroy the egg that houses the monster's soul.

According to professor Stith Thompson, the giant's heart, in Asian variants, is hidden in a bird or insect, while in European tales it is guarded in an egg.

=== Distribution ===
The tale type is very popular, with 250 tales recorded throughout Europe, Asia, America and North Africa.

Scholarship acknowledges the considerable antiquity and wide diffusion of the motif of the "external soul" (or life, "death", heart). For instance, folklorist Sir James George Frazer, in his book The Golden Bough, listed and compared several stories found across Eurasia and North Africa where the villain of the tale (ogres, witches and giants) willingly extracts their soul, hides it in an animal or in a box (casket) and therefore becomes unkillable, unless the hero destroys the recipient of their soul.

=== Combination with other tale types ===
The tale sometimes is combined with other tale types as its introduction: ATU 552, "The Girls Who Married Animals"; ATU 400, "The Quest for the Lost Wife"; ATU 303A, "Seven Sisters as Wives for Seven Brothers" or ATU 554, "The Grateful Animals".

One example of this combination is the tale collected by folklorist Josef Haltrich (de) from the Transylvanian Saxons. In this tale, titled Von den zwölf Brüdern, die zwölf Schwestern zu Frauen suchen ("About twelve brothers that sought twelve sisters as wives"), eleven brothers depart home to seek work and brides for themselves, leaving their youngest brother with their father. They arrive at an old man's hut and refuse to work for him. They continue on their travels until they reach the cottage of an old witch that petrifies them. Meanwhile, the youngest brother leaves home and on his journeys spares the life of a lion, an eagle and a fish, which promise the youth to help in the future. The youth later reaches the cottage of the old man and works for him for a year; when he is paid his wages, his employer informs him of the witch's threat. The youth meets the witch and tries to shoot her, but she scoffs any danger the boy might pose and reveals that her "life" is a light inside an egg, inside a duck that wades about a lake hidden in a faraway mountain.

== Other works ==
The video game Paper Mario tells a variant of the story when Mario must battle the villain Tubba Blubba, a giant Spike whose heart was removed by Bowser to gain invincibility. Mario is forced into dispatching him by Bow, the leader of a town populated by ghosts whom Tubba is terrorizing. Mario learns the secret to his "invincibility" and battles the heart of Tubba hidden at the bottom of a well, followed by Tubba Blubba himself after it returns to his body and he becomes vulnerable again.

Baldur's Gate II: Throne of Bhaal also includes an evil giant who cannot be defeated until his heart is located and destroyed.

Re:Zero − Starting Life in Another World includes a character who becomes invincible by removing his heart from his body and placing it in another person. He can only be defeated by attacking the heart and forcing him to take it back into his body.

== See also ==
- Koschei the Deathless
- Snow-White-Fire-Red
- The Dragon and the Prince
- The Red Ettin
- The Sea-Maiden
- The Three Daughters of King O'Hara
- The Young King Of Easaidh Ruadh
- What Came of Picking Flowers
