= The Three Daughters of King O'Hara =

Irish fairy tale

Folk tale
- Name: The Three Daughters of King O'Hara
- Aarne–Thompson grouping: ATU 425A (The Animal as Bridegroom)
- Country: Ireland
- Region: Kerry
- Published in: Myths and Folk-lore of Ireland

The Three Daughters of King O'Hara is an Irish fairy tale collected by Jeremiah Curtin in Myths and Folk-lore of Ireland, about a princess that marries a youth under a canine skin, betrays his secret and goes after him when he disappears. It is related to the international cycle of the Animal as Bridegroom or The Search for the Lost Husband, wherein a human maiden marries a man under an animal curse, loses him and has to search for him.

== Source ==
Reidar Th. Christiansen identified its origin as County Kerry.

== Synopsis ==
A king had three daughters. One day, when he was away, his oldest daughter wished to marry. She got his cloak of darkness, and wished for the handsomest man in the world. He arrived in a golden coach with four horses to take her away. Her second sister wished for the next best man, and he arrived in a golden coach with four horses to take her away. Then the youngest wished for the best white dog, and it arrived in a golden coach with four horses to take her away. The king returned and was enraged when his servants told him of the dog.

The oldest two were asked by their husbands how they wanted them during the day: as they are during the day, or as they are at night. Both want them as they are during the day. Their husbands both are men during the day but seals at night. The youngest was also asked and answered the same, so her husband was a dog by day and a handsome man by night.

She gave birth to a son. Her husband went hunting and warned her not to weep if anything happened to the child. A gray crow took the baby when he was a week old, and she did not weep. It happened again, with a second son, but with their third child, a daughter, she dropped one tear, which she caught in a handkerchief. Her husband was very angry.

Soon after, the king invited his three daughters and their husbands to his home. Late at night, the queen went to look in their bedrooms, and saw that her two oldest had seals in their beds, but her youngest had a man. She found and burned the dog's skin. The husband jumped up, angry, and said that if he had been able to stay three nights under her father's roof he could have been a man both day and night, but now he had to leave her.

He set out, but she chased after him, never letting him out of sight. They came to a house, and he sent her to spend the night inside. A little boy there called her mother, and a woman there gave her scissors that would turn rags into cloth of gold. The next day, she chased after her husband again, and they came to another house, where another little boy called her mother, and a woman gave her a comb that would turn a diseased head healthy, and give it gold hair. The third day, she still chased after her husband, and the third house held a one-eyed little girl. The woman realized what weeping had done. She took her handkerchief where she had caught her tear, and put the eye back. The woman gave her a whistle that would summon all the birds of the world.

They went on, but he explained that the Queen of Tír na nÓg had cursed him, and now he must go and marry her. She followed him into the lower kingdom and stayed with a washerwoman, helping her. She saw a henwife's daughter, all in rags, and snipped her rags with the scissors, so she wore cloth of gold. Her mother told the queen, who demanded them. The princess asked for a night with her husband in return, and the queen agreed but drugged her husband. The next day, the princess cured another daughter of the henwife with the comb, and the same exchange was made for it.

The princess blew the whistle and consulted the birds. They told her that only her husband could kill the queen, because a holly-tree, before the castle, held a wether, the wether held a duck, the duck held an egg, and the egg held her heart and life, and only her husband could cut the holly tree. Then she blew the whistle again, attracting a hawk and a fox and caught them. She traded the whistle for a third night, but left a letter with his servants, telling him all.

Her husband read the letter and met her by the tree. He cut it down. The wether escaped, but the fox caught it; the duck escaped, but the falcon caught it, and the egg was crushed, killing the queen.

The princess and her husband live happily in Tír na nÓg.

== Analysis ==
=== Tale type ===
In the late 19th century, Alfred Nutt described the story as a "Beauty and the Beast tale", another type of the ATU index related to the animal bridegroom tales. Similarly, in the early 20th century, Norwegian folklorist Reidar Thoralf Christiansen classified the tale as belonging to type 425, "The Search for the Lost Husband", of the international Aarne-Thompson-Uther Index.

More specifically, the tale is classified in the international Aarne-Thompson-Uther Index as type ATU 425A, "The Animal as Bridegroom". in this tale type, the heroine is a human maiden who marries a prince that is cursed to become an animal of some sort. She betrays his trust and he disappears, prompting a quest for him. For example, the hero of the tale was said to be transformed into a white dog by the druidecht of the Queen of Tir-na-Nog.

The tale also contains type ATU 302, "The Ogre's (Devil's) Heart in the Egg", a set of stories where the villain hides its heart or soul in an external place and can only be defeated if the heroes destroy its external location.

=== Motifs ===
According to Hans-Jörg Uther, the main feature of tale type ATU 425A is "bribing the false bride for three nights with the husband". In fact, when he developed his revision of Aarne-Thompson's system, Uther remarked that an "essential" trait of the tale type ATU 425A was the "wife's quest and gifts" and "nights bought".

According to Jan-Öjvind Swahn's study on some 1,100 variants of Cupid and Psyche and related types, the motif of the "wishing chair" appears in Celtic, Irish and British variants. In the same study, he concluded that the dog as the animal husband appears "confined to the Germanic and Celtic areas".

The motif of the separation of the heroine from her children is located by scholarship across Celtic and Germanic speaking areas.

== Variants ==
=== Europe ===
==== Ireland ====
In a variant from County Mayo, collected from a sixty-year-old woman named Una Canavan with the title The Hill of Needles, a widowed nobleman has three daughters. One day, he forgets to lock up a certain door of his house, and his eldest daughter enters it. She talks to the chair that she wants to marry an officer. She tells her middle sister, who wishes to the chair for a husband. The third also wishes to the chair, which says a white fawn shall marry her. The promised husbands appear to the ladies, including the white fawn. The lady learns the fawn is a man, who asks her which form she prefers; she answers that he should be a man at night and a fawn by day. She wants to visit her family, but her husband warns her that if she sheds a tear, a coach will not return for her to bring her home to the fawn husband. She goes to her father's house and gives birth to a son, who is taken from her. The next year, she gives birth to a daughter, who is also taken from her. She sheds a tear and the coach does not come. The lady returns to the husband's home on foot and finds only a field of nettles. She sees another coach with her husband inside and follows it; along the road, three houses that she visits, each housing one of her husband's sisters and one of her children. Her sisters-in-law give her scissors, a tablecloth and a comb. Her husband bids her goodbye, since his coach will traverse the Hill of Big Needles and the Hill of Little Needles, reachable only by iron shoes. She throws some blood on her husband's shirt as he departs, and looks for a blacksmith to create on the iron shoes. She reaches the other side, finds a woman crying about the man's shirt with blood and washes it. The lady buys three nights with her husband from the new wife and learns from him that his new wife can inly be killed by finding an egg inside a duck, inside a ram, inside a well, and throw it at her mole.

Author Éilís Ní Dhuibhne used an Irish variant, archived as a manuscript in the Department of Irish Folklore, as a framing device of her book The Inland Ice. In this tale, a farmer's daughter is friends with a white goat, and she eventually falls in love with him. One day, the goat vanishes, and the girl goes after him, guided by an old woman. She finds the goat, who asks her if she prefers him as a goat or human during the day. He becomes a man at night, and the set a up a house to live together, with her bearing three sons in the following years. However, after each baby is born, the white goat warns her not to shed a tear over anything that happens to their children, otherwise she will lose him forever. As the white goat predicted, the babies disappear from her bed, and she sheds no tears the first two times. However, the third time, she sheds a tear for the loss of her child, and the white goat leaves her. The girl chooses to follow after him. After a long journey, the goat finds a dockleaf to rest under and sees that his wife is following him. Despite his words of disencouragement, the girl chooses to keep following him. Thus, everytime the white goat stops to rest, he bids his wife finds shelter in a nearby house, by saying she is friends with the white goat. In each house, a woman gives her shelter for the night, food and drink, and a gift: a comb that gilds her hair in the first house, a pair of magical scissors in the second, and a magical tablecloth in the third one. In the third house she also finds her three sons under the care of the third woman. After passing by the three houses, she continues on her trail behind the white goat, who reaches the top of a cliff and the ground swallows him. The girl despairs at losing him, but an old man appears and gives her a spade to dig up a hole in the ground: she finds a slab of stone and a set of stairs leading further underground. The girl climbs down the stairs and reaches another land, where she takes shelter with an old couple who listens to her story. The couple then reveals a woman names Scabby Crow lives in a castle beyond, she has three daughters (the women who gifted her the comb, scissors and tablecloth) and a son (the white goat). Some time later, the girl meets the Scabby Crow, who says a witch cursed her, and shows some interest in the fine items the girl has. The white goat's wife then makes a barter with Scabby Crow: first the scissors, then the comb for one night with her son, the human white goat. Scabby Cow talks with the witch to allow for a night visit, and she takes each item with her. The girl goes to visit her husband in human form, but as soon as he sits on the bed he falls as asleep - a trick of the witch. The girl manages to talk to her husband on the second night, who asks her to find a way to convince the witch to lift her spell. Lastly, the girl trades the tablecloth with the witch, with agrees to lift the curse over the white goat and the Scabby Crow, and brings the girl's three children to her presence. After the curse is lifted, the former white goat wishes to live with his wife, but the girl declines and wishes to have a simple life with her parents, and takes her children with her to their house.

==== Wales ====
Scottish folklorist John Francis Campbell claimed that an oral version told in 1812 to a man named John Dewar by a servant woman, was a version of a "popular tale" written in Wales "about 400 years ago". In this tale, titled an t urisgeal aig na righre Righ na thuirabhinn agus righ nan Ailp, the King of Ailp and his kingdom were killed by the druids, leaving only a son and a daughter. His daughter was trained by the druids and gained skin green as moss. The son climbs a mountain name Bean ghloine with his father's sword and scepter. Another druid curses him into animal form (a greyhound). He abandons the items on the mountain and flees to his sister. The prince, then, must remain as a greyhound until a maiden agrees to marry him, and his sister nurses three children and receives a kiss from a king's son. Some time later, the King of the Urbhin, while at war with another king, loses his way into a thick mist and ends up at the greyhound's castle. He kicks up the former king's bones and the greyhound, for this affront, demands the king of Urbhin surrenders one of his daughters as ransom. The king surrenders his daughter and she marries the greyhound. The princess lives with the greyhound and discovers he is a human prince. They marry, and her sisters become jealous. The princess's brother also falls in love with the greyhound's sister, the green girl, after drinking a potion of "mheadair Bhuidh" (yellow mead) from her hand. The princess's sisters conspire with a druid to dethrone her sister and become the greyhound's queen: when the time comes to give birth, for three times the princess's child is taken from her by a green hand in a window, but each child cries and the mother takes the teardrops. The greyhound, now a human prince, announces he will marry the one who can retrieve his father's sword and scepter from the glass mountain. The princess accomplishes it, but her sisters take the credit. Next, they must wash the bloodstained shirts that belonged to those slain by the druids. The princess also washes all but one, and stays three nights on the (now human) greyhound's bed. On the first two nights, he is asleep, but acknowledges his wife on the third night, and they return to the former kingdom of Ailp with the green girl (his sister). The tale continues as the "wicked druid" Dubhmalurraidh changes one of the princess's sisters into her shape, to cast the king into confusion. However, the green sister produces her father's sword and scepter (retrieved by her sister-in-law) and her three nephews. Novelist Barbara Ker Wilson reprinted the tale as The Ailp King's Children and sourced it to Scotland.

==== Iceland ====
Adeline Ritterhaus summarized another Icelandic variant she named Der zum Riesen verzauberte Königssohn ("The King's Son changed into a Giant"). In this tale, a royal couple has three daughters. One day, the king gets lost in a thick mist, until a giant appears with a proposition: he will save the king's life, in exchange for the king's third daughter. After three times, the king concedes and agrees. He returns home and explains the story to his daughters. The youngest daughter marries the giant. The princess gives birth to three children, two boys and a girl, which are taken from her by a giantess and a red-brown she-dog. At the end of the tale, the giant is disenchanted into his true form, Prince Sigurdur, who reveals that the giantess was his mother and the she-dog his sister, now both restored to their original forms.

=== Americas ===
==== United States ====
In a variant from Letcher County, Kentucky collected by Marie Campbell with the title The Girl That Married a Flop-Eared Hound, a widowed king walks in the wood and sees a "fine hound-dog with long flop-ears". He asks the dog what it is doing there and the dog, to the king's surprise, answers that it wants to marry one of the king's daughters. Only the youngest daughter accepts the proposal, with the condition that she can visit her family whenever she wants. On their wedding day, the sisters use blindfolds to bear the humiliation of having a dog as brother-in-law, but instead a fine young man appears to marry their sister. One day, the princess is pregnant and wishes to give birth under her father's roof. The dog husband agrees, as long as she never reveals her husband's name. On two occasions, she gives birth to her child (the first a boy, the second a girl), who disappears two days after their birth when "fairy music" plays, leaving only wine and cookies on the cradle. The princess's sisters accuse the dog husband, and insist she reveals his name, but she remains steadfast. On the third visit, however, the princess gives birth to her third child and reveals her husband's name, "Sunshine on the Dew". This time, the child disappears, and so does her husband. She then goes on a quest for him, meeting three old women on the journey who give her a pair of scissors, a thimble and a needle. The princess uses the magical objects as bargaining chips to be able to spend a night with her husband, who is to be married to another woman. The tale was also classified as ATU 425A, "The Animal as Bridegroom".

== See also ==
- East of the Sun and West of the Moon
- Prince Wolf
- The Brown Bear of Norway
- The Daughter of the Skies
- The Dragon and the Prince
- The Enchanted Pig
- The Giant Who Had No Heart in His Body
- The Sea-Maiden
- The Tale of the Hoodie
- The Young King Of Easaidh Ruadh
- What Came of Picking Flowers
- The White Hound of the Mountain
