= The Fair Fiorita =

Italian fairy tale

The Fair Fiorita is an Italian fairy tale collected by Thomas Frederick Crane in Italian Popular Tales. Italo Calvino included a variant of it, The Princesses Wed to the First Passer-By, in his Italian Folktales.

== Synopsis ==
A king with three daughters and a son married his daughters to the first men to pass before the castle at noon: a swineherd, a huntsman, and a grave-digger. His son did not go to the wedding, but walked in the garden, where he heard a voice saying that the man was happy who was kissed by the fair Fiorita. He set out in search of her.

Three years later, he saw a palace with a fountain in front of it, and a child playing in the fountain. He approached, and the child cried for his mother, who proved to be his oldest sister. He was glad at her good fortune, stemming from the enchantments of a magician on her husband, as on his other brothers-in-law. They told him to go toward the sunrise, which was the way both to his other two sisters and to Fiorita, and gave him hogs' bristles to throw to the ground if he were in great need.

He went toward the sunrise, and found his other two sisters. The middle one gave him feathers, and the youngest a human bone and told him that an old woman could give him more directions about Fiorita. The old woman lived across from the castle where Fiorita lived, and she came by the window. He fell in love at once, but the old woman warned him that the king would marry her only to a man who found her in a hidden place, and many princes had already died, trying.

He commissioned a cymbal that he could hide in, and had the maker sell it to the king on the condition that he take it every three days to repair it. The king bought it and gave it to Fiorita, who took it to her room. At night, the prince called to her, until she and her maids of honor had searched, and she had concluded that she had imagined the repeated calls, and told them not to come again. He emerged and begged a kiss from her. She allowed it, and a rose formed. She told him that the rose would let him find her first in her hiding place, then among a hundred maidens, but that her father would set other tasks afterwards, more terrible.

After he had found Fiorita, twice, the king put him in a room, filled with fruit, and commanded that he eat it all. He threw down the hogs' bristles, and a great herd of swine appeared and ate it all. The king then demanded birds that sang so sweetly that they would put the princess to sleep. The prince threw down the feathers, and birds appeared that put not only the princess but the king to sleep. The third time, the king demanded that they produce, on the next morning, a two-year-old child who could speak, or he would execute them both. The prince threw down the bone, and the child sprung up.

The king gave his son-in-law his crown and held a great feast for their wedding, to which his sisters and their husbands, and the prince's father came. So the prince and Fiorita reigned over two kingdoms.

== Motifs ==
The Princesses Wed to the First Passer-By does not include his sneaking into the princess's presence, or the need to discover her in a hiding place, as indeed many similar fairy tales, where the hero is helped by his brothers-in-law, as in The Death of Koschei the Deathless and The Three Enchanted Princes and What came of picking Flowers.

The finding in a hiding place is a motif that can also occur on its own, as in The Princess Who Was Hidden Underground and The Golden Lion.

== See also ==
- Bash Chelik
- Dapplegrim
