= The Young King of Easaidh Ruadh =

Scottish fairy tale

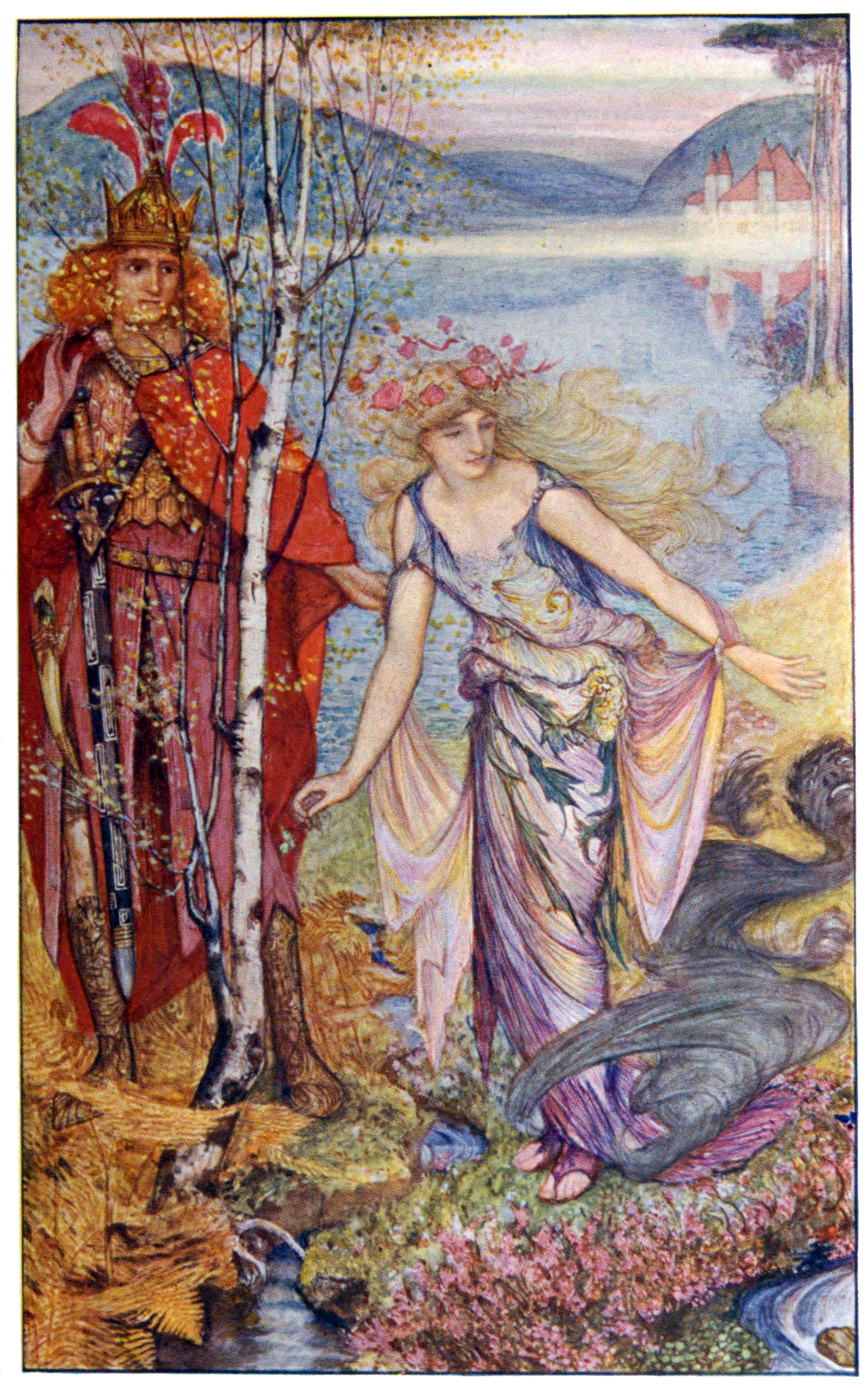

The Young King Of Easaidh Ruadh is a Scottish fairy tale collected by John Francis Campbell in his Popular Tales of the West Highlands, listing his informant as James Wilson, a blind fiddler, in Islay. Andrew Lang included a variant in The Lilac Fairy Book, as "The King of the Waterfalls", listing his source West Highland Tales.

== Synopsis ==
The young king of Easaidh Ruadh decided to amuse himself by playing a game with the Gruagach. He sought advice from a Seanagal first. He did not take his advice to not go, but the Seanagal told him to ask for the prize, if he won, the cropped rough-skinned maid behind the door. He went and won at the game. When he would not be put off from his prize, they gave him the maid, and she turned into a beautiful woman. He married her. He went to play again, and his wife warned him that it was her father, and he should take only the dun shaggy filly that has the stick saddle on her. He won, and got the filly.

He went to play a third time, and this time he lost. The Gruagach set as the stakes that he must get the Glaive of Light of the king of the oak windows, or lose his head. He went back to his wife. She told him he had the best wife and the second best horse and should not be afraid. She saddled the horse herself; the saddle looked like wood but was full of sparklings with gold and silver. She told him to listen to his horse.

The horse bore him to the castle of the king of the oak windows and sent him into the king's chambers while the king ate, warning him to take it softly. He made a soft sound, and the horse told him they must flee. They were chased by a swarm of brown horses, which they could outrun, and then by a swarm of black horses, one white-faced and with a rider. The King's horse told him that horse was its brother and the first best horse, and faster; he must cut off the head of the rider, the king. He did, and his horse had him ride the black horse home. He brought the sword to the Gruagach and, as his wife warned him to, stabbed him to death in a mole.

He came home to find a giant had stolen his wife and the two horses. He set out in search and met a cu seang, a wild dog. They greeted each other and the dog gave him meat. He thought he should go home, having no way to recover his wife and horses. The dog encouraged him and sent him on, promising to aid him. The next nights, he met a falcon and an otter as well, who did the same. Then he found a cave where his wife and the two horses were. She wept; he complained that he had journeyed hard to find her. The horses told her to hide him before them all.

The giant returned and the wife persuaded him that no one had come. He went to feed the horses, and they would not let him come near. He said if he had his soul in his body, they would have killed him. She asked where it was; he told her in the Bonnach stone, near the edge. When he left the next day, she pushed it so it was steady on the ledge, and told him she was afraid it would be hurt. He said his soul was in the threshold. She cleaned it, because his soul was in it, and he told her that a stone was under the threshold, and a sheep under it. The sheep held a duck, the duck held an egg, and the egg held his soul.

The king and queen moved the threshold and the stone. The sheep escaped, and the king called on the dog to catch it; the duck escaped, and the king called on the falcon to catch it; the egg rolled into the river, and the king called on the otter to retrieve it. The queen crushed it, killing the giant. They went home with the giant's gold and silver, visiting the otter, the falcon, and the dog on the way.

== See also ==
- The Death of Koschei the Deathless
- The Dragon and the Prince
- The Flower Queen's Daughter
- The Giant Who Had No Heart in His Body
- The Sea-Maiden
- The Three Daughters of King O'Hara
- What Came of Picking Flowers
