= What Came of Picking Flowers =

Portuguese fairy tale

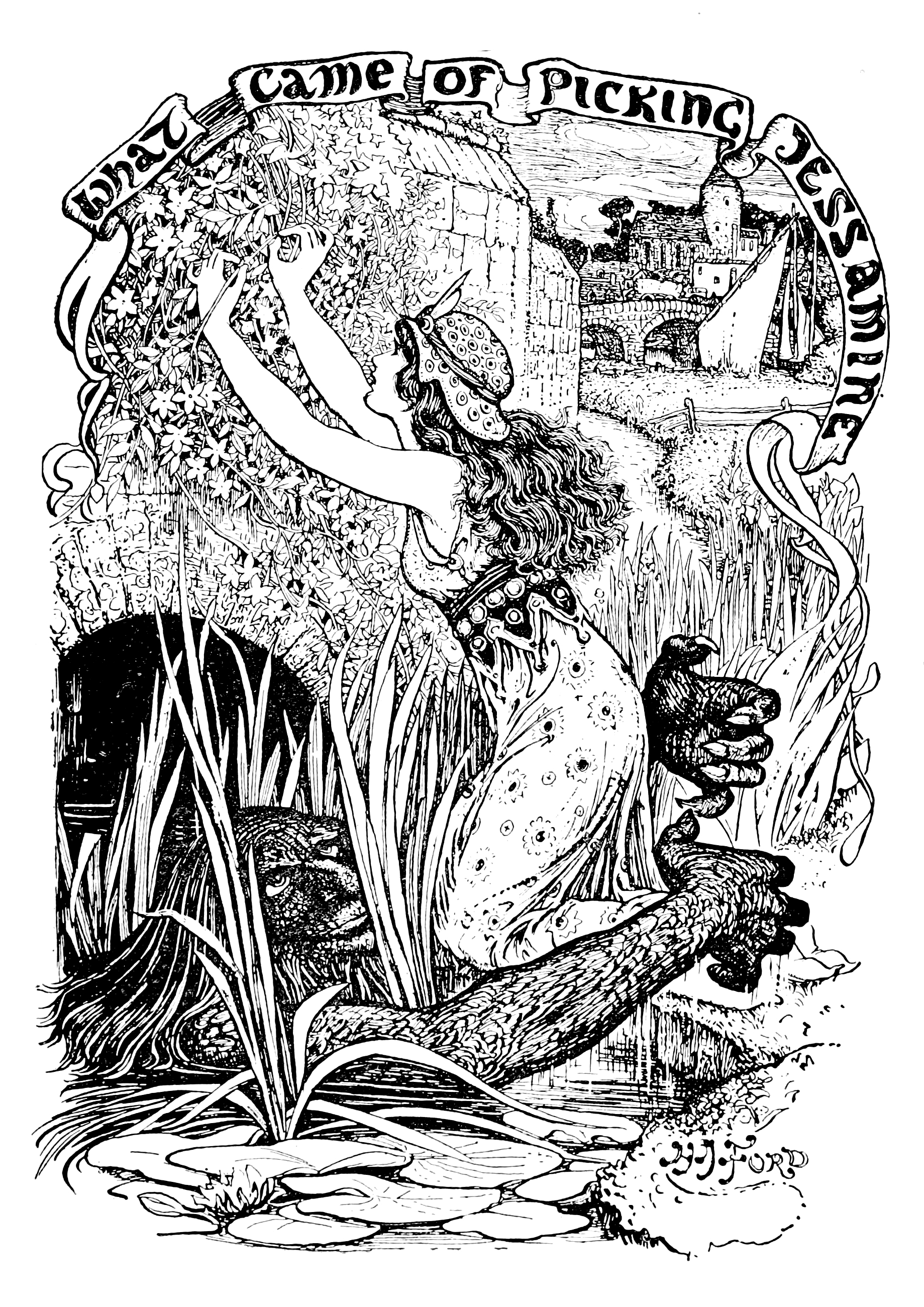
H. J. Ford - What came of picking jessamine

What came of picking Flowers is a Portuguese fairy tale first collected by Teophilo Braga with the name Cravo, Rosa e Jasmin. Andrew Lang included it in The Grey Fairy Book.

== Synopsis ==
A woman had a young son and three daughters. One day, one picked a pink carnation and vanished. The next day, the second, searching for her sister, picked a rose and vanished. The third day, the third picked some jessamine and vanished. The woman bewailed this so long that her son, just a boy when his sisters vanished, grew up to be a man. He asked what had happened, and his mother told him of his sisters. He asked for her blessing and set out to find them.

He found three big boys fighting over their inheritance: boots with which the wearer could wish himself anywhere, a key that opened every lock, and an invisibility cap. The son said he would throw a stone and whoever got it first would have all three. He threw it and stole the things, wishing himself where his oldest sister was. He found himself before a strong castle on a mountain. His key unlocked all the doors. He found his sister richly dressed, and having only one unhappiness: her husband was under a curse until a man who could not die, died. Her husband returned; the son put on his cap, and a bird flew in and became a man. He was angry that she had hidden someone from him, but the son took off his cap, and their resemblance convinced him that they were indeed brother and sister. He gave him a feather that would let him call on him, the King of the Birds.

The next day, he saw his second sister, whose only trouble was the spell that kept her husband half his day a fish. Her husband, the king of the fish, gave him a scale to call on him.

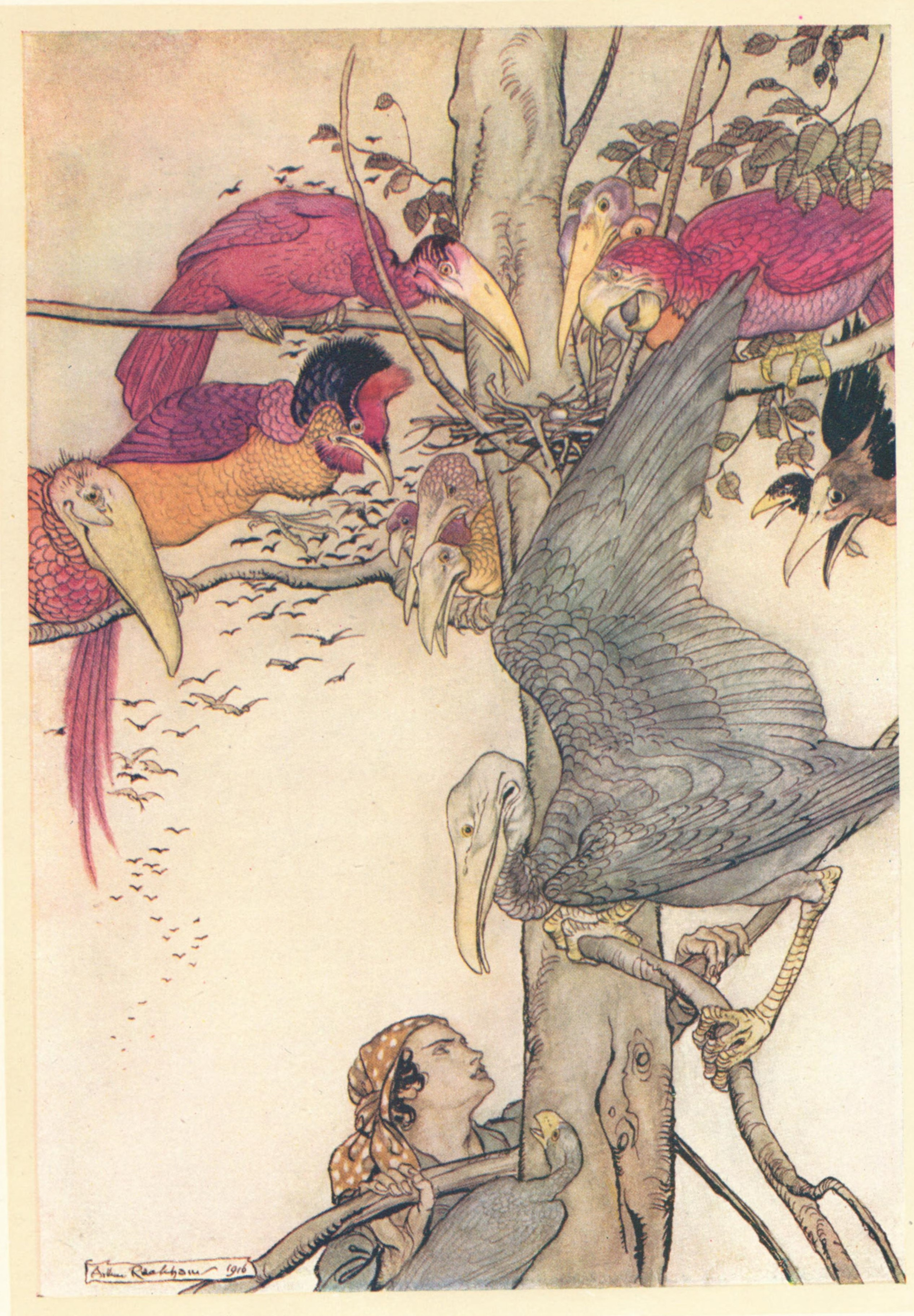
Illustration by Arthur Rackham, from The Allies Fairy Book from 1916. The birds show the young man the white dove's nest.

The next day, he saw his youngest sister, who had been carried off by a monster, and was weeping and thin from its cruelty, because she had refused to marry it. Her brother asked her to say she would marry it, if it told her how it could die. When she did, it told her that an iron casket at the bottom of the sea, had a white dove, and the dove's egg, dashed against its head, would kill it. The brother had the king of the fishes bring him the box, used the key to open it, had the king of the birds bring him the dove after it flew off, and carried off the egg. The youngest sister asked the monster to lay its head in her lap. Her brother smashed the egg on its head, and it died.

His two brothers-in-law resumed their shape, and they sent for their mother-in-law. The treasures of the monster made the youngest sister rich all her life.

== Translations ==
Andrew Lang included the tale as part of his fairy tale compilation of color Fairy Books, in The Grey Fairy Book.

The tale was included in The Allies Fairy Book (1916), with illustrations by Arthur Rackham.

== Analysis ==
This Portuguese tale shares similarities with Italian literary tale The Three Enchanted Princes, in which a king is forced to surrender his elder daughters to three animals that are princes under a curse.

== See also ==
- The Death of Koschei the Deathless
- The Dragon and the Prince
- The Fair Fiorita
- The Giant Who Had No Heart in His Body
- The Raven
- The Sea-Maiden
- The Three Daughters of King O'Hara
- The Three Enchanted Princes
- The Three Princesses of Whiteland
- The Young King Of Easaidh Ruadh
