= The Sea-Maiden =

Scottish fairy tale

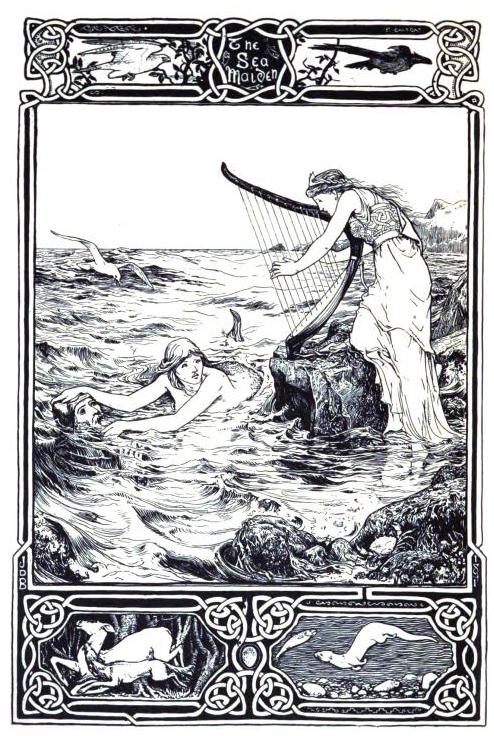
- The princess barters with the sea-maiden for her husband's release. Frontispice to Celtic Fairy Tales (by John D. Batten).

Folk tale
- Name: The Sea-Maiden
- Aarne–Thompson grouping: ATU 316 + ATU 303 + ATU 302
- Country: Scotland
- Published in: Popular Tales of the West Highlands
- Related: The Knights of the Fish; The Mermaid and the Boy

"The Sea-Maiden" (Scottish Gaelic: A Mhaighdean Mhara) is a Scottish fairy tale collected by John Francis Campbell in Popular Tales of the West Highlands, listing his informant as John Mackenzie, fisherman, near Inverary. Joseph Jacobs included it in Celtic Fairy Tales.

== Translations ==
Campbell's tale was translated into German language as Die Seejungfrau ("The Sea-Maiden") by translator Anna Kellner.

== Synopsis ==
A mermaid offered a fisherman much fish in return for his son. He said he had none. In Campbells' version, she offered him grains: three for his wife, three for a mare, three for a dog, three to plant in the yard; then there would be three sons, three foals, three puppies, and three trees, and she should have one son when he was three. In Jacobs's version, she merely said he would have a son, and when the boy was twenty, she would take him.

In Campbell's version, the mermaid let him put her off until the boy was twenty.

In both, the father grew troubled. The son (or oldest son) wormed the problem out of him, and told him to get him a good sword. He set out on horseback, with a dog, and came to where a dog, a falcon, and an otter quarreled over a sheep carcass. He split it up for them if they came with him and aided him.

He took service with a king, as a cowherd, and his pay was according to the milk. Nearby, the grass was poor, and so were the milk and his wages, but he found a green valley. When he pastured the cows there, a giant challenged him for grazing in his valley. He killed the giant. Taking none of its treasure, he took back the cows, which gave good milk. The next day, he took the cows further and had to fight another giant, with help from the dog. The third day after that, he took them still further and met a hag who tried to trick him, but he killed her with the help of the dog.

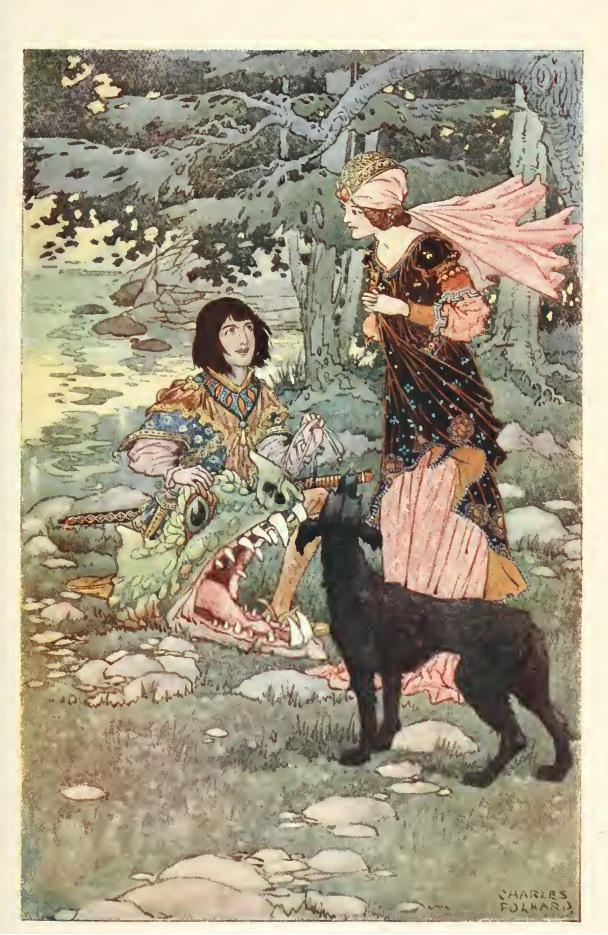
The princess congratulates the man for killing the dragon. Artwork by Charles Folkard for British fairy and folk tales (1920).

When he went back, everyone was lamenting. A monster with three heads lived in the loch, and got someone every year; this year the lot had fallen to the king's daughter. The general said he would rescue her, and the king had promised to marry him to the daughter if he did. The son went to see. When the monster appeared, the general ran off. The princess saw a doughty man on a black horse, with a black dog, appear. He fought the creature and had off one head, drawing a withy through it. He gave it the princess, who gave him a ring. He went back to his cows, and the general threatened to kill her if she did not say that he did it. The next day, the king's daughter had to go back, because there were two heads left. The son came again and slept, telling her to rouse him when the creature came; she did, putting an earring of hers on his ear as he said, and they fought, and he cut off the second head. The same thing happened the third time, and the creature died.

The king sent for the priest to marry his daughter to the general. The king's daughter said that first he must take the heads from the withy. He could not. Finally, the cowherd did. The king's daughter said the actual killer had her ring and two earrings, and he produced them. The king, displeased, ordered him better dressed; the king's daughter said he had good clothing, and he dressed in golden clothing from the giant's castle to marry her.

One day they walked by the loch, and the sea-maiden took the prince. The princess was advised by an old smith to wear her jewelry and offered it to the sea-maiden for the prince, in Campbell's variant, which she agreed to, or by a soothsayer to play music and not stop until the sea-maiden gave her a sight of the prince, which let the prince call on the falcon and escape.

But the princess was captured.

The same person who advised the prince told him that on an island, there was a white deer. If it were caught, a hoodie crow would jump from it; if it were captured, a trout would spring from it, but there would be an egg in the trout's mouth, and if it were broken, the sea-maiden would die.

The sea-maiden sank any boat that came to the island, but his horse and dog jumped to it. The dog chased the deer. The prince called on the dog from the sheep carcass, and with its aid, caught it. The hoodie sprang out, and with the falcon from the carcass, he caught it. The trout sprang out, and with the aid of the otter from the carcass, he caught it. The sea-maiden told him she would do what he asked if he would spare her. He demanded his wife. When she gave her back, he squeezed the egg and killed her.

=== Campbell's version ===
In Campbell's version, after the sea-maiden's external life is destroyed and it dies, the princess and her husband are walking one day, when the man notices a castle in the distance, in the woods. Curious about the place, he asks the princess if any one dwells there, but the princess warns him against going there. Despite her objections, the man goes to the castle in the woods and meets a crone by the entrance. She recognizes him as a fisherman's son and bids him enter first. As soon as he enters, she takes out a Slachdan druidhach, which she uses on him (in another translation, the witch knocks him out with a blow) and he falls.

The princess weeps for her missing husband. Back to the fisherman's hut, the tree that represents his elder son's life withers, so the fisherman's second son goes to the princess's kingdom. He is also informed of the castle in the woods and goes to check there himself. He meets the same crone, who uses the Slachdan druidhach on him, and he also falls.

At last, the fisherman's youngest son sees that the middle son's tree also withers, and follows the same road to the king's castle. Once there, the youngest learns of the black castle in the woods. He also goes there and meets the same crone. He draws his sword and beheads her, but the sword falls out of his hands, and the crone places her head on its place. The youngest brother's dog attacks the crone, but she uses her "club of magic" on the animal. The youngest brother struggles with the witch, takes her Slachdan druidhach and uses it on her. The crone dies at once. He finds the bodies of his elder brothers and uses the club on both to revive them. They gather the crone's gold and silver as spoils and go back to the king's palace. The elder son remains with the princess, while his brothers return to their father's house.

== Analysis ==
=== Tale type ===
According to scholars, the story is a combination of three tale types of the international Aarne-Thompson-Uther Index: ATU 316, "The Nix in the Mill Pond"; ATU 303, "The Twins or Blood Brothers", and ATU 302, "The Ogre's (Devil's) Heart in the Egg". In tale type ATU 303, a childless couple is given a birth implement (usually a fish), which allows for the birth of twins or triplets. Whatever remains of this implement is given to a mare and a she-dog, and buried in the garden. Accordingly, the mare and the she-dog give birth to a brood of the same number as the twins, and trees or bushes sprout in the garden (which will serve as the brothers' life token).

In an article in Enzyklopädie des Märchens, narrative researcher Ines Köhler-Zülch stated that type ATU 316 can be "contaminated" with type ATU 302, "Ogre's (Devil's) Life in an Egg". Similarly, in his 2004 revision of the index, German folklorist Hans-Jörg Uther noted that type 316 combined with type 302.

=== Motifs ===
The story includes the "rash promise" motif.

== Variants ==
=== Ireland ===
In an Irish tale from County Cork titled Tom Fisher and John Fisher, a fisherman's daughter catches a big fish into her boat. The fish becomes a man and marries her. They have twin boys, one named Tom Fisher and the other John Fisher. Years later, Tom Fisher declares he wants to look for his missing father. On the road, he gives food to three foxes (the Fox of the Long Gate, the Fox of the Red Gate, and the Fox of the Green Wood). Tom Fisher reaches a kingdom that is threatened by a serpent from the sea that demands one of the king's daughters as sacrifice every year. He rescues the princess and marries her. Later, he follows a mysterious hare with a golden chain around its neck to the woods and loses his way. He builds a hut and is visited by a witch (the true form of the hare), who turns him into a blue stone with a stick. Back to John Fisher, he notices that his brother is in danger (his token of life, a knife, has rusted), and goes to the princess's kingdom. John Fisher follows the same hare and meets the same witch. John Fisher threatens her, but the witch begs to be spared in exchange for providing the means to rescue the twins' father: the brothers are to find a bull in the king's stables, find a duck inside it, and an egg inside the duck (the egg holds the life of the mermaid that is holding their father hostage). The witch restores Tom Fisher to life and he kills her. Now back to the kingdom, the elder twin, Tom Fisher, summons his helpful foxes to kill the bull, so they can use the mermaid's egg as a bargaining chip. Tom goes to the sea shore and summons the mermaid, demanding his father's return, otherwise he will crush the egg. The mermaid releases the twins' father, and Tom throws the egg at the mermaid, vanquishing her once and for all. Tom sends for his mother and grandfather to live in his kingdom.

=== Canada ===
Author John Shaw published a similar tale, collected in Cape Breton, with the title Mac an Iasgair Mhóir (The Big Fisherman's Son). In this tale, a man named Big Fisherman has no luck catching fish, until one day a mermaid "or some other creature" comes out of the water with an offer: he will deliver her his first son in exchange for a plentiful net of fishes. Despite some reservations, the man agrees and is given three grains to give to wife, his she-dog and his mare. Within three years, each gives birth to three sons, three puppies and three foals. After delaying their meeting for 11 years, Big Fisherman's eldest son decides to meet the mermaid he was promised to. The elder goes to work as a cowherd in another kingdom, fights three giants, and later rescues a princess from a multi-headed sea monster. Later, he finds the mermaid's soul and breaks it, thus releasing himself from the creature's promise. This tale was classified by the compiler as a combination of types: ATU 300, "The Dragon-Slayer"; ATU 302, "Ogre's Life in an Egg"; ATU 303, "The Twins or Blood Brothers"; ATU 314A, "The Shepherd and the Giants", and ATU 316, "The Nix in the Mill Pond".

=== United States ===
American folklorist Marie Campbell collected an American variant from an informant named Uncle Blessing. In his tale, titled The Witch From the Ocean Waters, a man goes to the "ocean waters" to fish, but cannot catch any, until one day, a witch rises from the waters and promises to give him plenty, in exchange for the man's son. However, the man has no children, so the witch gives him some grains, for him to give to his wife, to his mare and to his she-dog. After some time, the man's wife gives birth to three sons, the mare to three foals, the she-dog to three puppies, and three trees sprout in the garden. After three years, the witch appears to get her end of the bargain, but the man manages to delay it for another seven years. Time passes, and the first son decides to leave home. So he finds himself a sword and departs with a dog (one of the puppies) as his companion. The boy finds work as a king's shepherd, fights three giants, one one-headed, the second three-headed and the last nine-headed, and eventually rescues and marries a princess. The narrator ends the story at the marriage to the princess, but refers to a continuation about the adventures of the two brothers and "how the trees withered". Campbell classified the tale as types 316 (first part) and 300, "The Dragon-Slayer".

== Adaptations ==
English novelist Alan Garner adapted the tale as The Seawife and the Crone, in his book Alan Garner's Book of British fairy tales. His version keeps the second part of the original tale, with the episode of a witch petrifying the hero and his middle brother, and both being saved by their cadet.

== See also ==
- Fair, Brown and Trembling
- The Dragon and the Prince
- The Giant Who Had No Heart in His Body
- The Merchant
- The Mermaid and the Boy
- The Nixie of the Mill-Pond
- The Thirteenth Son of the King of Erin
- The Three Daughters of King O'Hara
- The Young King Of Easaidh Ruadh
- What Came of Picking Flowers
