= The Dragon and the Prince =

Serbian fairy tale

The Dragon and the Prince or The Prince and the Dragon is a Serbian fairy tale collected by A. H. Wratislaw in his Sixty Folk-Tales from Exclusively Slavonic Sources, tale number 43. Andrew Lang included it in The Crimson Fairy Book.

Ruth Manning-Sanders included it, as "The Prince and the Dragons", in A Book of Princes and Princesses.

== Synopsis ==
An emperor had three sons. The oldest went hunting and chased a hare; when it fled into a water-mill and he followed, it turned into a dragon and ate him. The same thing happened to the second.

When the youngest set out, he chased the hare but did not go into the water-mill. Instead, he searched for other game. When he got back to the mill, only an old woman sat there. She told him of the dragon. He asked her to ask the dragon the secret of its strength, and whenever it told her, to kiss the place that it mentioned. He left. When the dragon returned, the old woman did ask it; when it told her the fireplace, she began to kiss it, and it laughed and said it was the tree in front of the house; when she began to kiss that, it told her that a distant empire had a lake, which held a dragon, which held a boar, which held a pigeon, which held its strength.

The prince set out and found the empire. He took service as a shepherd with the emperor, who warned him not to go near the lake, though the sheep would go there if allowed. He set out with the sheep, two hounds, a falcon, and a pair of bagpipes, and let the sheep go to the lake at once. He challenged the dragon and it came out of the lake. They fought together, and the dragon asked him to let it face its face in the lake. He refused, and said if the emperor's daughter were there to kiss him, he would toss it into the air. The dragon broke off from the fight. The next day, the same happened, but the emperor had sent two groom to follow him, and they reported what had happened. The third day, the emperor sent his daughter to the lake, with directions to kiss him when he said that. They fought as before, but the emperor's daughter did kiss him, he threw the dragon into the air, and it burst when it hit the ground. A boar burst out of it, but he caught it with the dogs; a pigeon burst out of it, but he caught it with the falcon. The pigeon told him that behind the water mill, three wands grew, and if he cut them and struck their root, he would find a prison filled with people. He wrung the pigeon's neck.

The emperor married him to his daughter. After the wedding feast, they went back and freed all the dragon's prisoners.

== See also ==
- The Giant Who Had No Heart in His Body
- The Sea-Maiden
- The Three Daughters of King O'Hara
- The Young King Of Easaidh Ruadh
- What Came of Picking Flowers
