= The Three Enchanted Princes =

Italian fairy tale

The Three Enchanted Princes or The Three Animal Kings (Neapolitan: Li tre rri anemale; Italian: I tre re animale) is an Italian literary fairy tale written by Giambattista Basile in his 1634 work, the Pentamerone. It is Aarne–Thompson–Uther Index ATU 552, "The Girls who married animals". At the end of the tale, the prince's brothers-in-law help him in defeating the dragon (or sorcerer, or ogre).

== Synopsis ==
The king of Green Bank had three beautiful daughters. The king of Fair Meadows had three sons, who had been transformed into a falcon, a stag, and a dolphin; these sons loved the three daughters, but the king would not marry them to animals. The sons summoned all the animals of their kind and made war until the king yielded. They were married, and the queen gave each of her daughters a ring so they could recognize one another.

After the wedding, the queen gave birth to a son, Tittone. One day, she lamented that she never heard what happened to her daughters. Tittone set out to find them. He found the eldest with the falcon husband; she hid him and persuaded her husband to let him visit. He stayed for a time, and the falcon gave him a feather when he set out to find the other sisters. After a time, he found the second sister, and her husband the stag made him feel welcome, and when he left, gave him some of its hair. He found the third sister, and her husband the dolphin made him feel welcome and gave him some scales when he left.

Returning, he found a maiden captive in a tower, where a dragon slept, and which was surrounded by a lake. She begged him to save her. He threw down the feather, hairs, and scales, and his brothers-in-law appeared. The falcon summoned griffins to carry her to freedom; when the dragon woke, the stag summoned lions, bears, and other animals to tear it to pieces; the dolphin had waves engulf the tower to destroy it. This freed the brothers-in-law from their enchanted shapes, and they returned with their brides to their own parents, and Tittone returned to his with his bride.

== Translations ==
The tale was translated into English language as King Falcon, King Dolphin, and King Stag and published in The Italian Fairy Book. Another translation of the tale was given as The Three Brother Beasts, in The Golden Fairy Book.

== Analysis ==
=== Fate of the sisters ===
There are variants where the girls' father is the one that gives away the daughters to the animals, and their brother, born years later, goes after them. In other variants, the princesses and the prince are born in the same generation, and it is the brother who weds his sisters to the animals.

=== The animal suitors ===
The second variation lies in the brothers-in-law: usually, there are three animals, one terrestrial, a second aerial and the third aquatic, as in Musäus's version (respectively, a bear, a falcon and a giant fish). In the famous Russian version Marya Morevna, the husbands-to-be are a falcon, an eagle and a raven. In Czech fairy tale film The Prince and the Evening Star, the prince marries his sisters to the Sun, the Moon and the Wind, who are princes or kings, as per the original tale by author Bozena Nemcova.

Richard MacGillivray Dawkins also noted that in some variants, the suitors are "persons of great and magical potency", but appear to court the princesses under shaggy and ragged disguises. In the same vein, author Italo Calvino, commenting on an Italian variant he adapted, remarked that "in three similar Southern [Italian] versions", the brothers-in-law hold dominion over animals.

Russian folklorist Alexander Afanasyev, based on comparative analysis of Slavic folkloric traditions, stated that the eagle, the falcon and the raven (or crow), in Slavic versions, are connected to weather phenomena, like storm, rain, wind. He also saw a parallel between the avian suitors from the tale Marya Morevna with the suitors from other Slavic folktales, where they are the Sun, the Moon, the Thunder and the Wind.

In a comparative study, Karelian scholarship noted that, in Russian variants, there are three brothers-in-law, the most common are three ornitomorphic characters: the eagle (named Orel Orlovich), the falcon (named Sokol Sokolovich) and the raven (almost always the third suitor, called Voron Voronovich). They may sometimes be replaced - depending on the location - by another bird (a dove or a magpie) or by a mammal (a bear, wolf, seal or deer).

=== Other motifs ===
Professor Karel Horálek mentioned that tale type AaTh 552 ("specially in Slavic variants") shows the motif of the hero opening, against his wife's orders, a door or the dungeon and liberating a Giant or Ogre that kills him.

=== Origins ===
W. R. Halliday attempted a reconstruction of the supposedly original form of the tale, dubbed "The Magic Brothers-in-law", which incorporates the marriage to animals or other creatures, and the fight against an adversary whose soul is located outside his body ("Ogre's life in an egg"). Professor Susie Hoogasian-Villa seemed to concur that Halliday's reconstruction is the original form.

On the other hand, it has been suggested that the tale type ATU 552 may have been derived from an original form that closely resembles ATU 554, "The Grateful Animals". In this transition, the animals helpers have changed into brothers-in-law. Linguist Jiri Polívka reached a similar conclusion in his work about Slovak fairy tales. He argued that in the cycle of stories where a princess is kidnapped by a monster released by her husband, the motif of the grateful animals merged with the motif of the enchanted brothers-in-law.

== Variants ==
Professor Stith Thompson commented that, apart from two ancient literary versions (Musäus and Giambattista Basile), the tale is also widespread all over Europe. W. R. Halliday suggested the tale is "characteristic of the Balkan states and the Near East".

=== Europe ===
==== Western Europe ====
===== Ireland =====
Jeremiah Curtin collected an Irish variant titled The Weaver's Son and the Giant of the White Hill, where a poor family "sells" their daughters to three noblemen for "their price in gold/silver/copper". Years later, their youngest brother visits each of the sisters and is given "a bit of wool from the ram, a bit of fin from the salmon, and a feather from the eagle".

===== France =====
French historian Robert Darnton cites, in his book The Great Cat Massacre, a burlesque narrative of a peasant couple marrying their daughters off to a wolf, a fox, a hare and a pig.

A variant from Brittany was collected by Paul Sébillot, titled Le Château suspendu dans les airs (English: "The Castle that hangs in the air"). The brothers-in-law are the King of the Birds, King of the Fishes and King of the Rats and Mice.

===== Germany =====
German author Johann Karl August Musäus wrote a literary treatment of the tale type in his Volksmärchen der Deutschen, with the title Die Bücher der Chronika der drei Schwestern ("The Book of the Chronicles of the Three Sisters"). This version has been translated into English several times, including as The Chronicles of the Three Sisters, Reinald, the Wonder-Child, or The Chronicles of the Three Sisters and The Enchanted Forest.

19th century theologue Johann Andreas Christian Löhr wrote a version of the tale, titled Reinhald das Wunderkind, where the sisters are called Wulfheid, Adelheid and Bertha, married, respectively, to a bear, an "Aar" (a dated or poetic German word for eagle) and a giant fish (called a behemoth by the father).

The Brothers Grimm collected, in the very first edition of their Kinder- und Hausmärchen (1812) the tale Die drei Schwestern ("The Three Sisters"), where the maidens are betrothed to a bear, an eagle and a generic fish due to their father's gambling. The tale, previously KHM 82, was later withdrawn from the collection.

Louis Curtze collected a variant from Dieringhausen, in Germany, titled Reinhold, das Wunderkind. The name is quite similar to the main character of Musäus's version, whose name was translated as "Rinaldo, the son of wonder".

Heinrich Pröhle collected the tale Bärenheid, Adelheid und Wallfild, the sisters' names, which mirror the animals they will be married to: respectively, Bären (English: "bear"), Adler (English: "eagle") and Wallfische (English: "whale").

Gustav F. Meyer published a version titled De dree verwünschenen Prinzen, in the 1909 edition of Heimat. Gustav Meyer referred, in his annotations, to Basile's, Musäus's and Grimm's versions.

Ernst Meier published a Swabian version titled Donner, Blitz und Wetter (English: "Thunder, Lightning and Weather"). Meier interpreted the characters of the meteorological phenomena as probably the remnants of ancient deities.

==== Southern Europe ====
===== Portugal =====
There are two Portuguese variants: What Came of Picking Flowers (Cravo, Rosa e Jasmim), by Teophilo Braga, where the animals are the king of birds and the king of fishes, and A Torre da Babylonia, by Adolpho Coelho, where the brothers-in-law are the king of fishes, the king of "leões do mar" (sea lions) and the king of birds.

===== Italy =====
Calvino stated that "the three kings of animal realms" as brothers-in-law is a "widespread Italian folk motif".

Apart from Basile's literary work, the tale is attested in Italian folktale compilations, with seven variants (AT 552 and AT 552A), according to a 20th-century inquiry, Other variants were collected by 19th century folklorists: "The Fair Fiorita" (La bella Fiorita), by Domenico Comparetti; Lu re di li setti muntagni d'oru and Li tri figghi obbidienti by Giuseppe Pitrè; Von der schönen Cardia, by Laura Gonzenbach; Lu Bbastunélle, by Gennaro Finnamore; La bella del Mondo, by Antonio de Nino; Die vier Königskinder, by Hermann Knust.

In De Nino's version, the sisters are married to the "Vento Maggiore", the sirocco and the sun, while in Gonzenbach's they are married to the king of ravens, the king of "the wild animals" and the king of birds. In another variant, titled La Bella di Setti Veli, collected by Letterio Di Francia, a queen has three daughters that are married to the sun, the wind and the mist.

Pitrè also provided a summary of another variant from Cianciana, titled La bella Maiurana. In this tale, a king with three daughters and a son weds the princesses to the three sons of a wizard. The prince breaks an old woman's jug and she curses him to seek Maiurana as his bride. He visits his sisters and brothers-in-law and learns that Maiurana is at the mercy of their magician father and his ogre wife.

In a variant Calvino adapted, The Princesses Wed to the First Passers-by, the prince marries his sisters to three simple men: a pigherd, a fowler and a gravedigger. Later, when the prince is cursed to look for a beautiful maiden named Floret, he visits his sisters and discovers that his brothers-in-law have power, respectively, over pigs, birds and the dead.

==== Denmark ====
Svend Grundtvig collected a Danish variant titled The Wishing-Box (Ønskedaasen): Hans, the son of a poor peasant, receives from his father a wishing-box his father was given by a sorcerer, in exchange for Hans's older sisters. The wishing-box contains a magical being that must serve the owner of the box. In his journeys, he meets his sisters' husbands: three princes cursed into animal forms (wild bear, eagle and fish).

==== Baltic region ====
===== Lithuania =====
August Leskien collected a variant in Lithuania ("Von dem Königssohn, der auszog, um seine drei Schwestern zu suchen"), where the animals are a falcon, a griffin and an eagle. After their marriages to the hero's sisters, the avian brothers-in-law gather to find a bride for him. They tell of a maiden the hero must defeat in combat before he marries her. He does, and, after the hero and the warrior maiden marry, she gives him a set of keys. The hero uses the keys to open a chamber in her castle and releases an enemy king.

In another variant, collected by Carl Cappeller with the title Kaiser Ohneseele ("King With-no-Soul"), the protagonist weds his three sisters to the bird griffin, an eagle, and the king of nightingales. The tale continues as his brothers-in-law help him to rescue his beloved princess, captured by Kaiser Ohneseele.

===== Latvia =====
In a Latvian variant, Die Tiere als Schwiegersöhne or "Животные-зятья" ("Animal Sons-in-Law"), an old man lives with his three daughters. One day, heavy rain starts to pour down, and a giant gold fish appears to claim one of his daughters as spouse. Next, a great storm rages on, and an eagle comes to take one of the girls as his wife. Lastly, a darkness covers the forest, and a bear appears to take the last daughter. In return, the old man receives three golden scales, three feathers and three hairs. The old man visits his daughters and their husbands, and works with his sons-in-law to disenchant them by finding the external soul of the devil that cursed them.

In another Latvian tale, sourced as from the collection of Latvian lawyer Arveds Švābe (lv), "Три сестры, брат да яйцо бессмертия" ("Three Sisters, A Brother, and the Egg of Immortality"), a dying king begs his only son to look after his three sisters. One day, while they are strolling in the garden, the three princess vanish with a strong gust of wind. Their brother goes after them, and, on the way, helps a hare, a wolf, a crab, a nest of wasps, mosquitoes and an eagle. He reaches three witches who live in houses that gyrate on chicken legs. He learns from them that his sisters are now married to a pike, an eagle and a bear, each of whom are cursed princes, and that to reach them, he must first seek an equine mount by taking up work with a witch. After he works with the witch, he flies on the horse to each of his sisters, and confirms the princes' story: they are brothers who were cursed by a dragon whose life lies outside his body. Vowing to break their curse, the prince flies to the dragon's palace, and meets a princess - the dragon's prisoner.

===== Estonia =====
The tale type ATU 552 is known in Estonia as Loomad kälimeesteks ("Animals as Sisters' Husbands"), and the suitors appear as the kings of animals: a lion, an eagle and a snake.

==== Central Europe ====
In a tale from Drava, Az acélember ("The Man of Steel"), a father's dying wishes is for his brothers to marry off their sisters to anyone who passes by. The first to pass is the eagle king, the second the falcon king and the third the buzzard king. On their way to their sisters, they camp out in the woods. While his elder brothers are sleeping, the youngest kills the dragons that emerge from the lake. Later, he meets giants who want to kidnap a princess. The youth tricks them and decapitates their heads. His brothers wake up and go to the neighbouring castle. The king learns of the youth's bravery and rewards him with his daughter's hand in marriage. The king also gives him a set of keys and tells his son-in-law never to open the ninth door. He does and releases "The Steel Man", who kidnaps his wife as soon as she leaves the emperor's church. In the last part of the tale, with the help of his avian brothers-in-law, he finds the Steel Man's strength: inside a butterfly, inside a bird, inside a fox.

==== Eastern Europe ====
In The Story of Argilius and the Flame-King, the King and Queen wish to marry their three daughters to their only brother, to keep the kingdom intact. Prince Argilius (hu), in defiance of their parents' wishes, marries his sisters to the Sun-king, the Wind-king and the Moon-king. The prince then journeys to find his own bride, Kavadiska. They marry and his wife warns not to open the last chamber in their castle while she is away. Argilius disobeys and releases Holofernes, the Flame-King. The translation indicated a "Slavonic" origin. However, W. Henry Jones, in his notes to a book of Magyar folktales by Janos Kriza, gave a summary of the original tale, Zauberhelene, and pointed as its primary source a collection of Hungarian fairy tales by Count Máilath.

The Norwegian translation of the tale, Trold-Helene, gave the brothers-in-law's names as Solkongen (Sun-King), Stormkongen (Storm-King) and Maanekongen (Moon-King).

===== Russia =====
The most representative version of the tale type ATU 552 is Marya Morevna, or its variant The Three Sons-in-Law. In the latter tale, the hero Ivan marries his three sisters to an eagle, a falcon and another man, then goes to find Marya Morevnva, "The Princess with the Pouch". He opens the forbidden door to the castle and releases Kaschei the Immortal, who kidnaps his wife. Ivan summons his fiery horse "Sivko-Burko" and visits his sisters. When Ivan reaches Kaschei's lair, Marya Morevna obtains a valuable information: the location of Kaschei's external soul. She also finds out that the villain's magical horse he obtained from herding Yega Yegishna's twelve mares, in her abode across a fiery river.

Apart from the story about Koschei, the Deathless and Marya Morevna (both present in the same variant), Russian folktale compilations attest similar tales about human maidens marrying either animals or personifications of nature (sun, wind, storm, etc.). For instance, the tale The Sun, The Moon and Crow Crowson or Sun, Moon and Raven Ravenson, classified as type 552B.

In another variant by Alexander Afanasyev, Fedor Tugarin and Anastasia the Beautiful, prince Fedor Tugarin weds his sisters to the wind, the hail and the thunder. Alexander Afanasyev saw a parallel between versions where the raven or crow is the last suitor and variants where it is the wind, and suggested that they both were equated.

Another tale was compiled by author A. A. Erlenwein, which was translated by Angelo de Gubernatis in his Florilegio with the name Vaniúsha, where the sisters marry a bear, an iron-nosed bird ("uccello dal naso di ferro") and a pike ("luccio"). The "bird with iron beak" appears to be a creature that inhabits several Slavic folktales.

Russian folklorist Alexander Afanasyev mentioned the existence of an old Russian tale titled "Сказку об Иване Белом" (Skazky ov Ivanye Byelom; "The Tale of Ivan, the White"), where the prince weds his sisters to three magical suitors: the Thunder, the Rain and the Wind. They also help him by teaching Ivan magical abilities related to their elements, which allow the prince to command the destructive aspects of the rain, the thunder and the wind.

In another Russian variant, "Иванъ царевичъ и Марья Маревна" ("Ivan Tsarevich and Marya Marevna"), collected by Ivan Khudyakov (ru), the young Ivan Tsarevich takes his sisters for a walk in the garden, when, suddenly, three whirlwinds capture the ladies. Three years later, the Tsarevich intends to court princess Marya Morevna, when, in his travels, he finds three old men, who reveal themselves as the whirlwinds and assume an avian form (the first a raven, the second an eagle and the third a falcon). After a series of adventures, Ivan Tsarevich and Marya Moreva marry and she gives him a silver key and warns him never to open its respective door. He does so and finds a giant snake chained to the wall.

In a third Russian variant, "Анастасья Прекрасная и Иванъ Русский Богатырь" ("The Beautiful Anastasia and Ivan, the Russian Bogatyr"), collected by Ivan Khudyakov (ru), the father of Ivan, the Russian Bogatyr, orders him, as a last wish, to marry his sister off to whoever appears at the castle. Three people appear and requests Ivan to deliver them his sisters. Some time later, Ivan sees that three armies have been defeated by a warrior queen named Marya Marevna. Ivan invades her white tent and they face in combat. Ivan defeats her and she reveals she is not Marya Marevna, but a princess named Anastasia, the Beautiful. They yield and marry. Anastasia gives him the keys to her castle and warns him never to open a certain door. He does and meets Koshey, prisoner of Anastasia's castle for 15 years. Ivan unwittingly helps the villain and he kidnaps his wife. The bogatyr, then, journeys through the world and visits his sisters, married to the Raven King, the Hawk King and the Eagle King. They advise him to find a mare that comes from the sea to vanquish Koschey.

Professor Jack V. Haney also translated a variant from storyteller Fedor Kabrenov (1895-?), from Pudozh. In this tale, titled Ivan Tsarevich and Koshchei the Deathless, the sisters of prince Ivan Tsarevich decide to take a walk "in the open steppe", when three strange storms appear and seize each one of the maidens. After he goes in search of his sisters, he discovers them married to three men equally named Raven Ravenson, Talon Talonson (albeit with different physical characteristics: one with "brass nose, lead tail", the second with "brass nose, cast iron tail", and the third with "golden nose, steel tail"). He tells them he wants to court Maria Tsarevna, the princess of a foreign land. He visits her court but is locked up in prison. He trades three magical objects for a night with Maria Tsarevna. They marry, and Ivan Tsarevich releases Koschei the Deathless from his captivity "with the press of a button". Ivan is killed, but his avian brothers-in-law resurrect him with the living and dead waters, and tell him to seek a magical colt from the stables of Koschei's mother.

===== Belarus =====
In a Belarusian variant (summarized by Slavicist Karel Horálek), "Прекрасная девица Алена" ("Beautiful Girl Alena"), one of the tsar's sons marries his sisters to the Thunder, the Frost and the Rain. On his wanderings, he learns the titular Beautiful Alena is his destined bride. They marry, he releases a dragon that kidnaps his wife and discovers the dragon's weakness lies within an egg inside a duck, inside a hare, inside an ox.

In a second variant from Belarus, "Иван Иванович—римский царевич" (also cited by Horálek), the hero, Ivan Tsarevich, marries his sisters to the Wind, the Storm and the King of the Birds. He also learns from an old woman of a beautiful warrior princess. He journeys to this warrior princess and wants to fight her (she is disguised as a man). They marry soon after. She gives him the keys to the castle and warns him never to enter a certain chamber. He opens it and releases a human-looking youth (the villain of the tale). The prince vanquishes this foe with the help of a horse.

In a Belarusian tale published by folklorist Lev Barag and translated as Janko und die Königstochter ("Janko and the King's Daughter"), a dying king makes his son, Janko, promise to marry his three sisters to whoever appears after he dies. Some time later, three man, Raven Ravenson, Eagle Eagleson and Zander Zanderson, come to take the princesses as wives. Later, Janko steals items from quarrelling peoples and visits his three sisters. He rides his horse to a king and courts its princess with the magical objects he stole from the three man. They marry and she gives him a set of keys, forbidding him to open a certain door. Janko does and releases a dragon who kidnaps his wife. The dragon warns that Janko has three tries (or "lifes") to follow him and try to regain his wife. After the third attempt, the dragon kills Janko. Janko's brothers-in-law find his corpse and restore him to life with the water of life and the water of death. Janko is advised by his brothers-in-law to find a horse from a witch, which he does by herding her horses. At last, Janko rides the horse into battle, and his horse convinces the dragon's mount - his brother - to drop the villain to the ground.

===== Czech Republic =====
In a Moravian tale, The Bear, the Eagle and the Fish, translated by Josef Baudis from a collection of folktales by František Elpl (O medvědu, orlu a rybě), a bankrupt count is forced to wed his daughters to a bear, an eagle and a fish. Years later, the ladies' brother visits them and gains three hairs from the bear, three feathers from the eagle and three fish scales as aid to defeat the magician who cursed the brothers-in-law into animal forms.

Author Božena Němcová collected a Czech fairy tale, O Slunečníku, Měsíčníku a Větrníku, where the prince's sisters are married to the Sun, the Moon and the Wind. A retelling of Nemcova's version, titled O slunečníkovi, měsíčníkovi a větrníkovi, named the prince Silomil, who marries the unnamed warrior princess and frees a king with magical powers from his wife's dungeon.

Czech writer Josef Košín z Radostova (cs) published the story of O medvědu, orlu a rybě ("About the bear, the eagle and the fish"): Prince Radoslav drowns in debt and is forced to relocate with his family to a cabin in the mountains. He meets a bear, an eagle and a fish and gives his three daughters to each one, receiving a hefty sum of money in exchange. Years later, prince Radoslav's wife gives birth to a son, Miloň, who swears to find his sisters.

In another Moravian tale, Černokněžník ("The Sorcerer"), an evil wizard tries to force a marriage to a king's daughter. After she refuses, the sorcerer casts a curse on her brothers: they shall become a bear, an eagle and a whale and their realms shall become, respectively, a forest, the rocks of a desert and a lake. Some time later, the neighbouring king is forced to marry his daughters to the animal princes. Years later, his youngest son vows to break the curse and save both kingdoms.

===== Slovenia =====
Author Bozena Nemcova also collected a very similar Slovenian variant of the Czech fairy tale, titled O Slunečníku, Měsíčníku, Větrníku, o krásné Ulianě a dvou tátošíkách. The princesses are married to the Sun, the Moon and the Wind, and prince journeys until he finds the beautiful warrior princess Uliane. They marry. Later, she gives him the keys to her castle and tells him not to open the thirteenth door. He disobeys her orders and opens the door: there he finds a giant serpent named Šarkan.

In another Slovenian tale, O třech zakletých knížatech ("About the three cursed princes"), the rich peasant loses his fortune in gambling and is forced to give his daughters to a bear, an eagle and a fish in order to gain some economic respite. Years later, a son is born to him and his wife, named Radovid. He visits his sisters and discovers that the bear, the eagle and the fish were once human princes, cursed into animal forms by an evil wizard. At the end of the tale, the hero defeats the wizard and rescues a princess (the princes' sister) from a coffin in the wizard's cave.

===== Slovakia =====
A rather lengthy Slovak version, Tri zakljate kňježatá ("The Three Enchanted Princes"), was collected by Slovak writer Ján Francisci-Rimavský (Johann Rimauski).

Another Slovak writer, Pavol Dobšinský, was reported to have collected another variant. In this variant, Tri zakliate kniežatá ("The Three Cursed Princes"), a king surrenders his daughters to a bear, an eagle and a fish. Years later, a prince is born to the king. He decides to visit his sisters and, after hearing the whole story of his cursed brothers-in-law, decides to rescue their sister, trapped in a deathlike state, from the clutches of the devil.

===== Croatia =====
Karel Jaromír Erben collected a Croatian variant titled Královic a Víla ("The Tsar's Son and the Víla"). In this tale, the Wind-King, the Sun-King and the Moon-King (in that order) wish to marry the tsar's daughters. After that, the Kralovic visits his brothers-in-law and is gifted a bottle of "water of death" and a bottle of "water of life". In his travels, Královic comes across a trench full of soldiers' heads. He uses the bottles on a head to discover what happened and learns it was the working of a Víla. Later, he meets the Víla and falls in love with her. They marry and she gives the keys to her palace and a warning: never to open the last door. Královic disobeys and meets a dangerous prisoner: král Oheň, the King of Fire, who escapes and captures Víla.

===== Serbia =====
In a Serbian variant, Bash Tchelik, or Real Steel, the prince accidentally releases Bash Tchelik from his prison, who kidnaps the prince's wife. He later travels to his sisters' kingdoms and discovers them married, respectively, to the king of dragons, the king of eagles and the king of falcons. The tale was translated into English, first collected by British author Elodie Lawton Mijatovich with the name Bash-Chalek, or, True Steel, and later as Steelpacha.

In another Serbian variant published by Serbian educator Atanasije Nikolić, Путник и црвени ветар or Der Wanderer und der Rote Wind ("The Wanderer and the Red Wind"), at their father's dying request, three brothers marry their three sisters to the first passers-by (in this case, three animals). The brothers then camp out in the woods and kill three dragons. The youngest finds a man in the woods rising the sun and moon with a ball of yarn. He finds a group of robbers who want to invade the tsar's palace. The prince goes on first, kills the robbers and saves a princess from a dragon. They marry and he opens a forbidden room where "The Red Wind" is imprisoned. The Red Wind kidnaps his wife and he goes after her, with the help of his animal brothers-in-law. Slavicist Karel Horálek indicated it was a variant of the Turkish tale Der Windteufel ("The Wind Devil").

In another tale, collected and published by Vuk Karadžić with the title Стојша и Младен ("Stojsa and Mladen), a pregnant queen sees her three older daughters carried away by a powerful whirlwind. The king, her husband, dies of a broken heart and she gives birth to a prince named Stojsa. When Stojsa is 18 years old, he asks his mother about any other sibling he has, and she explains the story. She also gives him three handkerchiefs sewn by his sisters in case he finds them. Stojsa discovers his sisters married to three dragons. He meets and allies himself with a fourth dragon named Mladen, turns the tables on the brothers-in-law, kills them and rescues his sisters. Croatian folklorist Maja Bošković-Stulli also classified the tale as type AaTh 552A.

Slavicist Karel Horálek also mentioned a variant from Serbia, titled "Атеш-Периша" ("Atesh-Perisha"), published in newspaper Босанска вила (sr) (Bosanska vila). This variant also begins as the Tierschwäger ("Animal Brothers-in-Law") tale type.

===== Udmurt people =====
In a tale from the Votyak (Udmurt people), collected by D. K. Zelenin and translated as The Grateful Animals by C. F. Coxwell, a man marries his three daughters to the chief of the birds, the chief of the wild beasts, and to the whirlwind, respectively. Some time later, their brother wanders about and helps a swarm of bees, a raven and an anthill on his way to his elder sister. His three brothers-in-law greet him and each gives him a horse.

===== Mari people =====
In a tale from the Mari people titled "Ивук" ("Ivuk"), in a certain village an old couple lives with his two beautiful daughters. One day, a stranger comes to court the elder. They are quite taken with one another and she vanishes overnight. The same thing happens to her sister. Years later, a boy named Ivuk is born to them. Ivuk decides to look for his two sisters. After tricking a group of demons, he gains some magical objects and teleports to the palace of Yorok Yorovich, who marries his sister Myra. He later visits Orel Orlovich, the lord of the birds, and his wife Anna, Ivuk's sister. Orel tells of a beautiful princess that lives in a Dark City, ruled by an evil sorceress queen. Both Orel and Yorok each give a strand of their hair to Ivuk to summon them, in case they need their help. Some time later, he defeats the sorceress queen and marries the princess. One day, he wanders through the forest and sees a huge rock with a door. He opens the door and a prisoner is chained inside. The prisoner begs Ivuk to give him deer meat. Ivuk obeys, the prisoner escapes, kills him and abducts his wife. Orel and Yorok appear and revive Ivuk with the water of death and the water of life, and tell him he must seek a wonderful horse that can defeat the prisoner's. The only place he can find one is in the stables of the witch. He can gain the horse if he herds the witch's horses for three days.

==== Romania ====
In the Romanian tale Crincu, az erdei vadász ("Crincu, the Forest Hunter"), Crincu's father orders him and his brothers to make a funeral pyre with 99 wooden carts and 99 straw carts. Crincu goes into the woods, meets personifications of the twilight, midnight and dawn and ties each of them with a rope to a tree, so that the day cannot complete the daily cycle. He then finds some giants who will lend him fire to torch the pyre, in exchange for his help in capturing the daughters of the Green King. Crincu enters the Green King's palace through the chimney, waits for the giants to appear and beheads them. The youth, then, takes the ring from the youngest's finger (still asleep) and returns to his brothers. The trio also marries their sisters to an eagle, a kestrel and a wolf, whom the narrative describes as táltos (a magician, a sorcerer or a shaman). The Green King learns of the deed and gives his daughters to Crincu and his brothers, but a creature named Pogány kills Crincu and takes his bride. The eagle brother-in-law resurrects him. Crincu then visits his sister, is armed with a magical horse and weapons and tries to rescue his bride, but is killed for his efforts. The second brother-in-law, the kestrel, helps him this time. Crincu tries again, but is killed a third time. The wolf brother-in-law brings him to life this time and advises him to seek a job with the one hundred year-old witch that lives in the depths of Hell and gain her horse in order to defeat Pogány once and for all. Crincu's brothers-in-law help him in the witch's tasks and she lets him choose a horse: the lamest one of the harras and the younger brother of Pogány's mount.

In another Romanian tale, Omul cu trei feciori ("A Man with three sons"), the hero's brothers-in-law are a "ciorilor" (a crow), a "corbilor" (a raven) and a "vulturilor" (a vulture or eagle).

==== Hungary ====
In the Hungarian variant A holló, medve és hal sógora, from a Csángo source, or Der Schwager von Rabe, Bär und Fisch ("The Raven', The Bear' and the Fish's Brother-in-Law") by Elisabet Róna-Sklarek, the animals are a raven, a bear and a fish.

In another Hungarian variant, A Szélördög ("The Wind Devil"), a dying king's last wish is for his sons to wed their sisters to whoever passes by their castle. The youngest prince fulfills his father's wishes by marrying his sisters to a beggar, a wolf, a serpent and a gerbil. Later on, the prince marries a foreign princess, opens a door in her palace and releases the Wind Devil.

In the tale Királyfi Jankó ("The King's Son, Jankó"), Jankó journeys with a talking horse to visit his brothers-in-law: a toad, the "saskirá" (Eagle King) and the "hollókirá" (Raven King). They advice Jankó on how to find "the world's most beautiful woman", who Jankó intends to marry. He finds her, they marry, and he moves to her kingdom. When Jankó explores the castle, he finds a room where a many-headed dragon is imprisoned with golden chains. The prince helps the dragon regain his strength and it escapes, taking the prince's wife with him.

In the variant A szalmakirály, the king's youngest son convinces his father to let his three sisters stroll in the palace's gardens. Moments later, the sisters are abducted by the Sun, the Moon and the Wind. The king summons a council to decide the fate of his youngest; the monarch, however, spares his child's life and order his exile.

==== Greece ====
In the context of Greek variants, Richard MacGillivray Dawkins identified two forms of the type, a simpler and a longer one. In the simple form, the protagonist receives help from the magic brothers-in-law in courting the "Fair One of the World". In the longer form, after the sisters' marriages, the three brothers enter a forest and are attacked by three enemies, usually killed by the third brother. Later, the youngest brother finds a person who alternates day and night by manipulating balls of white and black yarn or skeins, whom he ties up a tree, and later finds a cadre of robbers or giants who intend to invade a nearby king's castle. The tale also continues as the hero's wife is abducted by an enemy creature whose soul lies in an external place.

Johann Georg von Hahn collected a version titled Der Schwager des Löwen, des Tigers und des Adlers from Negades, in Epiros. The animals are a lion, a tiger and an eagle. The tale was translated as The Lion, The Tiger and The Eagle by Reverend Edmund Martin Geldart.

French Hellenist Émile Legrand collected a variant titled Le Dracophage.

German linguist Paul Kretschmer collected a tale from Crete titled Die Töchter des Königs Tsun Matsun ("The Daughter of King Tsun Matsun"), wherein the brothers-in-law are the king of tigers and lions and the king of birds.

Richard McGillivrey Dawkins collected two variants from Ulaghátsh, in Cappadocia, which he dubbed The Magic Brothers-in-Law: in the first, they are married to dervishes; in the second, the girls are married to devs.

==== Albania ====
In an Albanian tale collected by Auguste Dozon (Les Trois Fréres et Les Trois Soeurs), the sisters are married to the sun, the moon and the south wind. It was also collected in German language by linguist August Leskien as Die Geschichte von den drei Brüdern, den drei Schwestern und dem halbeisernen Mann, and into English with the title The Three Brothers and the Three Sisters by Lucy Mary Jane Garnett.

==== Georgia ====
Georgian scholarship registers variants of type AaTh 552A, "Animals as Brothers-in-Law", in Georgia, and notes that the type "contaminates" with type ATU 530, "Magic Horse".

In a Georgian variant, sourced as Mingrelian, Kazha-ndii, the youngest prince gives his sisters as brides to three "demis". They later help him to rescue his bride from the antagonist.

==== Caucasus Mountains ====
Linguist Anton Schiefner collected a tale in the Avar language with the title Der schwarze Nart ("The Black Nart"), wherein the brothers-in-law are still animals: a wolf, a hawk and a falcon.

==== Armenia ====
Armenian scholarship lists 16 versions of type ATU 302 in Armenia, some with the character Ջանփոլադ ('Ĵanp‘olad', Corps d'acier or "Steel Body"), and in five variants of type ATU 552 (of 13 registered), the hero defeats the antagonist by locating his external soul.

In an Armenian variant collected by Frédéric Macler, Le Conte de L'Imberbe Mystérieux, the suitors are described as "demons" in the form of fox, a bear and a wolf.

=== America ===
==== Canada ====
In a Canadian tale, The Boy and the Robbers' Magical Booty, the brothers-in-law are normal humans, but each one of them gives the hero a fish's scale, a feather and a piece of wool to summon animals to his aid in order to defeat the Giant of the Sea.

==== United States ====
A version collected from Armenian descent populations in Detroit shows the marriage of the sisters to three dwarves. In a second, unpublished variant, the sisters are married to a bear, a lion and an eagle.

Professor Stith Thompson pointed that a version was found from a Micmac source and suggested that this tale had possibly migrated from a French source. The tale was titled The Magical Coat, Shoes, and Sword and the three brothers-in-law are a whale, a giant sheep and a gray tame duck, and they help him fight a magician that abducts the wives of the local townspeople and keeps them in his cave. The collector noted the great similarities of it with European fairy tales. In another version of this Micmac story, The Prince who went seeking his Sisters, the brothers-in-law approach the king in human form and only assume animal shapes when they are hunting.

In a variant collected from German descendants in Pennsylvania, the tale begins in medias res with the mother revealing to her son the fate of his three sisters.

Another variant was collected in New Mexico by Elizabeth Willis DeHuff. She noted it was "an old Spanish story" adapted to the worldview of the local Native Americans. In this story, a Spanish father gives his daughters in marriage to three lizards (three princes) in exchange for sacks of money. Years later, a son is born to the man and his wife, and the youth goes on a quest for his elder sisters. He meets the winds of the four cardinal points and steals their inheritance: a pair of magical boots, an invisibility hat and a stick that can kill and revive at the same time. He visits his sisters and his brothers-in-law: a fish, a bull and an eagle. They tell the youth about their sister and give a scale, a tuft of hair and a feather as tokens of assistance. He uses the magical boots to teleport to the lair of a giant who kidnapped the sister of the enchanted princes and discovers its soul lies in a chest at the bottom of the sea.

==== Brazil ====
A version of the tale is attested in Brazilian folklore, collected by Sílvio Romero in Sergipe as O bicho Manjaléo and translated as The Beast Slayer by writer Elsie Spicer Eells. The animal brothers-in-law are referred as King of Fishes, King of Rams and King of Pigeons.

=== Asia ===
==== Middle East ====
In a Middle Eastern variant, a king orders his three sons to marry their three sisters, and their brothers-in-law are a wolf named Dêverasch, an eagle (described as "king of birds") and a bird named "Ssîmer" (simurgh).

==== Iran ====
German scholar Ulrich Marzolph, in his catalogue of Persian folktales, listed two variants of the tale type across Persian sources: the prince respects his father's last wishes and marries his three sisters to a wolf, a lion and a falcon. In the second tale listed, the hero is helped by the animal brothers-in-law in rescuing his wife from a div.

A third Persian variant, published in 1978 and translated as Prince Yousef of the Fairies and King Ahmad, was classified by researcher Pegah Khadish as a combination of tale types ATU 552, ATU 302C* and ATU 400. The tale was translated into Russian by professor Mahomed-Nuri Osmanovich Osmanov with the title "Юсуф — шах пери и Малек-Ахмад" ("Yusuf, the Shah of the Peris and Malek-Ahmad"). In this tale, a dying king orders his sons to marry his three daughters to whoever comes to court them, be it animal or human. The youngest prince, Malek-Ahmad, marries his sisters to a wolf, a lion and an eagle, to his brothers' chagrin, who want to kill him. Malek-Ahmad escapes from the palace and finds work with a Jewish man. He leaves and finds work next with an old woman, a mother of divs. The Div-mother and her sons adopt him as their son and brother. The old woman gives him a set of keys and tells him not to open the 41st door. He opens all doors, finding treasure and objects inside, and the forbidden 41st one. Inside, he meets a prisoner who asks for water; Malek-Ahmad gives him water to drink and he escapes; he tells him he is called Yusuf, the Shah of the Peris, gives him a royal seal, says he can be found on Mount Qaf, and departs. The next day, the opens another forbidden door - the 42nd one - and finds a beautiful garden. He rests a while and sees three doves alight near a pond, become women and bathe in the water. Malek-Ahmad hides the doveskin and the dress of the youngest one. Her sisters sense a mortal man touched her clothes, state she is no longer their sister, and depart. Malek-Ahmad takes the girl to the Div family and they bring a mullah to marry the boy to the dove-maiden (identified as a Peri in the story). The peri-wife gives birth to two sons and Malek-Ahmad misses his home country. He decides to leave the Div-family and reach a village, where he celebrates his wedding with the peri. However, his peri-wife notices that some luti intend to kill him and his sons and kidnap her, so she convinces him to return her belongings. The peri-wife puts on the garments, begs her husband to come find her on Mount Qaf and flies away with her children. The prince asks the Div-family about Mount Qaf, and they say their uncle, the wolf brother-in-law, may know the answer. Malek-Ahmad visits his brothers-in-law and asks them about the location of Mount Qaf. The eagle brother-in-law, in his castle, reads a spell from the Book of prophet Suleyman and summons all birds. A little bird tells the prince its eagle grandmother can take him there. After 40 days feeding the eagle and a journey to Mount Qaf, Malek-Ahmad arrives and drips a magical liquid on his eyes to become invisible. He finds his two sons getting water on the fountain and follows them to their house. He discovers his peri-wife and takes off the invisibility spell. His peri-wife says her brother is Yusuf, the very same person he rescued in the prison. Yusuf embraces Malek-Ahmad, gives him gifts and blesses his marriage to his sister.

==== Turkey ====
Ignacz Kúnos translated a version collected in Istanbul, titled Der Windteufel or The Storm Fiend, where an evil wind spirit carries away the hero's sisters, and later they are married to a lion, a tiger and the "Padishah of the Peris", the emerald anka.

==== Turkmenistan ====
In a tale from Turkmenistan, "Мамед" ("Mamed"), an old man marries his three daughters to three animals: the oldest to the wolf, the middle one to the tiger, and the youngest to the lion. Some time later, the old man is dying, and asks his three sons to hold a vigil on his grave for three nights. Only the youngest fulfills the request and gains three magic horses to beat the king's challenge: jump over a plane tree with a horse and throw an apple at a princess (tale type ATU 530, "The Princess on the Glass Hill"). After he marries the youngest princess, a dev on a horse kidnaps her and the hero, Mamed, is helped by the animal brothers-in-law to rescue his wife.

==== Palestine ====
Professors Ibrahim Muhawi and Sharif Kanaan collected a peculiar Palestinian version, from an old storyteller in Ramallah. This version (Gazele) is peculiar in the sense that is combined with ATU 300 "The Dragon-Slayer" and ATU 302 "The Ogre's Life in the Egg".

==== Philippines ====
Professor Dean Fansler collected two variants from the archipelago: Juan and his Adventures and Pedro and the Giants. In the first story, Juan finds his sisters married to the king of lions, the king of eagles and king of fishes. In the second, two giants marry Pedro's sisters and help him gain a princess for wife.

=== Africa ===
==== West Africa ====
In a Hausa story, a couple has four young daughters that disappear. A son is born later and, when he grows older, seeks his sisters and finds them safe and sound, and married to a bull, a ram, a dog and a hawk. Each of the animals gives a piece of hair or plumage to the boy, if he needs their assistance.

==== Cape Verde ====
Anthropologist Elsie Clews Parsons collected in Cape Verde a variant The Three Brothers-in-Law: his life in the egg, where the hero is given a feather, a scale and a horn to summon the animals to his aid.

==== South Africa ====
In an Angolan tale translated to Russian as "Цари животных" ("The Animal Kings"), three sisters are given to three animals: the eldest, Luanda, married the King of the Birds; Mukazi, the middle daughter, the King of the Antelopes, and Mbeji, the cadette, the King of the Fishes. The three kings take on human forms among humans, but resume their animal forms at home. After the three girls depart, a boy is born to their mother and father after his three sister are married off. He goes to seek his sisters after being mocked due to them being married to beasts. After meeting all three, and receiving from their husbands the items needed to summon them (a feather from the King of the Birds, a tuft of wool from the King of the Antelopes, who is a goat ("козел", in the Russian translation), and a scale from the King of the Fishes), he is so happy that he starts singing and dancing, unknowingly breaking the decree of the Angolan king, who forbid such things due to the Snake King having abducted his daughter. With the help of his brothers-in-law, the man destroys the Snake King's life, after which he is pardoned and marries the princess.

== See also ==
- What Came of Picking Flowers
- The Fair Fiorita
- The Death of Koschei the Deathless
- Bash Chelik
- The Crystal Ball (fairy tale)

== Bibliography ==
- Bolte, Johannes; Polívka, Jiri. Anmerkungen zu den Kinder- u. hausmärchen der brüder Grimm. Dritter Band (NR. 121–225). Germany, Leipzig: Dieterich'sche Verlagsbuchhandlung. 1913. pp. 424–443.
- Leskien, August/Brugman, K. Litauische Volkslieder und Märchen. Straßburg: Karl J. Trübner, 1882. pp. 566–571.
