= The Story of Oimè =

Italian fairy tale

The Story of Oimè (Italian: La Novella di Oimè) is an Italian fairy tale collected by folklorist Giuseppe Pitrè and sourced from Tuscany. In it, a girl marries a mysterious husband, breaks a prohibition set by him and is banished from home; later, she goes to her mother-in-law's castle where she gives birth to her child and the husband comes to rock the child with a lullaby.

It is related to the international cycle of Animal as Bridegroom or The Search for the Lost Husband, in that a human girl marries a supernatural or enchanted husband, loses him and must search for him. Similar stories have been collected from oral tradition across the Mediterranean, in Italy, Greece and Spain, and nearby countries.

== Sources ==
According to Pitrè, the story was provided by informant Umiltà Minucci, from Siena.

== Summary ==
In this tale, a queen is very stingy and tries to be charitable to have a son. She gives alms to a poor old lady in church, and, after the third time, the old lady declares the queen will bear a son, but she will not be able to enjoy motherhood for long. It happens thus: a prince is indeed born and named "Oimè", but some time later, a dog enters the castle and kidnaps the baby. Years later, a poor widowed father lives with his three daughters and scavenges food for them by gathering herbs. One day, he finds a lush garden in a villa, steals some vegetables and sells them in the marketplace. He returns later to steal some more, and tries to uproot a particularly sturdy vegetable. Failing that, he sits a while and utters a sigh: "Oimè". A man appears from the villa window and asks if the man summoned him, for that is his name. Oimè discovers the man is his salad thief, and demands one of his three daughters in payment, saying he will pay him a visit and choose his bride in person. The man's elder daughters lock up their sister to try and deceive Oimè, but he asks to see the third daughter. The girl appears, and Oimè takes her as his bride to his palace.

In the palace, Oimè tells the girl the palace is also hers, but a specific room is strictly forbidden. Time passes, and the girl's sisters pay her a visit. The girl mentions the secret door, and the sisters convince her to open it. After they leave, that same night, the girl steals a key and opens the forbidden door. Inside, she finds a long corridor where woman are preparing a trousseau for Oimè's unborn son. When she reaches the last room, the woman shouts that their work was for her, and, calling the girl ungrateful, expels the girl, and the palace disappears, leaving her in the woods. The girl, pregnant, sees a light in the distance, and reaches a castle where she is given lodge by the queen. She gives birth to a son, and she is secretly visited by Oimè. Two nursemaids see the youth talking to a magic lantern, and rocking the baby with a song that laments that if the roosters never crowed and the bells never rang, he would be happy. On the following nights, the queen is informed about the youth's visit and stays awake to see him: she recognizes it is her own son, and goes to embrace him before he vanishes with the dawn. The sun rises, and the prince remains with the queen, breaking the curse cast by the old lady.

== Analysis ==
=== Tale type ===
Philologist Gianfranco D'Aronco classified the tale as Italian type 425, Lo sposo scomparso ("The Lost Husband"). The Italian type corresponds, in the international Aarne-Thompson-Uther Index, to type ATU 425, "The Search for the Lost Husband".

Renato Aprile, editor of the Italian Catalogue of Tales of Magic, sourced the tale from Siena and classified it as part of the "Amor e Psiche" cycle (type 425), as subtype 425E. In this type, the heroine's husband has a padlock on his body (or a there is a chamber she is forbidden to open); after she betrays his trust, she is expelled and takes shelter in a castle where she gives birth to their child; at night her husband comes to lull the baby with a song in which there are instructions on how to save him.

=== Motifs ===
According to Renato Aprile and Jan-Öjvind Swahn, in some variants of tale type 425E, the heroine's husband watches over his wife and son and converses with a golden lamp about his family.

==== The prince's lullaby ====
In his 1955 monograph, Swahn noted that the husband's lullaby to his child was "rather uniformly formed", containing instructions to extinguish "the cocks [galli] and the clocks [campane]". Similarly, according to Italian literary critic Mario Lavagetto and Anna Buia, the prince's lullaby from Basile's tale is "preserved" in most of the subsequent variants. In the same vein, professor Michael Merakles argued that the prince's lullaby "dissolved" in Greek variants, but its existence can be gleamed by fragmentary references present in the texts.

==== The crowing of the rooster ====
Although they acknowledged that the crowing of the rooster marks type AaTh 425E, Mario Lavagetto and Anna Buia, as well as folklorist Letterio Di Francia, remarked that the motif is "widespread" in Italian tradition. In this regard, German folklorist Rudolf Schenda noted that the rooster's crowing in Basile's tale acquires a negative connotation, since it helps prolong the prince's enchantment, and only by having the roosters killed can he be saved in a more permanent manner. Similarly, according to Di Francia, there is a widespread belief across Italy that the rooster's crowing facilitates the action of supernatural beings, and spells can be broken only by ceasing their singing.

== Variants ==
Scholar Nancy Canepa locates similar stories in Turkey and Greece. Likewise, according to the Greek Folktale Catalogue, type 425E is "popular" in Turkey and Greece, while type 425L (a close subtype) is known across the Greek Aegean Islands and in Asia Minor. On the other hand, Swahn restricted the former subtype to Italy and Catalonia. In the same vein, Renato Aprile described subtype 425E as "almost exclusively" of Central and Southern Italian provenance, barring some Catalan texts.

=== Italy ===
==== L'Ombrion ====
Author Vittorio Imbriani collected a tale from Florence with the title L'Ombrion, which Imbriani related to Lo Catenaccio. In this tale, a man has three daughters and is so poor he lives on alms. One day, the man finds a lush garden and fetches some herbs, when a man appears to him like an ombre (a shadow). The somber creature asks the man the purpose of his visit, and demands one of his daughters be delivered to him, unless he wishes to forfeit his life. The old man returns home and asks which of daughters will go to the ombre to save their father's life: the elder two refuse, while the youngest agrees to go with him. The old man takes his youngest to the ombre, and they descend a staircase to splendid underground quarters, where they begin to live together. However, the girl is forbidden to light any candle in their quarters, and she senses someone snoring at her side. One day, the girl begins to miss home, and the ombrion allows her to visit her sisters for a period of 24 hours, then she must be back. The girl visits her sisters and is given a candle to use at night when she goes back to her mysterious husband. She follows her sisters' suggestion and finds a handsome youth beside her, with a key next to his neck. She steals the key and uses it to open the doors of the underground palace, where she finds women working in some preparations for the king's son. She leaves the door and her husband, the youth, banishes her from his palace, but advises her to go to the king's court, where she will be given lodge and whose royal family is searching for him. While the girl is away at the castle, the youth resumes the ombrion form and converses to a magical lantern about his wife. One night, the lantern tells him his wife is sleeping soundly, and he sings a poem about if the roosters cannot crow and the bells cannot ring, then he will remain. A servant of the castle listens to the song another night and reports to the king, who fulfills the command: he orders the roosters to be killed all over the kingdom and bells to be muffled. The next morning, the servants enter the girl's room with breakfast, and sees a man by her side. The king comes to her room and recognizes the man as his son, and marries him to the girl.

==== The Celery ====
Austrian philologist Christian Schneller collected and translated a tale from Wälschtirol with the title Der Selleri (Italian: Lo sellem; English: "The Celery"). In this tale, a father has three daughters, and asks them to fetch some rice for him, because he wants some soup. The elder daughter finds a bush of celery in their garden and tries to pull it, but cannot do so. The middle sister joins and tries to help her, to no avail. The third sister, also the youngest and the most beautiful, decides to pull the herb herself, but instead she is pulled down into the ground, and reaches a meadow in front of a castle. The girl enters the castle and is welcomed by a small man with a large beard. They live together in the underground castle, but the man forbids her to open a certain door. One day, however, while the small man is away, the girl opens the forbidden room and discovers women preparing linen clothes, and sees a cradle of pure gold. The girl asks whom the women are preparing for, and the women retort in a harsh answer that everything was for her. The girl locks the door behind her and the old man appears to her, explaining he is an enchanted prince who was just about to be free from his curse, but his companion betrayed him. The girl leaves the palace and wanders off until she reaches a castle where she is given lodge by the queen. Some time later, the girl gives birth to a son, who is cared for by two nursemaids. One night, the old man talks to his magic lantern about his wife and son, calling it golden lantern with silver wick, and visits their chambers in the castle. While there, he sings a lullaby and mentions that he would be with his son if the rooster never crowed and the bells never rang the hours. This happens on the following two nights, and the queen, on the third night, manages to run after before he vanishes and grabs a celery he left behind. The next morning, the queen, advised by the nursemaids, throws the celery in the fireplace. All of a sudden, the sounds of trampling horses and a carriage are heard approaching the castle: it is the queen's son, the prince, released from his curse. Author Ruth Manning-Sanders translated and published the tale as Celery, in her book Gianni and the Ogre.

==== The Golden Lamp (Sardinia) ====
In a Sardinian tale collected from a source in Luras with the title La lampana de oro ("The Golden Lamp"), a king and queen are childless and say prayers to have one. One day, Gesú Cristos (Jesus Christ) appears in their castle to grant them their wish. In time, the queen gives birth to her son, but Jesus Christ warns that the prince cannot have contact with the fairies. Thus, the prince is raised in a tower. One day, when he is older, he goes to the balcony and the fairies abscond with him to a subterranean palace with twelve rooms under a grassy field. Near the field, lives a poor family of a father and his three daughters. The man forages for herbs to feed his daughters. One day he pulls a bush and suddenly a handsome youth (the prince) appears to him with an offer: a bag of money for one of the man's daughters as the youth's wife. The man returns home and asks his daughters which will go with the mysterious youth: the elder two refuse, save for the youngest. The man brings his cadette to the youth and she goes with him to a rich underground palace where she lives with the youth, with the caveat not to open a twelfth door. After a year, the girl is curious enough to learn what lies behind the forbidden door and decides to open it: inside she finds twelve fairies singing and weaving clothes for the prince's unborn son. The fairies notice the girl is with them and orders them to silence. The palace disappears, leaving the girl in the desert. She wanders off until she reaches the king's castle, where she is given lodge and a room where she can give birth to her son. Soon, at midnight, a person stays outside the castle, hangs a golden lamp with a golden chain and sings to the lamp, calling it golden lamp, silver lamp, and asking that if his mother knew, his son would lie in golden clothes. The maidservants guarding the guest alert the queen and she captures the owner of the mysterious voice: it is her son, the prince, kidnapped by the fairies long ago. The prince tells his mother his burden is at an end and asks her to place him inside a cauldron of hot water, for he will become even more beautiful. It happens thus, and the prince is released.

==== The Golden Lamp (Bergamo) ====
In a tale in the Bergamasque dialect, collected from informant Carola Guerini from Casnigo and translated to Italian as La lampada d'oro ("The Golden Lamp"), a widowed peasant has three daughters and goes go the market to sell vegetables. One day, he asks which gifts he can bring them: the eldest asks for a nice shirt, the middle one for an apron, and the cadette for a bouquet of flowers. It is winter; the man sells his produce in the market and finds the garments for his daughters, save for the bouquet. He sights a little road and follows it, which leads to a beautiful garden. He tries to call for the host, but, since no one responds, he goes to pluck the flowers and makes a beautiful bouquet. When he turns around to leave, a pig ("maiale") stops him in his tracks, and tells the man that in a year and three days he shall give him the daughter for whom he is to bring the flowers, and he will let the man go. The man is surprised at the talking pig, and the animal insists on his demand for the man's daughter, for he wants to marry her. The man promises to do so, and returns home. He gives the gifts to his daughters, and worries for the future of the youngest. Some time passes, and the man is increasingly worried about marrying his youngest daughter to the pig. His eldest notices their father looks despondent, and he reveals that their cadette is to be given to the pig, but suggests if the eldest would agree to replace her. She refuses the idea to his face, but the cadette overhears and agrees to marry the pig.

The man takes the youngest daughter to the pig's palace after the elapsed time. The pig shows the girl every room, and he tells her he is trapped in the palace, for he becomes a youth at night and remains a pig by day. After one or two years, the girl has a son with the pig prince, and wishes to pay her family a visit. The pig prince allows it, but tells her to avoid being kissed, lest she forgets everything. She passes by the palace gates, and an old woman reminds her not to be kissed by her father. The girl returns home, spends time with her family, but avoids her father kissing her, and goes to sleep. At night, one of her aunts goes to kiss her front, glad that the girl is back home. Time passes, and her father tells her to return to her marital home. After a conversation with her father, she remembers everything, and decides to walk back home. Back at the palace, the girl meets the same old woman, who tells her that her husband has departed, but says that she can find him after she wears down three pairs of iron shoes; she will then find a castle where she can take shelter. The girl does as the old woman instructed and wanders off on a long journey, as she takes her son with her and he grows up. After wearing down the three pairs of iron shoes and walking a bit more, she reaches the doors to a palace, where she begs for shelter since she is tired and hungry. A servant brings her in and lets her eat a meal, then says the castle belongs to the queen, whose son is missing. The queen agrees to take the visitor in and arranges the best room for her, on a bed next to a golden lamp.

At midnight, while mother and son are sleeping, a person enters the room and asks the golden lamp, which the voice calls "golden lamp, silver wick", how fare his wife and child. The golden lamp replies his wife is asleep, and the voice laments in some verses that if the roosters did not crow and the bells did not ring, he would be next to his wife, then goes down the stairs. The following morning, the queen goes to check on her guest, who says she heard the golden lamp speaking. Dismissing the narration as a dream at first, the queen decides to spend the night in the same room. On the second night, at midnight, the same mysterious person comes in the room, talks to the golden lamp, and repeats the lament about the roosters and the bells, then disappears. The queen confirms the guest's story about the lamp and tells the king about it. The monarch dismisses it at first, but decides to have the roosters killed and for anyone not to sound any bell, so he issues an order through the city to kill the roosters and to muffle the bells. On the third night, at midnight, the stranger comes to talk to the golden lamp, then wishes once again for the roosters not to crow and the bells not to ring. The stranger goes to sleep, as the roosters do not crow and the bells do not ring. In the morning, the girl wakes up and recognizes the stranger as her husband, who explains that this castle is his house. The prince embraces his wife and son, and the king and queen reunite with the missing prince.

==== The Fish King (Marche) ====
In an Italian tale from Marche with the title Lu Re Pesce, translated as Il Re Pesce ("The Fish King"), a fisherman is catching some fishes and catches a large fish, which pleads for its life in exchanging for making the man very lucky. The fisherman does and catches a net full of fishes. This continues for days on end, as the fish promised. One day, the same fish emerges from the sea and asks the fisherman for the hand of the fisherman's daughter in marriage. The fisherman tells the fish that he will ask his daughter about it and bring the answer. The girl is asked about the marriage with the fish, and accepts, then is brought to the beach to meet her piscine bridegroom. The fish appears and takes the girl to a small, luxurious palace in the middle of the sea. However, she is all alone, for she cannot see anyone in the palace, and her husband only returns at night, but leaves at dawn. The girl asks the fish husband if she can invite her sister to soothe her loneliness, and the fish agrees: the fish brings his sister-in-law in her mouth. The sisters greet each other and the elder asks the younger about the mysterious husband. The elder advises the younger to hide a lamp inside a pine cone, and for them to wait at night for his arrival. At night, the mysterious husband goes to sleep on the bed, and the sisters spy on him: they find not a fish, but a handsome young man. The fish's bride, being pregnant, emits a cry of joy. The young man wakes up and asks his bride the reason for the lamp, and his sister-in-law explains the lamp was her idea. The young man becomes even more furious and orders his bride to pack her things, for he will take her back to her family. The girl pleads with him to stay. The following day, the young man takes the girl to a window and points to a castle in the distance, explaining that he will take her there to the nearby beach. He also tells her that if he does not find her tonight, he will notice that she has stayed in the castle with its king and queen, who have been searching for his son - himself - turned into a fish by some witches. The fish young man takes his bride to the beach, and she finds some women weaving and a carpenter. The women explain that they are sewing the cloths and sheets for the king's unborn grandson, and the carpenter is making the baby's cradle. The carpenter also points to the castle and says that the monarchs are searching for the missing prince and his bride. The girl asks the carpenter why they are doing this if the prince and his family are missing, but the carpenter says that the king and queen promised a great reward if they are found. Thus, the girl reaches the castle and asks for shelter, but the king denies her, so some kitchen servants offer her a bowl of soup and some meat. The girl refuses them, so the servants inform the king, who orders them to chase her away with a broom. When they return to attend to the girl, she is on the verge of giving birth, so they bring her in.

The girl gives birth, and the queen asks her about her husband, but she avoids giving any answer. The queen believes her to be a woman of loose morals. At night, the fish prince reaches shore, does not find his wife, so he goes to his parents' palace, where he enters through a secret passage. He admires his baby son, born with curly reddish hair. He stays by his wife and son's side until the bells ring, and he slips away. On the second night, he returns to be with his wife and son, asking the lamp how the monarchs are treating them. The girl replies with a question: if the roosters did not crow and the bells did not ring, and the queen knew, what would happen to her. The prince appears in the following nights and disappears at dawn, with them exchanging the same words. Some servants overhear their conversation and report to the king. The king questions how one is present in the girl's room and through which entrance he comes from. The servants reply that they lock every gate at the time of the Angelus, so the king decides to investigate it himself, only to find no one by the time of the morning bell of Ave Maria. The king thus takes the set of keys with him to his bed and requests the servants' help in discovering the intruder. While the king is asleep, the servants plot to break into the girl's room and beat the intruder with some clubs. At midnight, the servants hear the person's voice and go to call the king. The monarch wakes up, takes a sword and breaks into the girl's room: he finds a large fish escaping, so he strikes it with his sword, drawing blood. However, the fish transforms into the missing prince, his son. The story explains that drawing blood from the person's cursed form releases them from the spel. The prince, restored to human form, shows the king the secret door. The king gives a grand celebration, crowns his son and the girl, and names his grandson "Fish King's son".

=== Switzerland ===
Politician Caspar Decurtins published a Rhaeto-Romance tale from Surselva, L'ampla d'aur or Die goldene Lampe ("The Golden Lamp"). In this tale, a miller has three daughters, the elder two lazy, and the youngest kind. One day, the miller has to go to the city during winter, and his three daughters ask for presents, the elder two for dresses, and the youngest for a bouquet of wildflowers. During his journey, he enters a magical castle whose doors open and close by themselves, and occupied by cats. He finds the wildflowers in the garden and goes to pluck some, when suddenly a snake springs up from the fountain and coils around the miller's arm, demanding the man's daughter in exchange for the flowers. The man agrees and returns home with the bouquet, which he gives to his youngest daughter and reveals the situation. The elder two chastise their cadette for her request, but the girl decides to offer herself in her father's place to the serpent. She goes to the magical castle and the feline staff welcome her in. At night, when she goes to sleep, she feels someone comes to lie with her in bed, but she does not see him. On the third night, she lights a lamp to better see her companion, and finds a handsome youth next to her. The story then explains the youth is a prince cursed by a witch into the serpentine form. Back to the girl, wax drops fall on the prince's body, who disappears and says the girl will only find him when she tears down iron shoes. After the prince vanishes, the girl meets an old woman that advises her to place the iron shoes in steaming cow dung to break them apart. The trick works. Later, the girl goes to the city and finds shelter with the queen, who takes her in. The girl gives birth to a son. At night, someone comes to the castle and talks to a golden lamp, calling it golden lamp with silver wick and mentioning how if the roosters did not crow and the bells did not ring, he would stay during the day and cradle his child. The voice returns the next night and repeats the words. The queen, who has overheard the words, orders her servants to kill the crows around the city and muffle the bells. The third night, the voice comes again, talking about the crows and the bells, to which the queen answers the crows were killed and the bells silenced. The owner of the voice appears: the queen's son, previously turned into a serpent, who has returned at last.

=== Romani-Manouche ===
In a tale collected by Joseph Valet from a Manouche teller named Anna Warner, with the Manouche title O ŠaXéskro Šero, translated as Tête de chou ("Head of Cabbage"), a peasant couple have many children. One day, two poor girls go to a cabbage patch up north in order to pluck some cabbages. One of the girls stay by the cartwheel while the other plucks the heads, until she finds a large head she wishes to take. Suddenly, a voice tells her to stop trying to pluck his head. The second girl thinks the cabbage is speaking, and cuts it off, but she finds herself sided by two nuns that guide her to a castle. Inside the castle, she is given a sleeping drink to sleep. During her sleep, a prince with a cabbage head comes to her bed to spend the night with her, although the girl knows nothing about it. Sometime later, she discovers she is pregnant and decides to discover her mysterious bedmate, so she spills the potion and feigns sleep. At night, the prince comes and sleeps next to her. She wakes up and sees the prince with the cabbage head next to her, and two doors with keys on his chest: she opens the first one, and finds a witch that says she is sewing socks for the prince's unborn son; behind the second door, there are two witches sewing a cap and a hat for the baby. Suddenly, the cabbage prince wakes up, admonishes the girl, who has become his wife, for her curiosity, gives her a spool of thread for her to pull and follow. The girl, pregnant, traverses bushes and forests until she reaches the castle that belongs to the cabbage prince's father. She gives birth to her son on the side of the road, but a kind shepherd finds her and takes her to the castle stables. At night, the Prince with the Cabbage Head comes in at night and asks the lamp how fare his wife and son, then goes around the bed and sighs over his wife and son, lamenting his misery when he hears the first clocks and the first rooster and mentioning how if his father knew their identities, the girl would be wearing gold and their baby diamonds. The shepherd overhears the lament and tells the king. The monarch, however, refuses to believe the tale, since his son is missing. Still, he kills the roosters and silences all the clocks. That same night, the prince with the Cabbage Head enters the stable, repeats his lament to his wife, but he does not hear any rooster, nor any bell, and falls asleep. The following morning, he finds himself restored to normal. The king reunites with his lost son, then has his daughter-in-law dressed in gold and his grandson in diamonds. French researcher Bénédicte Bonnemason classified the tale as type 425E, "Enchanted Husband Sings Lullaby", which she noted to not have been recorded in France, but registered in Southern Europe (Iberian Peninsula and Italy), Central Europe and Mediterranean.

== See also ==
- The Padlock (fairy tale)
- Filek-Zelebi
