= Panagiotis Aravantinos =

Greek scholar and educator

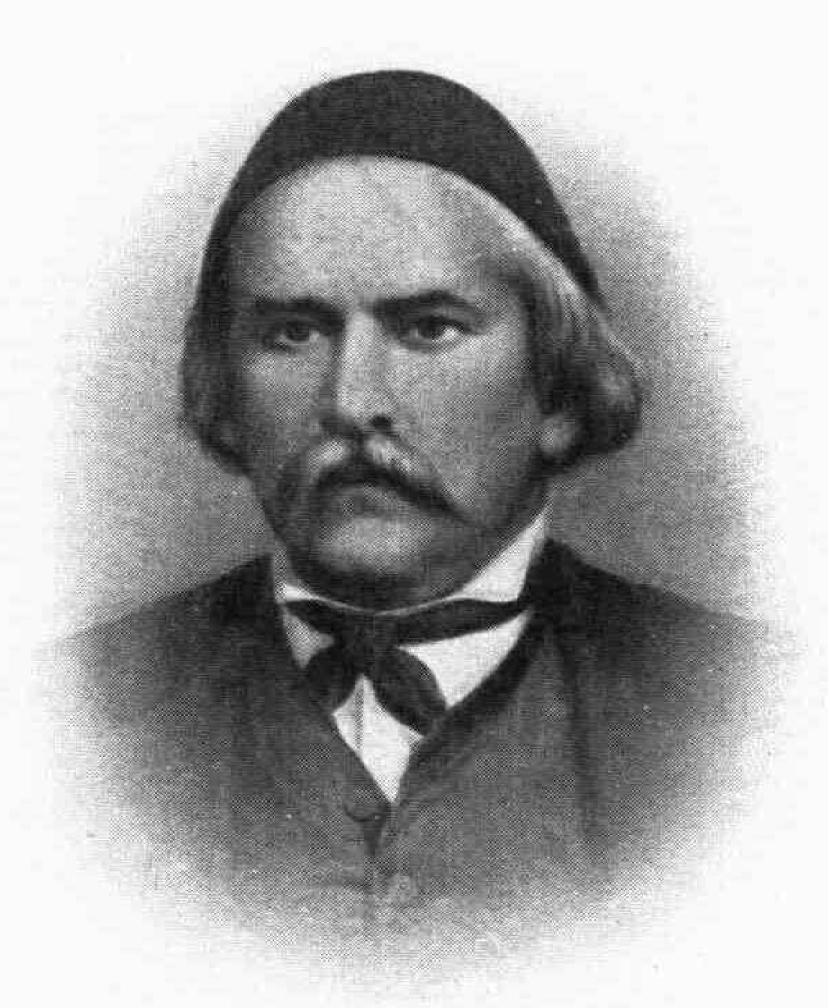
Panagiotis Aravantinos

Panagiotis Aravantinos (Greek: Παναγιώτης Αραβαντινός, 1809 or 1811 – 1870) was a Greek scholar and educator who was born in Parga. He worked primarily in Epirus, which was then under the rule of the Ottoman Empire. As with many Greek names, his names appears in English literature in a variety of Romanizations, e.g. the first name as Panagiōtēs or Panayiotis etc., and the last name, as Aravandinos.

Aravantinos is recognized as the author of an important early work on the history of Epirus.

In the English-speaking world Aravantinos in mostly known as a folklorist. The collection of folk songs he had collected in his region, "Συλλογή δημωδών ασμάτων της Ηπείρου", was published posthumously in Athens in 1880. Soon after, on the initiative of John Stuart Stuart-Glennie, the songs collected by Aravantinos, along with the folkloric material from other collections, were translated by Lucy Garnett and made available to the English reader. In Stuart-Glennie's view, it was here, in Aravantinos' northern Greece, where the ancient Greek folkloric tradition was best preserved.
