= Padlock (disambiguation) =

A padlock is a simple detachable lock with a hinged or sliding shackle.

Padlock may also refer to:

- The Padlock, a comic opera by Isaac Bickerstaffe and Charles Dibdin
- Padlock, a 1985 EP by Gwen Guthrie
- VIA PadLock, a security co-processor by VIA Technologies integrated in some of their CPUs
- The Padlock (fairy tale), an Italian literary fairy tale from the Pentamerone

== See also ==
- Padlocked, a 1926 silent film
