= John Stuart Stuart-Glennie =

John Stuart Stuart-Glennie (1841–1910) was a Scottish barrister, folklorist, philosopher, founding sociologist, and socialist.

== Life ==
He was the son of Alexander Glennie of Maybank Aberdeen; John Stuart of Inchbreck was his maternal grandfather He was educated in law at the University of Aberdeen and University of Bonn and was called to the bar at the Middle Temple.

Stuart-Glennie later left the law and travelled in Europe and Asia to collect folklore. He wrote a series of books and numerous articles, developing a broad philosophy of history. He also contributed to the Folklore Society. His ideas were ahead of the time.

== Views and associations ==
Eugene Halton has claimed that Stuart-Glennie’s most significant idea was his theory, first published in 1873, of what he termed "the moral revolution", delineating deep changes across different civilizations in the period 2,500 years ago, roughly centred around 600-500 BCE. It formed the second stage of his three stage "Ultimate Law of History." This historical shift around roughly 600 BCE in a variety of civilizations, most notably ancient China, India, Judaism, and Greece, was termed the Axial Age ("die Achsenzeit") by Karl Jaspers in 1949.

In his last publication on the moral revolution, published in 1906 in Sociological Papers, Stuart-Glennie reiterated his thesis: “…one great epoch can be signalised—that which I was, I believe, the first, thirty-two years ago ([In the Morningland:] “New Philosophy of History,” 1873), to point out as having occurred in the sixth (or fifth-sixth) century B.C. in all the countries of civilisation from the Hoangho to the Tiber. There arose then, as revolts against the old religions of outward observance or custom, new religions of inward purification or conscience—in China, Confucianism; in India, Buddhism; in Persia, Zoroastrianism; in Syria, Yahvehism (as a religion of the people rather than merely of the prophets), and changes of a similar character in the religions also of Egypt, of Greece, and of Italy.”

Stuart-Glennie's theory of the moral revolution was part of a broader three phase critical philosophy of history, which included gradations unexplored by Jaspers, such as a view of prehistory as “panzoonist” in outlook, a worldview of revering “all life” as a religious basis for conceiving nature. Stuart-Glennie proposed panzooinism in 1873 as an alternative to E. B. Tylor’s theory of animism, which appeared in 1871. Whereas Tylor’s idea of animism held that spirit inhabits things from without, Stuart-Glennie’s panzooinism allowed that inherent powers of nature are worthy of attention and devotion. Stuart-Glennie's model of religion and history thus originates out of perceptive relations to habitat, that is, as motivated by the belief in the livingness of things as providing clues for human living. As he put it in 1876, "the Civilisations prior to the Sixth Century B.C. were chiefly determined by the Powers and Aspects of Nature, and those posterior thereto by the Activities and Myths of Mind." By contrast, Jaspers denied major significance to religions prior to the Axial Age. Stuart-Glennie’s theory of the moral revolution is set in the context of a comparative theory of history that gave great attention to material conditions, as well as to pre-Axial folk cultures and civilizations, both of which Jaspers undervalued or ignored. Where Jaspers’ theory of the Axial Age was arguably flawed by ethnocentrism, Stuart-Glennie’s philosophy of history was unfortunately flawed by his acceptance of the “scientific” racism of the times, illustrated in his claim that civilization began in the “Conflict of Higher and Lower Races.”

As a young man of twenty-one Stuart-Glennie had met and travelled with the well-known philosopher John Stuart Mill, whose middle name was given to him by his father, philosopher James Mill, to honour Stuart-Glennie's grandfather, Sir John Stuart. Mill approved of Stuart-Glennie's interests in positive science and history, and also influenced his conception of humanitarianism, which became a key element of Stuart-Glennie’s third phase of history. Mill said of Stuart-Glennie that he was, "a young man of, I think, considerable promise, who occupies himself very earnestly with the higher philosophical problems on the basis of positive science."

Stuart-Glennie met and became a friend of Irish playwright, critic, and political activist George Bernard Shaw in 1885. Both shared an interest in socialism. In his preface to his play, Major Barbara, Shaw compared Stuart-Glennie favorably to Friedrich Nietzsche. Shaw described Stuart-Glennie’s writing on how religious legitimation could be used for social dominance, instilling fear and subordination in the underclass, and false hope in a just afterlife: the rise of what Stuart-Glennie called the “Hell religions.” Stuart-Glennie was also seen, by Shaw, as a successor to Henry Buckle, with a theory of origins of civilization and religious transformations going back some eight thousand years, and based on racial foundations. In his 1956 book, The Transformations of Man, Lewis Mumford credited him with anticipating Jaspers' Axial Age concept. Mumford became aware of Stuart-Glennie’s work around 1920, while editing The Sociological Review in London, through Stuart-Glennie’s friend and Mumford’s mentor sociologist Patrick Geddes.

As a disciple of Buckle, with whom he travelled, Stuart-Glennie was heavily criticised by John Mackinnon Robertson in Buckle and His Critics; Robertson took up challenges to his account of Buckle in Pilgrim Travels, made in the biography by Alfred Huth, was dismissive as callow of the theories about the era of 600 BC, and discounted John Fiske as a supporter of Stuart-Glennie. Robertson’s dismissal of Stuart-Glennie’s original thesis concerning the era of the moral revolution demonstrates how the times were not ready for an idea that only became widely known after Jaspers’ book in the mid twentieth century.

In 1885 Stuart-Glennie met and befriended George Bernard Shaw in London at the house of Jane Wilde, known as "Speranza". He took part in a socialist demonstration in Trafalgar Square, in 1887. He clashed with Annie Besant in wanting to include family matters in the charter of the Social Democratic Federation during the 1880s; and was later a Fabian for a time, before coming up against the same issue of women's rights as foundational.

Stuart-Glennie was also a founding contributor to the emergence of sociology, as Eugene Halton has shown. He was an active participant in the fledgling Sociological Society of London in the first decade of the twentieth century, and a friend of early sociologist and fellow Scotsman Patrick Geddes and also Victor Branford. Geddes published an obituary for Stuart-Glennie in the new sociological journal, The Sociological Review, in 1910. Geddes’ review begins: "Of the many historical, sociological, and philosophical writings of the late Mr. J. S. Stuart-Glennie three characteristic examples are to be found in Sociological Papers, Vol. II." In one of his papers delivered to the society, published in 1906, he predicted a Russian revolution and transformation of Europe by the year 2000, a "United States of Europe."

Stuart-Glennie was involved in the attempt to set up a Celtic League in 1886, and in Scottish activism of the 1890s. Patrick Geddes was influenced by his pan-Celticism.

== Folklore ==
Stuart-Glennie is remembered as a folklorist for his extreme ethnological stance regarding the origin of folklore, for which he introduced a neologism "koenononosography" in 1889. He presented a racial theory of folklore origins at the International Folk-lore Congress of 1891.

Anthropologists in the 19th century, such as Edward Burnett Tylor, argued that mythical beings could have been modeled on historic "savage" or "primitive" races. This theory was developed by Edwin Sidney Hartland, Andrew Lang, and Laurence Gomme; and as an offshoot emerged the racialist concept that myths and folklore contain a basis of conflicting lower and higher races.

Laurence Waddell and Alfred Cort Haddon were two authors who were proponents of the racialist interpretation of folklore. Stuart-Glennie went further, and gained attention with his theory that swan maidens were superior women of an archaic white race, wedded to a dark skinned race beneath them in level of civilization.

== Works ==
- Arthurian localities: Their historical origin, chief country, and Fingalian relations; with a map of Arthurian Scotland. Edinburgh: Edmonston and Douglas. 1869.
- In the Morningland; or, The law of the origin and transformation of Christianity (1873)
- New Philosophy of History (1873)
- Pilgrim-memories; or, Travel and discussion in the birth-countries of Christianity with the late Henry Thomas Buckle (1875)
- Isis and Osiris; or, The Origin of Christianity: As a Verification of an Ultimate Law of History (1878)
- Europe and Asia, discussions of the Eastern question in travels through independent, Turkish, and Austrian Illyria (1879)
- The Archaian white races (1887, pamphlet)
- Greek folk-songs from the Ottoman provinces of Northern Hellas (1888)
- The women of Turkey and their folk-lore (1890, 2 volumes, with Lucy Garnett)
- Greek folk poesy; annotated translations from the whole cycle of Romaic folk-verse and folk-prose (1896, with Lucy Garnett) (based on the collections of Panayiotis Aravantinos and other Greek folklorists)
