= Turkey of the Ottomans =

1911 anthropological book by Lucy Garnett

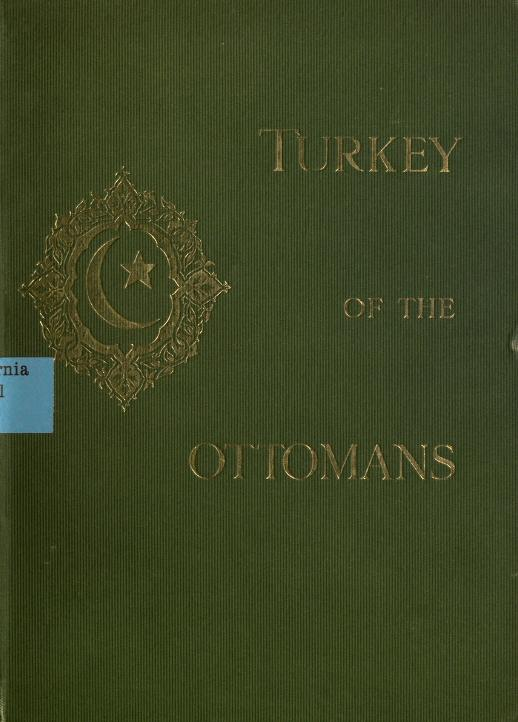
- Author: Lucy Garnett
- Publisher: Charles Scribner's Sons
- Publication date: 1911

Turkey of the Ottomans is an anthropological book written by Lucy Garnett and published by Charles Scribner's Sons in 1911. The book is a collection of summaries on socio-cultural and political structures of the Ottoman Empire in the early 20th century. It's compiled from both the author's first-hand experiences during her time in Turkey and third-hand sources. The book received good receptions at the time of its release.

== Chapters ==
1. Muslim Ottomans
2. Christian Ottomans
3. Hebrew Ottomans
4. The Ottoman Sultan
5. The Ottoman Parliament
6. Law Courts, Police and Army
7. The Religion of Islam
8. Christianity in Turkey
9. Judaism in Turkey
10. Urban Life
11. Agrarian Turkey
12. Pastoral Turkey
13. Ottoman Homes and Home-Life
14. Education and Life
15. Turkey at Play
16. Index

== New editions ==
Since the 2010s, many more publishing houses such as Palala Press, Kessinger Publishing, Forgotten Books have released modernized new editions of the book.
