= The Golden Root =

Fairy tale

The Golden Root or The Golden Trunk (Neapolitan: Lo turzo d'oro; Italian: Il ceppo d'oro) is a literary fairy tale written by Giambattista Basile in the Pentamerone, as the fourth story of the fifth day. It is considered to be one of two rewritings of the Graeco-Roman myth of "Cupid and Psyche" by Basile, the other being "Lo Catenaccio".

In spite of its origins as a literary tale, it is related to the international cycle of Animal as Bridegroom or The Search for the Lost Husband, in that a human girl marries a supernatural or enchanted husband, loses him and must search for him. Similar stories have been collected from oral tradition in Italy.

== Summary ==
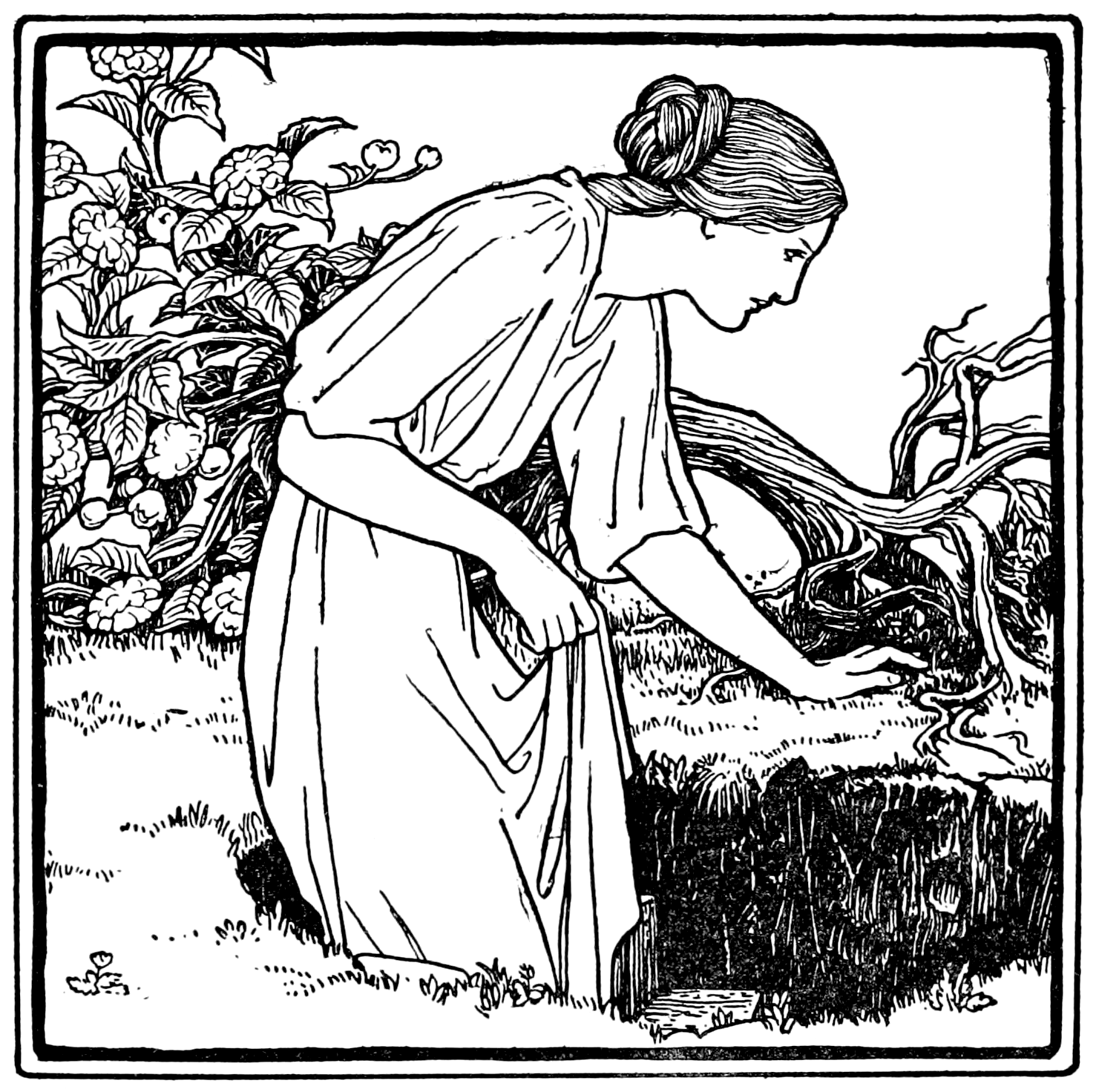
The maiden descends the hole to the underground palace. Illustration by John Batten for Joseph Jacobs's Europa's Fairy Book (1916).

The tale focuses on Parmetella, a poor girl and youngest of three sisters: she, Pascuzza and Cice. They are daughters of a gardener, who gives them pigs to rear in hopes of getting a future dowry. Her sisters often force Parmetella to drive the pigs in another part of the meadow, where she eventually finds a fountain and a tree with golden leaves beside it. She collects some foliage and gives them to her father who sells them as she returns. She repeats the action until the tree is stripped bare of its foliage.

Some time later, Parmetella notices that the golden-leaved tree has a golden root. She takes an axe to the root and finds a staircase leading underground. She descends on the hole where the tree trunk once stood and reaches a luxurious palace. She wanders through the palace and marvels at its sights, until she sees a table with food and drink. As she approaches the table, a Moorish slave appears before her and asks her to be his wife. She accepts the proposal before the slave tells her that she must promise never to light a lamp during the night, to which she consents.

The next night however, Parmetella waits until her mysterious companion is asleep, and lights a candle out of curiosity. She sees a handsome man in the place of her companion. The man wakes up, curses her for not obeying his orders, saying he will have to suffer another seven years with his curse, and vanishes. Parmetella leaves the palace and meets a fairy just outside the cave. The fairy warns her that she is "going to a slaughterhouse", and gives her seven spindles, seven figs, a jar of honey, and seven pairs of iron shoes. She instructs her to keep walking, passing by a straight bridge, narrow as a strand of hair, and until she meets seven bone-eating ogresses who are spinning on a bone on the balcony of a house. Parmetella is to wait for them to lower the bone, which she must replace for a spindle smeared with honey and put a fig in place of a button; the ogresses will ask her to come out, but Parmetella is to deny them; they will continue to find objects to swear an oath to, until they mention Truone-e-lampe's ("Thunder-and-Lightning") name - that is when she may appear to them.

After seven years walking in her iron shoes, she reaches a large house with a balcony with seven ogresses on it, just as the fairy predicted. Following the fairy's instructions, Parmetella gives them the honey-smeared spindle and figs, and waits until they swear on Truone-e-lampe's name not to harm her. After they make the promise, Parmetella appears to them. The ogresses mock and scold her, since they blame Parmetella for their brother Truone-e-lampe living as a blackamoor in a cave for 14 years, away from them. Despite the initial friction, the seven ogresses advise Parmetella to hide before their ogress mother arrives, and, when her guard is down, to catch her by surprise by clutching her breasts and make her swear on her son's name, Truone-e-lampe, not to harm her.

Following the ogress daughter's advice, Parmetella grabs her ogress mother-in-law from behind and makes her promise on her son's name not to harm her. After being released, the ogress mother, furious, claims she will make her pay when the right opportunity appears. The ogress mother then orders Parmetella, as a first task, to separate twelve sacks of grains that have been mixed into a single heap. Her husband, Truone-e-lampe, appears again before her and summons an army of ants to separate the grains, helping her in the process. As a second task, the ogress demands that she fills a dozen mattresses with feathers, which she also accomplishes with her husband's advice: she spreads the mattresses on the ground and shouts that the king of the birds is dead, and all the birds appear to give her some of their feathers.

The last task given to her is to go to the ogress' sister's house and fetch a box of instruments from her, to be used in the future wedding of Truone-e-lampe with another bride. Following her husband's advice, she enters the sister's house, gives food to the horse and the dog, and compliments the door hinges. She then tricks the ogress's niece, who goes into the oven instead of her, and takes the box of instruments before the witch commands the door hinges, the horse and the dog to stop her. Parmetella, however, leaves unscathed due to her previous actions. At a safe distance from the witch, curiosity takes the best of her again as she opens the box; causing musical instruments to fly out in process. Truone-e-lampe fortunately reappears before her and, with a whistle, commands the instruments back into the box.

Finally, the ogress mother prepares her son's wedding: she gives a torch to each of her seven daughters, and two to Parmetella to hold, and places her near a well so that, when she falls asleep, she may fall into it. Truone-e-lampe's ugly bride passes by Parmetella and mocks her for not kissing the bridegroom after claiming she has kissed a herdsman for some chestnuts. Truone-e-lampe overhears the bride's confession and fumes silently. After the wedding party is over, in his nuptial chambers, Truone-e-lampe kills his bride.

The ogress mother later sees her son in Parmetella's arms. Infuriated, she decides to conspire with her sister to get rid of her. When she enters her sister's house, the ogress discovers that, out of grief for losing her baby, her sister has jumped into the oven to die alongside her. The ogress turns into a ram and butts its head against the wall, leaving her fate unknown. Truone-e-lampe and Parmetella ultimately make peace with their sisters-in-law and live happily.

== Analysis ==
=== Tale type ===
The tale belongs to the international cycle of the Animal as Bridegroom or The Search for the Lost Husband, which corresponds, in the Aarne-Thompson-Uther Index, to tale type ATU 425, "The Search for the Lost Husband", and its subtypes. Philologist Gianfranco D'Aronco classified the tale as Italian type 425, Lo sposo scomparso ("The Lost Husband"). Nancy Canepa indexes it as type 425A, "The Animal as Bridegroom". Renato Aprile, editor of the Italian Catalogue of Tales of Magic, sourced the tale from Campania and classified it as part of the "Amor e Psiche" cycle (type 425), as subtype 425B.

Scholars have called attention to structural similarities between the tale and the Graeco-Roman myth of Cupid and Psyche, as related by Apuleius in the 2nd century AD. In fact, The Golden Root is considered to be one of Basile's renditions of the myth, the other being Il catenaccio ("The Padlock", former tale type AaTh 425L, "The Padlock on the Enchanted Husband"). Folklorist Joseph Jacobs stated that The Golden Root is the first appearance in modern times of the "Cupid and Psyche story" (invisible husband, breaking a taboo, heroine's tasks for mother-in-law).

=== Motifs ===
==== The heroine's tasks ====
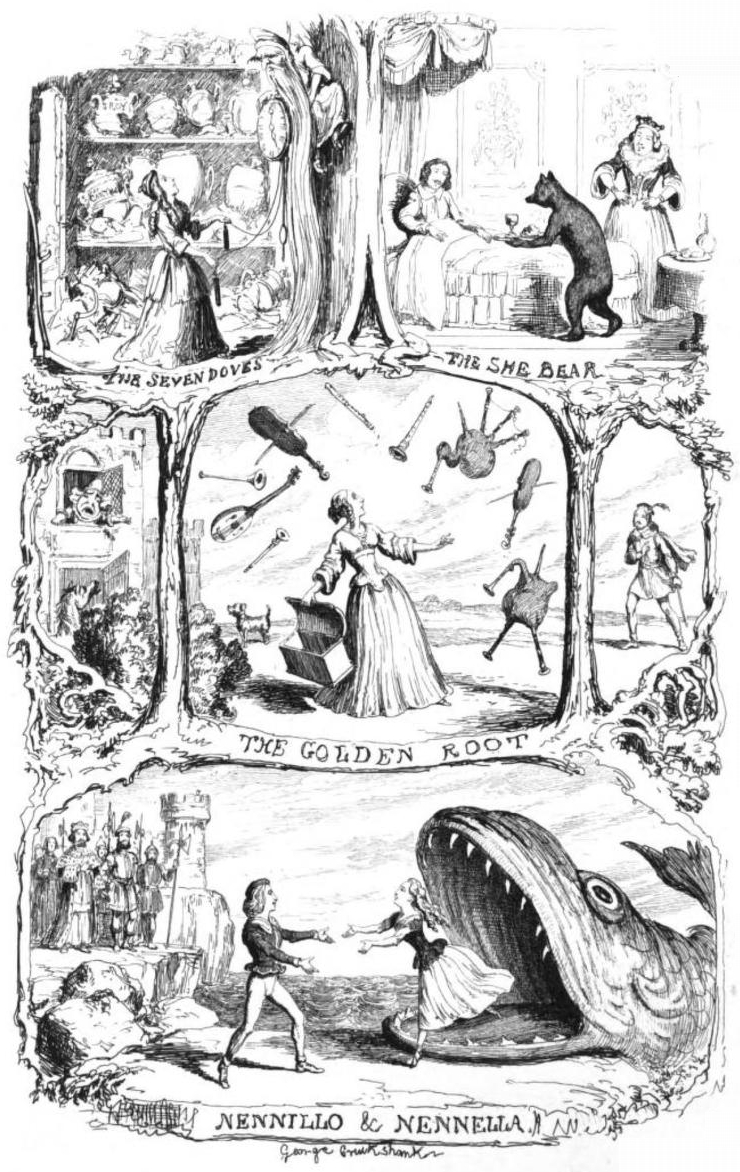
Center-wise: Parmetella opens the box and the instruments fly out of it. Illustration by George Cruikshank for The Story of Stories (1850).

Scholars commonly noticed the resemblance between Parmetella's quest for the box of instruments and Psyche's quest for Persephone's casket, and the result of curiosity for both women. Catalan scholarship located the motif of the box of musical instruments in Greek, Turkish and South Italian variants. In that regard, Swahn, in his study on Cupid and Psyche, remarked that the instruments as the contents of the box are "common" to Mediterranean tradition.

The heroine is also helped by ants to carry grains from one place to the other. A similar event occurs in the myth of Psyche and in other fairy tales, such as The Queen Bee, by the Brothers Grimm. Swedish scholar Jan-Öjvind Swahn remarked that, in tales of "The Search for the Lost Husband" type, the task of sorting seeds or grains occurs in Mediterranean and Near Eastern variants of type ATU 425B, "The Witch's Tasks".

== Variants ==
=== Italy ===
==== Marvizia ====
In a Sicilian tale collected by Giuseppe Pitrè with the title Marvizia, a prince's daughter owns a potted plant that produces a rose with good seeds to eat. A green bird comes and eats the seeds. The girl wants to own this green bird, but the prince's servants fail to catch it. Then, she dons a disguise as a pilgrim and follows the bird to various villages, under the pretense that she is going on a seven year penance. She arrives at a city whose queen misses her son. The queen soon shelters the girl. In return, the girl asks for the queen's ring, a memento of her lost son, as an attempt to reassure her. The queen agrees and the girl pilgrim continues on her journey. She arrives at the house of a mammadraga and asks for lodging. The mammadraga invites her in, calls her Marvizia (from Marva, a mallow plant) and sets her to doing strenuous tasks. First, the girl, Marvizia, has to clean all copper utensils, and confides to the mammadraga's giant servant, Ali. The green bird appears on the window sill and advises the girl. Next, to wash all the mattresses, and finally to weave clothes for the mammadraga. The next day, the mammadraga turns the green bird into a man, and sets her giant servant Ali to take Marvizia to be devoured by goats. Ali meets the green bird, who gives him a magic staff to create grass to satiate the goats. A shepherd girl gives food to mammadraga, who, after thanking her, decides to make the girl her daughter-in-law. The green bird agrees to the mammadraga's decision, but secretly, uses the Ring of Command to materialize a torch with gunpowder and pellets inside. After their marriage, with Marvizia holding the torch on the foot of the bridal bed, the green bird asks for his new wife to hold the torch. The torch explodes on the shepherdess's hands, taking the mammadraga's house with it. Marvizia, the now human green bird and the giant soon attempt to escape from the mammadraga with the Ring and the Book of Command, with the villainess hot in pursuit. The trio eventually escape and meet with the queen who gave Marvizia the ring. Author Woldemar Kaden translated the tale as Pappelröschen ("Poplar Rose"), and commented that this was another variant of the myth of Cupid and Psyche. Ruth Manning-Sanders translated the tale as The Green Bird in her work A Book of Ogres and Trolls.

==== Thunder and Lightning ====
Author Heinrich Zschalig published a tale from the island of Capri with the title Blitz und Donner (Italian: il lampo (ed il) tuono; English: "Thunder and Lightning"): a girl named Rosinella lives with her poor father. One day, she takes her pig to graze in the forest and finds a tree with golden leaves and golden branches. She takes some foliage to her father. They eventually revisits the forest on the next day before they see the tree tumbling down. After the tree falls, they see a staircase leading underground. Her father is reluctant to go down the stairs, but Rosinella soon climbs down the hole and finds a large underground palace. In one of the chambers, Rosinella meets a shadowed being and offers her services to it. The shadow agrees and lets her stay, as long as she does not enter his bedchambers neither during the day nor at night. She obeys his instructions from one year, until she enters his chambers and sees a beautiful youth asleep on the bed. The next morning, the shadowed man reproaches Rosinella, but gives her iron shoes and some figs. He explains that the figs are for his sisters, and that, if she suffers for a year, three months and three weeks, the man, named Thunder and Lightning, will marry her. Rosinella goes to the city and reaches a terrace where the three sisters are and gives them the figs. The sisters welcome her, but warn that their mother, Luisa, is a cannibal and may devour her, but the girl can gain her favour by pulling her hair and forcing her to swear on her son's name. Luisa appears and smells Rosinella's "Christian flesh". Rosinella forces Luisa not to harm her on her son's name. Luisa forces the human girl on difficult tasks: to fill two sacks with feathers and to separate a large heap of mixed seeds. Thunder and Lightning helps her: he summons all birds to give their feathers and an army of ants to separate the seeds. Next, Luisa sends Rosinella to her sister, also a cannibal, with a letter and an order to get a casket from a cabinet. On the way there, the man reappears and tells her that the task is a trap; he gives her a bag full of oatmeal and biscuits, and instructs her to give the oatmeal to the horse and the biscuits to the parrot, get the casket and escape. Rosinella gets the item and, on the way back, opens it, and a flock of birds escapes. The same man uses his magic powers to draw the birds back to the casket. Lastly, Luisa arranges her son's wedding to an ugly woman. Before the ceremony, Thunder and Lightning asks Rosinella for a kiss, but she refuses. The ugly bride confesses that she kissed a pig herder for three nuts. Thunder and Lightning scolds the ugly bride and chooses Rosinella. Luisa, his mother, tired of her defeats, jumps into a well.

==== Cristina and the Monster ====
In an Italian tale first collected by Ciro Marzocchi from Toscana in 1879 with the title Cristina e il Mostro ("Cristina and the Monster"), translated by German scholar Rudolf Schenda with the title Cristina und das Ungeheuer ("Cristina and the Monster"), a mother has three daughters of marriageable age; the youngest, Cristina, is the prettiest of the three, but finds no adequate suitor. One day, the mother consults a magician to learn her youngest daughter's fate. The magician answers that her fate will be the most fortunate of the three sisters, and suggests to take Cristina for a stroll in the mountains, lace her food with opium and, after the girl falls asleep, leave her there and return home which she follows soon after. Cristina eventually wakes up and finds herself in a grand palace, and a voice tells her that the palace and everything in it belongs to her. Time passes, and she wants to visit her family. The voice gives her a magic ring, and warns her not to tell her mother or her sisters about her life. Cristina's mother consults with the magician and learns her daughter is living a life of luxury in the palace of a prince named Cupido, changed into a monster by the work of a Maga (sorceress). Cristina breaks the voice's trust: she lights a candle at night and sees not a monstrous form, but a handsome youth with wings on his shoulders. A bit of wax burns his chest, he wakes up, curses Cristina and disappears. She now has to do penance, so she finds work with the Ungeheuer ("Monster"). The first task given to Cristina is for her is to clear away a mountain top; then to get an egg from its depths. She is soon instructed to go to another mountain filled with tigers and find enough hides to sew a pair of gloves. Cristina's last task is for her to go to hell and get a box from the Devil, without opening it. Cristina gets a box from the devil and stops a bit on the way; she opens the box and a dark fog comes out of it and covers the world in darkness. In this tale, the heroine's helper is an old lady: she waves her wand and the darkness goes back to the box. Schenda noted that the "Ungeheuer" ("Monster") of the tale was clearly the god of love, Cupido, from the ancient fairy tale.

==== Ermenegilda e Cupido ====
Pitrè collected a tale from Tuscany (Garfagnana) with the title Ermenegilda e Cupido, collected from a teller named Rosina Casina. In this tale, a merchant has three daughters, Caterina, Maria and Ermenegilda. Whenever their father went to buy goods, the elder two requested extravagant gifts, while the youngest did not. The merchant loves the youngest more dearly than the elder two, to the latter's jealousy. One day, they commission a crystal chest from a carpenter, draw Ermenegilda to a mountain for a picnic, and shove her inside the chest. The elder sisters return home and abandon their cadette in the mountain. One day, a strong gust of wind blows the chest away to another place, where she exits the chest an enters a palace. Inside the palace, she is served by invisible servants, and a mysterious voice talks to her. She lives with this mysterious character that comes at night to her bed. Ermenegilda asks his name one time, and he answers by "Cupido", then reveals he fears his mother for she will try to separate them. Still living with Cupido, she suspects he might be a monster, so the next time he comes to their bed, she will light a candle to see him. So she does, and finds a handsome youth. He awakes and tells her he feels betrayed, and that she must seek his mother, a sorceress, and warns his wife that his mother is an astute woman. Ermenegilda goes to meet her mother-in-law, who discovers she married her son, so she sends the girl on difficult tasks: first, she orders Ermenegilda to wash a bicoloured piece of cloth to all white in a nearby fountain under three hours; next, she is to separate many feathers and fill a pillow with them, also under three hours. Cupido helps his wife in both tasks. The third task is for Ermenegilda to carry a letter to the sorceress's sister and get from her "i canti, i balli e soni". Cupido gives her some resources for the journey to his aunt's house (four coins, a rope, rags, grease), and advises her how to proceed: she is to pay a ferryman with the coins, give the rope to women by a well, the rags to a woman cleaning an oven with her breasts, and throw grease to some lions; on reaching his aunt's house, she will be greeted by the aunt's children, to whom she is to give some sweets to distract them, give the letter to one of them, steal the box and rush back, but she must not open it, for the box contains small people that dance, play music and sing, which will be difficult to be locked up again. Ermengilda follows the instructions to the letter, gets the box and hurries back to her mother-in-law's house, but, en route, she becomes curious and opens it: little men and little women escape from it and begin to dance, sing and play. Cupido appears to her and brings them back into the box. Succeeding in getting the box, the sorceress sends Ermenegilda again, this time to get a ring. The girl goes through the same path, gets another box with a ring, then goes back. As a last order, the sorceress gives Ermenegilda a letter to be delivered to her sister inviting her to Cupido's wedding. Ermenegilda goes one last time to the sorceress's house, and goes back to Cupido's wedding. Finally, the sorceress forces Ermenegilda to carry ten candles, one on each finger, to her son's wedding to another woman. During the ceremony, Cupido simply takes Ermenegilda with him back to her family in a carriage. At his parents-in-law's house, the elder sisters are surprised at Ermenegilda's survival, but Ermenegilda leaves them be, and marries Cupido in a grand wedding.

==== Cupido, King of the Fairies ====
In an Italian tale collected by Ciro Marzocchi from Sinalunga with the title Cupido re dei Fati ("Cupido, King of the Fairies"), a poor woman has two daughters, one called Nina, and they earn their living by weaving and selling their products. One day, bereft at their poverty, Nina decides to travel the world and earn her own living. The girl departs and reaches a beautiful meadow, where she stops to rest. She hears a voice calling her in her dreams, and wakes up. The voice calls her again and bids her follow it to find happiness. Nina does as asked and arrives at a small hut. The voice welcomes her and says everything belongs to her, but she can never open a certain door in the cellar, lest misery befalls her; if she obeys this one order, she will be most fortunate. Everything she asks for is given, but curiosity get the better of her and, eight days later, she decides to peer into the door. She smears the keyhole with the lamp oil, then opened: inside, a large marble castle. She presses on and goes up a staircase leading into a room, where fairies are preparing clothes for her upcoming wedding to Cupido, and a handsome youth is lying on a bed, Cupido. Nina approaches the sleeping youth to better see him, and a drop of oil falls on his arm. Cupido wakes up with a startle and laments Nina's deed, since he would have married her and made her his queen, but now she must die at his mother's hands. Nina pleads for her life, when Cupido's mother, the Fairy, comes in the room to punish the human girl. Cupido and Nina cry for the girl's fate, and the Fairy says Nina can save herself if she does what the Fairy orders of her: Nina is to go beyond a mountain to the Fairy's sister's castle and give her a letter; while Nina waits for the written answer, the girl is to grab the "scatola dei ballerini" ('a box of dancers') and bring it back. Nina asks Cupido for help, who agrees to guide her, out of love for her. He gives her a magic wand that can teleport her to the mountain. Nina beats the wand in the ground and finds herself near the mountain, where a rusty gate blocks her path. Nina uses the wand again to produce jars of butter she uses to oil the gate doors; next, she climbs up the mountain and finds a woman cleaning an oven without supplies, to whom she gives rags; and a cobbler to whom she gives tools. Finally, she arrives at the Fairy's sister's courtyard where two dogs are prowling, to which she throws some bread she creates with the wand. She meets the Fairy's sister and delivers the letter. While the fairy is occupied with writing a response, Nina steals the box of dancers and hurries all the way down the mountain. The Fairy's sister commands her servants to stop Nina, but she leaves unscathed. Powerless, the Fairy's sister throws herself out of a window. Back to Nina, on the way back to the Fairy, the girl senses something in the box and takes a peek inside: 24 golden puppets spring out of the box, 10 male dolls, 10 female dolls and 4 musicians, and begin to play music and dance. Nina tries to place them inside the box, and even uses the magic wand Cupido gave her, to no avail. Cupido appears to her and, with a nod, summons the puppets back into the box. Nina and Cupido go back to his mother's palace with the box, and the Fairy agrees to marry each other. Nina invites her mother and sister to her wedding, and Nina's sister marries a male fairy ("fato").

==== La Palmierina ====
Alberto Vecchi published a tale from Valle Padana he sourced from his mother and grandmother, about la Palmierina. In this tale, Palmierina is a kind, but poor orphan girl that decides to look for a job. She learns about some ladies needing a maidservant and goes to their location, beyond mountains and forests. When she is near the ladies' place, a gust of wind appears and reveals an old man, who offers to help her. Palmierina continues on until she reaches a castle aop a hill, when the same old man appears again and tells the girl the seven ladies are Fata (fairies), gives the girl a pot of honey and a basket of figs and tells her to drip the fairies' spindle in the honey and figs to gain their favour, but she must stay hidden until they swear on the name of Tronelosna. Palmierina does as the old man instructed and waits as the fairies savour their honeyed spindle, then swear a vow on Tronelosna. The girl comes out of hiding and introduces herself as their new maidservant, so they cast their long braids of hair to pull the girl up to their castle. Palmierina becomes their new maidservant and sweeps the floors and cleans out the windows. One day, the oldest fairy tells Palmierina the fairies will visit a sister and order Palmierina to sort a heap of mixed seeds in the barn into seven sacks of wheat ("frumento"), seven sacks of millet ("miglio") and seven sacks of barley ("orzo"). After the fairies leave, the girl begins the task and separates only a part of the large pile, when the old man appears to her and offers its help: he waves a magic wand and the piles are sorted, which he helps the girl to bag in the sacks. The fairies return and suspect the deed was the work of Tronelosna. Some time later, the fairies announce they will leave again and order Palmierina to refill their mattresses with feathers, but they ask for sparrow feathers. Palmierina attracts some sparrows with grains and catches a few feathers, when the old man appears to help her: they burn a pile of feather and he tells her to shout for the birds to come offer their feathers for the king of birds is dead. Flocks of birds come to shed their feathers, then Palmierina cries out a second time and a second flock appears. The old man dismisses the birds and helps Palmierina stitch the feathers into the mattresses with the wand. The fairies return and again suspect it was the work of Tronelosna.

Later, the fairies tell Palmierina they will hold a ball and order her to go to their sister to fetch a box of musical instruments ("scatla d'i sunaìn", in the original, which Vecchio described as hard to translate and paraphrased as "musical instruments"). As Palmierina begins her trek, the old man appears to her and advises her how to proceed: he gives her two loaves of bread to be given for a dog, a basket of hay for a horse, a piece of bacon to smear on door hinges; she then is to greet the fairies' sister and cradle the doll she will give her, then toss the doll in the oven, grab the box on the fireplace and rush back. Palmierina takes the objects and pacifies the large dog with the bread, the large thin horse with the hay, and the heavy doors with the bacon grease. The fairies' sister greets her, gives the girl the doll she is carrying and goes to another room. As soon as the fairy is away, the girl tosses the doll in the oven, grabs the box and rushes back, with the fairy commanding the doors and the animals to stop her, to no avail. At a distance, as Palmierina goes down the slopes, she hears the music produced by the magic instruments inside the box and decides to open it: out fly tiny musical instruments that hop on the ground. Palmierina tries to get some of them back into the box, but they keep escaping her hands. Tronelosna himself appears, empties the box and waves his magic wand to lock the instruments back into the box. He then tells Palmierina he will attend the ball tomorrow and the girl may recognize him there, but she must stay silent about it, and not light a lamp to see him at night. Palmierina brings back the box and helps the fairies prepare the ball. During the ball, Palmierina holds a lamp to escort the guests inside, and sits by the wall of a well, even seeing someone that looks like Tronelosna during the festivities. After the party is over, the fairies place Palmierina in a different room with two beds, and she sleeps there. Later at night, she feels someone in the other bed, so she lights a lamp to see their face: it is Tronelosna, young and handsome. However, the girl lets a drop of wax fall on his face and he turns to an old man. He admonishes Palmierina, saying she must wait another year to break his curse. The following year, the fairies hold another ball and Palmierina escorts the guests inside. After the festivities, the girl waits in her room for Tronelosna, who comes to the other bed. In the morning, Palmierina notices her companion is Tronelosna, how young and handsome after the breaking of the curse. According to Vecchio, the heroine's helper's name, "Tronelosna", means "thunder and lightning" in the Modenese dialect. Vecchio also compared the story of La Palmierina to the Graeco-Roman myth of Cupid and Psyche.

==== Lampo-Tuono (Vena di Maida) ====
In an Arbereshe (Italian-Albanian) tale titled Llamp’e-Troni, collected from informant Elisabetta Retro in Vina (Vena di Maida) and translated as Lampo-Tuono, three poor sisters live with their mother and forage for herbs, chickory and other vegetables to sell. One day, they enter the Ogre's orchard in search of broccoli. One of the sisters sight a large broccoli and goes to pluck it, but it is actually the Ogre's ear. The Ogre wakes up, reveals himself and orders the girl to come with him, lest he kills her. The girl's sisters return home and tell their mother their sister has been abducted by the Ogre. However, the girl is alive and is living with the Ogre. After three days, she misses home, and the Ogre allows her to pay them a visit, but warns her to come back with him when he appears on a horse. The girl returns home and is questioned by her family about her life with the Ogre; she says that lives in a room, sleeps alone, and is allowed to wander the house, in the morning, but has to return at night to their unlit house. Her sisters give her a bundle of matches and a candle, for her to light up the room at night to better see where she is. The girl returns home with the objects and goes to sleep. On the first night, she does not strike the matches, but on the second day, she lights up the candle and finds a handsome youth next to her in bed. The girl feels frightened and drops the candle on him, burning him. He wakes up and admonishes her, saying that she could not love him, so she will love no one. The following morning, the Ogre expels the girl from his house, cursing that the road for her is filled with thorns and trees.

The girl leaves the Ogre's house and loses her way in the woods, when she finds the same youth she accidentally burned with the candle. He promises to help her, and guides her to the main road, then warns her that his mother and sisters will devour her; when she arrives at their house, they will drop a ball of thread and ask her to return it, swearing on the soul of the broom, the soul of the shovel, and on the soul of the girl's mother. The girl is advised not to return them the yarn, but to wait until they swear on the soul of Llamp'e Troni ("Lampo-Tuono"). It happens thus, and the sisters take her in, but warn that their mother will devour her. The girl asks for help, and the sisters advise her to wait for their mother and press one of her large breasts. The girl does as instructed, and the ogress mother swears on the soul of her daughter, on her son, and on the soul of Lampo-Tuono, and begs to be released. The girl notices that the mention of Lampo-Tuono blocks them from devouring her. Lampo-Tuono arrives and notices that the girl is safe. Back to the Ogress mother, she devises a plan to devours the human girl: first, she wants the girl to go to the storehouse and separate a mixed heap of wheat ("grano") and barley ("orzo"), which the Ogress mixed. The girl cries for the impossibility of the task, when Lampo-Tuono appears, asks what the problem is, then summons ants to separate the grains. After the task is done, the Ogress suspects the girl had Lampo-Tuono's help.

Next, she orders the girl to find seven mattresses and seven pillows and fill them with feathers. The girl cries about where she can find feathers and the plumes, when Lampo-Tuono helps her by summoning the king of the birds, which brings her the feathers. Once again, the Ogress suspects that this was Lampo-Tuono's doing. Still wanting to devour the human, she sends the girl to her sister with a letter written to bring the yeast. Lampo-Tuono intercepts the girl, explains she is being sent to be devoured, and advises her how to proceed: he gives the girl three loaves of bread, three pieces of meat, and a cane, then bend the tree that blocks the road. The girl gives bread to dogs and meat to lions, passes by a fountain and says that she would drink from it, reaches the ogress's sister's house and places the cane, then delivers the letter to the creature. While the ogress's sister goes to fetch the yeast, the girl sees a baby in the cradle, tosses him in the oven, steals the accordion ("lli soni", in the Arbereshe text; "fisarmonica", in the Italian translation) and flees. The ogress returns and asks her servants why they not stopped the girl, but they reply the girl had done them good: the river says that she built a bridge over it to cross it.

The Ogress still suspects Lampo-Tuono had a hand in this. Next, the Ogress arranges Lampo-Tuono's wedding with a niece, and orders the girl to set the table and ready everything from her return from the wedding. The girl cries; Lampo-Tuono says he forgot a wallet back home which their servant can steal, rushes home and gives the human girl a magic wand which she uses to prepare the table. At night, Lampo-Tuono lies in bed with his wife, while the girl rests near a trapdoor. Lampo-Tuono asks the girl and his wife to trade places, so that his wife is lying near the trapdoor. The wife falls through the trapdoor and the Ogress devours her. The creature meets her son to gloat that she got rid of the human girl, but Lampo-Tuono reveals she devoured her own niece. Later, Lampo-Tuono's human wife is pregnant, but the Ogress has cast a curse to prevent her daughter-in-law from giving birth by placing her hands in her hair. Lampo-Tuono gathers some eleven or fifteen boys to shout that Lampo-Tuono is dead, so they pass by the Ogress's house to lie that her son is dead. The Ogress believes the lie and removes her hands from her hair, thus allowing her daughter-in-law to give birth to her son. The Ogress believes that her son is dead, but he reveals he is alive. Lampo-Tuono and his wife live happily. The tale was also classified as type AT 425B.

==== Palmuccella ====
Italian anthropologist Antonio De Nino collected a tale from Abruzzo with the title Palmuccella, a young woman named Palmuccella is hounded by her stepmother, and consults with her grandmother. Her grandmother gives her a ball of yarn, a walnut and a fig. Palmuccella then leaves her house when her stepmother is asleep, throws the yarn and unravels it. She eventually reaches a house where a woman is working with her spindle, which she drops. Palmuccella ties a walnut into the spindle, which the woman ropes back to her and eats the fruit. The woman drops the spindle twice more, and twice more Palmucella ties a fruit in it (the second time, a chestnut, and the third time, the fig). After the woman eats the fruits, she questions who is the one doing this "kindness" to her, and Palmuccella appears to her. The old woman takes her in, and she works doing chores in the house. However, the old woman's son, Tuoni e Lampi, falls in love with Palmuccella, so the old woman begins to hound her. First, she gives her a basket and orders the girl to carry water in it. Palmuccella goes to the well to fill up the basket, but it leaks water. She begins to cry, when Tuoni e Lampi appears to her and asks for a kiss. Palmuccella replies to him with two verses, saying that would rather be thrown in a river than kiss him. Still, he helps her by touching the basket, so it does not leak anymore. Palmuccella brings back the basket, but the old woman suspects that this was not Palmuccella's work. Later, the old woman forces Tuoni e Lampi to marry another lady, and decides to toss Palmuccella inside a boiling cauldron. Meanwhile, Tuoni e Lampi is in a room with his bride while Palmuccella holds a candle. Tuoni e Lampi asks Palmuccella for a kiss, but she denies him again by saying she would rather be eaten by dogs than to kiss him. Then his bride says that she kissed the cauldron maker for a cauldron, the lacemaker for some beautiful lace, and the ribbon seller for some ribbons. After listening to his bride's confession, Tuoni e Lampi grabs her and tosses her into the cauldron, and marries Palmuccella.

==== Other tales ====
Gennaro Finamore summarized a tale from Abruzzo named Lu fatte de Ggijje-me’-bbèlle. In this tale, a woman has a son and a step-daughter. Disliking her step-daughter, the woman forces the girl on impossible tasks. The woman's son, named Ggijje-me’-bbèlle, offers his help to the girl, his step-sister, in exchange for a kiss. One day, the woman sends her step-daughter to get the scàttele de le sunarjielle, and Ggijje-me’-bbèlle advises the girl on how to reach it. Eventually, the woman marries her son to another bride, and forces the step-daughter to hold ten candles on her fingers during the wedding night. The girl bears the burning, and Ggijje-me’-bbèlle wishes to help her. Ggijje-me’-bbèlle's bride mocks the girl's suffering and confesses that she kissed the hands of the milkman for some figs and a glass of milk. Ggijje-me’-bbèlle kills the bride and eventually marries his step-sister.

== See also ==
- The King of Love
- Prince Wolf (Danish fairy tale)
- Tulisa, the Wood-Cutter's Daughter (Indian fairy tale)
- The Horse-Devil and the Witch
- Graciosa and Percinet (French literary tale)
- Habrmani
- Khastakhumar and Bibinagar
- Yasmin and the Serpent Prince
- Amewakahiko soshi
