= John Stuart of Inchbreck =

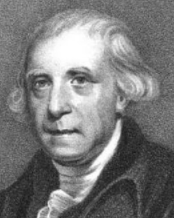
Prof John Stuart of Aberdeen University

John Stuart of Inchbreck FRSE FSA(Scot) (1751–1827) was an 18th/19th century Scottish scholar. He was one of the joint founders of the Royal Society of Edinburgh in 1783.

== Life ==
He was born at Castletown in the Mearns in 1751, the second son of Dr John Stuart of Inchbreck (b.1744) and his first wife, Elizabeth Lawson. The family estate was Inchbreck House near Glenbervie. He was educated at Glenbervie then Arbuthnott school. His older brother, Dr David Stuart, initially inherited the Inchbreck estate.

In 1766 he began to study law at Aberdeen University. He continued this for several years including an apprenticeship as a lawyer in Edinburgh. However, an aggravated knee injury plagued him, and around 1771 the leg had to be amputated. He thereafter diverted his interest from Law to Divinity and returned to Aberdeen University to retrain. He initially intended to join the Church of Scotland as a minister. He was licensed to preach in 1775. He originally was minister of Fordoun. He also preached in the neighbouring parishes of Kinneff, Arbuthnott and Dunottar.

In 1782 he became Professor of Greek at Marischal College in Aberdeen in place of the late Prof William Kennedy.

In 1802 he was involved in the private prosecution of officials who had shot and killed several persons during a riot on Castle Street on the occasion of the King's birthday (4 June). The prosecution was made against the individual soldiers firing (rather than their commanding officer, as would now be the more logical subject). The prosecution was unsuccessful but Prof Stuart published a 200-page summary to at least demonstrate to the public that they had tried to address the charges.

In 1818 he brought in Alexander Leith Ross to take over some of his lecturing duties. He retired fully in 1820.

He died at his Aberdeen residence, 82 Broad Street on 27 August 1827.

== Family ==
He married Margaret Mowat, daughter of George Mowat, an Aberdeen merchant.

He was father of George Andrew Stuart FRSE, Alexander Stuart of Laithers and John Stuart Stuart-Glennie.

== Publications ==
- The Life of Duncan Liddel (1790)
- Historical Account of Marischal College and the University of Aberdeen (1798)
- Essays Chiefly on Scottish Antiquities
