= Filek-Zelebi =

Modern Greek folktale from Crete

Filek-Zelebi (Greek: Φιλέκ-Τζελεμπί, romanized: Philek-Tzelempí) is a modern Greek folktale from Crete, collected by Austrian consul Johann Georg von Hahn and published in the 19th century, in that a maiden marries a mysterious youth who has a padlock on his body; the maiden opens it and finds people inside it, which causes her husband to banish her; she later takes shelter with her sisters-in-law and gives birth to a son with a padlock on his body.

The tale is related to the international cycle of the Animal as Bridegroom or The Search for the Lost Husband, in that a human girl marries a supernatural or enchanted husband, loses him and must search for him. Similar stories have been collected from oral tradition across the Mediterranean, in Greece and Asia Minor, and in North Africa.

== Summary ==
An old woman lives in poverty with her three daughters and earns her living by gathering and selling herbs. One day, when she is tired, she utters a sigh ("Oh"! or "Ah!"), and, suddenly, a Moor appears to her and asks why she summoned him. The old woman denies summoning him, but tells him about her three daughters. The Moor asks for the woman to bring her eldest to him; the elder goes to live with the Moor and is given a human head on a plate as her dinner. She throws the head away, and the Moor takes her back to her mother. The second daughter fares similarly, but with a human leg. When it the youngest's turn, she hides the cannibalistic delight (a human hand) under her clothes to trick the Moor.

The Moor accepts her as his mate and they live like husband and wife, but every night, the girl is given a sleeping potion, so that she cannot see who is really standing at her bedside. Some time later, her family pays her a visit, and she tells them about the mysterious person that comes in the night. Her sisters then convince her to pretend to drink the potion and to spy on her husband. That same night, she follows her sisters' suggestion; beside her, she notices a handsome youth with a golden padlock and a golden key on his chest. She opens the lock on his chest and sees a lush landscape, with a woman washing clothes in a river and a pig nearby. The girl raises her voice to warn the woman about the pig, and it wakes up her husband. The man tells his wife she is pregnant, and, when she gave birth, his curse would have been lifted, for his true form is Filek-Zelebi, not the Moor. He then tells her to wear three pairs of iron shoes, find three golden apples, climb a mountain and toss one of the apples down the mountain; she must follow the apple to his eldest sister's house.

She follows his instructions and pays a visit to her three sisters-in-law: in each house, they are weaving and preparing for the birth of their nephew. At the last house, the youngest sister-in-law welcomes the girl, who is now in labour, and she gives birth that same night to a boy with a golden lock on his chest. The sister-in-law recognizes that the boy is truly her nephew, the son of her brother, and Filek-Zelebi appears to them.

== Analysis ==
=== Tale type ===
According to the Greek Folktale Catalogue, the tale is classified as subtype 425L. In this type, the heroine gives birth to a child that looks like her husband (e.g., with a padlock on his body), and they reconcile. In addition, Greek subtype 425L may begin with a father asking his three daughters what presents he can bring them from a trip and, not finding it, utters a sigh; the sigh summons an Arab or dark-skinned person, who is the enchanted husband's servant.

However, German folklorist Hans-Jörg Uther, in his 2004 revision of the international Aarne-Thompson-Uther Index, subsumed type AaTh 425L under new type ATU 425E. In type ATU 425E, the heroine's husband has a padlock on his body; after she betrays his trust and opens the padlock, she is expelled and takes shelter in a castle where she gives birth to their child.

=== Motifs ===
Scholar Jan-Öjvind Swahn, in his monograph about Cupid and Psyche, remarked that the heroine's pregnancy was an "essential" trait of subtype AaTh 425L. On the other hand, scholars Anna Angelopoulou and Aigle Broskou, editors of the Greek Folktale Catalogue, indicated that the "characteristic motif" of subtype 425L is that the heroine, against her husband's prohibition, illuminates his face and discovers a lock on his body that leads to a whole other world. In this regard, according to Richard McGillivray Dawkins, in Turkish and Greek variants, the husband's padlock leads the heroine to a place where clothes are being washed and linen is being woven in connection with her marriage to the supernatural husband.

==== The mysterious servant ====
According to Richard MacGillivray Dawkins, in Greek variants, the mysterious servant may be a "blackamoor" or pasha, summoned by uttering an interjection ("Alas" or "Woe is me"). The mysterious servant may also subject the heroine and her sisters to a dish of rotten human flesh they must eat.

According to Luisa Rubini, the motif of the character uttering an interjection and accidentally summoning a mysterious servant with the same name is "typical" of Mediterranean tales (from Italy, the Balkans and Turkey).

==== The husband's name ====
In a study about the myth of Cupid and Psyche, Danish folklorist Inger Margrethe Boberg argues that the word "Zelebi" (Τζελεμπί) is Turkish çelebi, a honorific. In the same vein, Richard M. Dawkins suggested that the name Filek could be derived from the "Turco-Arabic" felek; thus, the husband's name may mean "Lord Sky".

== Variants ==
=== Greece ===
According to the Greek Folktale Catalogue, type 425E is "popular" in Turkey and Greece, while type 425L is known across the Greek Agean Islands and in Asia Minor.

==== The Lord of the Underearth ====
French Hellenist Émile Legrand translated into French a Greek tale with the title Le Seigneur du Monde Souterrain, which was also translated by author Lucy Mary Jane Garnett as The Lord of the Underearth. In this tale, an old man is gathering firewood, when he stops to rest on a stump and sighs aloud ("allímono", in the original). A Black man appears and asks why the man summoned him, but the latter denies it. The Black man then asks the man if he has any daughters, and asks to bring him the eldest girl. The girl is brought to the Black man, who takes her to a lush garden. They sit for lunch and he serves her a rotten human foot, which she is to eat if she if to become the wife of the Lord of the Underearth. The girl refuses the "food" and tosses it in the ashpit. The Black man delivers her back to the old man and takes the second daughter, to whom he offers a rotten human hand. The second girl also refuses it. Lastly, he takes the youngest with him and serves her a human stomach. The girl, cunningly, asks the man to get some seasoning for her delicacy. While the Black man is away, she wraps the food in her stomach with a girdle and fools the Black man. Soon after, she lives with the Black man as her servant: he gives her some coffee laced with a sleeping potion, and she never sees her husband, the Lord of the Underearth. Some time later, her sisters realize she never returned, and ask her father to summon the Black man. It happens so: the old man tells the Black man his daughters miss their sister, and the Black man bids he brings them with him the next time. The elder sisters pay her a visit and convince her that the Black man is not her husband, but there must be someone else with her at night; she just has to pretend to drink the potion, feign sleep, and turn the key on her husband's navel, then she can see "Constantinople, Smyrna, the whole world". The girl follows her sisters' advice and feigns sleep; while the Lord of the Underearth is asleep, she turns the key on his navel and sees the whole world. Inside, she notices a woman washing her wool in the river, and shouts at her the water is carrying it off. The Lord of the Underearth wakes up and insults his wife, then orders his Black servant to pluck two of the hairs on her head, place it in basin, give bread to his wife and send her away. The Black servant follows his master orders, and banishes the girl into the wide world. The tale then continues with the girl's adventures in male disguise. Richard M. Dawkins also translated the tale as Human Flesh to Eat, and named the supernatural husband "The Lord of the World Below".

==== The Sun and His Wife ====
Greek scholar Georgios A. Megas published a Greek tale originally titled in Modern Greek: Ὁ Ἥλιος κ' ἡ γυναῖκα του, romanized: O Elios k' é gynaïka tou, which was translated into German as Der Sonnenball und seine Frau and into English as The Sun and His Wife. In this tale, a poor old man has three daughters and tries to feed his family by hunting. During a hunt, he loses sight of a hare and sighs heavily. His three daughters ask him the motive of his sadness, the elder daughters dismiss his concerns, but the youngest comforts him. Some time later, he enters the forest again and, failing to find any good game, sighs aloud "Alas and alack". Suddenly, a "very black blackamoor" appears and questions why the old man summoned him, since his name is Alasandalack, but the man denies having done so. The black man asks the old man which of his daughters he the best, to which the latter answers: the youngest. The black man then explains he is the servant of the Sun, and is to take the girl as the Sun's bride. The old man agrees to his terms and convinces his youngest daughter to accompany the blackamoor to the Sun's abode. The girl marries the Sun and becomes pregnant as time passes, but she has never seen his face, since she is always given a sleeping potion before bedtime. One day, his sisters pay her a visit, and convince her to spy on her husband at night: they give her a sponge so it can soak up the drink, then she is to feign sleep, and light a candle to better see his face. The girl follows her sisters' advice: while the Sun is asleep, the girl takes "from inside his head" three gold hairs and a golden padlock with a golden key. She turns the key and enters it; inside, wonders and all manners of things. She sees many workshops where the labourers are weaving clothes for the Sun's wife and their unborn child. The girl leaves the padlock and locks it, but a drop of candlewax falls on the Sun's body and burns him. The Sun wakes up in anger and orders his servant, Alasandalack, to take the girl to the wilderness, kill her, and bring back her blood for him to drink. However, Alasandalack disobeys his orders and spares her, directing her to a forest where his master's sister dwells. The girl follows his directions and utter her husband's name; her sister-in-law welcomes her. This repeats twice more, until the girl reaches her third sister-in-law, a lamia (a man-eating ogress), who takes her in just as she is ready to give birth. The girl gives birth to a boy with a golden padlock on his heart, whom the lamia recognizes as her brother's son, the Sun. The Sun appears soon after at his sister's house.

==== Other tales ====
German Hellenist Louis Roussel collected an untitled tale from Mykonos. In this tale, a poor old man has three daughters who beg for alms to feed the family, but they can only obtain enough bread for a meagre meal. One day, in a bout of sadness, his youngest daughter comes in with a handful of coins and explains where she found them: while she was in a meadow trying to pluck a vegetable from the ground, she sighed aloud "Oh, Alis", when a Black man appears, gives her some money and bids her accompany him to a hut. The old man is sad for his daughter, but accompanies her to the place where she met the Black man. The Black man appears, gives the old man more money and says his daughter is in good hands. After she says goodbye to her father, the girl joins the Black man inside the hut, where she is told she will dwell with the Black man and obeys his orders. Time passes, and she has her meals alone and sleeps alone on a bed. After some four or five months, she begins to miss home and asks the Black man if she can visit her family. The Black man allows it, but sets a time limite of three hours. The girl pays a visit to her family, and her mother notices the girl is pregnant. The girl says she cannot be, since she sleeps alone at night. Her mother then advises her to avoid drinking whatever she is offered at night. The girl returns to the hut, avoids drinking the potion, and pretends to fall asleep. Soon, a handsome youth joins her in bed, but leaves at the crack of dawn. The girl is reminded of the Black man's words not to say anything about what she sees. After three nights, the girl cannot contain her happiness and embraces her companion, admiring him. The man wakes up and slaps her, then says he is lost to her, and has to walk on iron shoes to find him. The Black man takes the pregnant girl outside the hut and admonishes her, but gives her directions to reach a house that belongs to her sister-in-law. The girl walks to the first mansion, but is rebuffed by her sister-in-law. She keeps walking until she reaches another house, whose lady, a princess, takes her in. The girl gives birth to her son. Some time later, the husband comes to the village and asks the lady of the house if she harboured a girl with them. The princess nods, and shows her the girl and his son. They reunite, rewards the princess with money, and takes his wife and son with him back to the hut. He leaves her with the Black man and departs. The Black man says it was her first and only time she talked, and she remains silent. The tale ends.

=== Europe ===
==== Albania ====
Richard MacGillivray Dawkins reported an unpublished Albanian tale wherein the enchanted husband is served by "a black spirit" and has a lock on his stomach; the heroine opens the lock and sees a marketplace, where the people are preparing clothes for her future child; the heroine is expelled from home, but gives birth to a boy with a lock on his stomach, just like his father.

==== North Macedonia ====
In a Judeo-Spanish variant collected in Skoplje with the title Le cadenadico ("The Little Padlock"), a king goes on a journey and asks which presents he can bring his daughters: the elder two ask for robes, while the youngest asks for a bunch of golden grapes for her. His cadette, however, curses his path to "fall into darkness" if he does not find her gift. He journeys and buys the robes to his elder two, but cannot buy the golden grapes. This causes him to lose his way into the darkness, until he reaches the foot of a mountain, where a black genie (or black man) appears to the king. The monarch tells the black man about the gift, and the black man explains it originates from another world, but he can give it to the king in exchange for the third princess, who will come to be with him. The black man transports the princess with him to a desert, and leads her to a palace. The princess is visited at night by someone she cannot see, for she is blindfolded. In time she becomes pregnant. After a while, she begins to miss home and comments with the black man she wishes to return home for a visit, which is agreed upon, but only for three days. At home, her mother gives her matches to better see her husband at night. She lights a match and discovers a handsome man next to her. and sees a padlock on the man lying in bed next to her. She turns the key and enters it: inside, a beautiful garden and a world of people preparing for the birth of her unborn child. The man with the padlock sleeps until noon and complains to his black servant about, then enters the garden inside the padlock to question the weaving girls if anyone was there with them. The girls reveal the princess was there before. The man with the padlock discovers the princess's betrayal and orders the black genie, his servant, to kill her and bring her shirt soaked with the blood of her little finger as proof of the deed. However, the black servant spares her life and directs her to a meadow with three doors, where she can find shelter. She is treated as a beggar woman by the first two hosts, and reaches the house of her husband's brother. The girl, pregnant, takes shelter gives birth to a son with a padlock on his body, just like his father. The third door's lady calls her husband, who is princess's brother-in-law, and he notices the mark on the baby, the same as his brother's, which makes the child his brother's son. The princess and the man with the padlock reconcile. Anna Angelopoulous stated that the tale was a "regional Balkanic version" of Cupid and Psyche.

==== Romania ====
Romanian scholar Lazar Saineanu provided the summary of a Romanian tale collected by author Petre Ispirescu. In this tale, titled Fětů frumosă şi fata negustorului ("Fat-Frumos and the Merchant's Daughter"), before he leaves on a journey, a merchant asks his three daughters what presents he can bring them: the elder asks for a present the colour of the sky, the middle one for something of silk, and the third for a knife entirely green. The merchant buys the first two items, but cannot seem to find the green knife and sighs. Suddenly, an Arab appears to him, and asks why he was summoned. The Arab promises to give the green knife to the merchant in exchange for the third daughter, who is to be blindfolded and given to his master, an enchanted prince. A deal is made, and the merchant's youngest daughter is delivered to the Arab and taken to a palace, where she is waited on and given food and drinks. She is also given a sleeping potion; she drinks and falls asleep. The next day, she realizes that someone has joined her in bed. Sometime later, she begins to miss home, and asks the Arab to be allowed to visit her family. She goes back home and tells her mother about her new living arrangements, and her mother advises her to pretend to be asleep and to have a light source next to her to see who is her mysterious bedmate. The girl follows her mother's instructions and lights up a candle: next to her, a man with a key on his head and a padlock on his navel. She takes a peek inside the padlock and sees a large yard where everyone was making arrangements for the child she is going to have. The girl then brings the candle next to her bedmate's face and sees a handsome youth, but a drop of wax falls on his body and wakes him up. The prince senses his wife betrayed him, and orders his Arab servants to kill her and bring her eyes as proof of their deed. The Arab servants, however, take pity on her and let her go. The girl, pregnant, wanders off until she reaches a palace that belongs to her sister-in-law. She is given shelter, and sees that her husband comes to visit his sister. The girl then leaves and arrives at the palace of his second sister-in-law, then lastly to her youngest sister-in-law, where she is also given shelter. The enchanted prince comes in and explains to his youngest sister the whole story, while the girl is giving birth to her child, a boy with a key on the front, a padlock on the navel, the sun on his chest, the moon on his back and the Morning Star on his shoulders. The enchanted prince recognizes the boy as his son and the woman as his wife, and they reconcile. Romanian scholarship classified the tale as type AT 425L.

=== Asia ===
==== Turkey ====
A similar narrative is attested in the Typen türkischer Volksmärchen ("Turkish Folktale Catalogue"), devised by scholars Wolfram Eberhard and Pertev Naili Boratav, indexed as type TTV 104, Die Traube II, with 14 variants registered. In the Turkish tale type, a father asks his three daughters what presents he can bring them, and the youngest asks for something unique; the girl is given to a mysterious man as his wife; one night, she lights up a candle and finds a padlock on his body; she is banished from their marital home and takes shelter with her sisters-in-law.

In a Turkish tale collected by Turkologist Ignác Kúnos with the title Der Schlangen-Prinz ("The Snake-Prince"), a poor broom-maker has three daughters and earns their living by selling brooms. One day, he stops to sit on a stone in the woods and utters a loud sigh. Suddenly, the stone opens up and an Arab appears to him, saying he was summoned. The broom-maker denies having summoned him, but pours out his woes to the man, who is the Snake-Prince's lala. The Arab man gives him a sack of gold and suggests the broom-maker brings his daughters to him, one at a time. The Arab submits the girls to a test: they are given a sherbet laced with a sleeping potion so they fall asleep, then the Arab will prickle her foot with a needle. The elder two avoid eating the sherbet and have their feet prickled by a needle, screaming in pain, while the youngest falls asleep and does not feel a thing. The Arab sends them back, but keeps the youngest as his master's potential bride. The Arab sleeps by the girl's side for 40 nights, while she lies asleep on the bed. Whenever the youth appears, he hides a set of keys under the cushion, which the girl takes to open 40 doors. Behind the last one she sees a garden where a pair is asleep: a youth with a girl next to him, and a cradle nearby. The human girl places a shawl on the girl then leaves. The asleep girl, the daughter of the Padishah of the Peris, wakes up, sees the shawl and accuses her companion of consorting with a human, then flies away. The youth goes to live with the human girl, but, one night, she does not drink her sherbet and feigns sleep. She turns to her bedmate and sees a padlock on his navel; she opens it and sees inside a great Tscharschi filled with people making cushions and carpets for the girl's unborn child she will bear to the snake prince. The human girl leaves the padlock and closes it again, but the snake prince, in human form, realizes his wife opened the padlock and orders his Arab servant to expel her from his palace. The girl, pregnant, wanders off until she reaches a Seraj that belongs to her elder sister-in-law, who does not welcome her. This repeats again with the second sister-in-law, but her husband's youngest sister takes her in just as she is ready to give birth. The third sister-in-law notices that the child, a boy, has a padlock on his navel, just like his father. Meanwhile, the snake prince, regretting his actions, goes after his human wife and pays a visit to his three sisters, in hopes of finding her again. At last, he arrives at his youngest sister's palace and leaves his snakeskin outside. Inside the palace, the human girl is advised by her sister-in-law to take the snakeskin and burn it, while he is occupied with his sister. It happens thus, and the snake prince, fully human, reconciles with his human wife.

In a Turkish tale from Van, collected from teller Huriye Koç with the title Göbeği Kilitti Padişah ("The Padishah with the Lock on the Belly"), a girl is embroidering in her garden when a bird appears and tells her to grow beautiful, for it will take her. The girl comments with her mother about it. Time passes, and the bird returns with the same words. The girl agrees to fly with the bird and is taken to a richly furnished mansion. The bird turns into an old woman who offers her some sherbet, which makes the girl sleep. They move the girl to a bed and in enters a padishah's son. Later, the bird-old woman offers to take the girl to her parents' garden, and the girl agrees. The girl returns to her parents' home, who are glad to find her alive. Her family asks her many questions and realize she is pregnant, but she does not the father's identity, so her mother gives her a cotton for her to avoid eating the sherbet late at night. The bird brings her back to the mansion and the old woman gives some sherbet, which the girl drops into the cotton. She feigns sleep, and notices a youth by her side, with a lock on his belly. She opens the lock and enters it: inside, she finds a marketplace where weavers are weaving clothes for the padishah's son's child and carpenters fashioning cradles. The girl leaves the marketplace and eats some grapes from a bowl. However, a drop of fruit juice falls on the youth's body and wakes him up. He summons the old woman and orders his servant to abandon his wife elsewhere, despite the servant's reservations. However, the old woman takes the pregnant girl and directs her to the house of the padishah's son's sister, where she can find shelter. She puts a disguise on the girl, who leaves for her sister-in-law's house. She is given shelter. In time, she is ready to give birth to her child. The padishah's son's sister realizes her guest is pregnant and sends for a midwife who helps in the delivery of the baby, who is born with a lock on his belly like his father. The sister-in-law notices the resemblance between the baby and her brother, and confronts her brother about it when he comes to talk to her. The padishah with a lock on his belly reunites with his wife and son and takes them back to his mansion.

==== Iraq ====
Russian professor V. A. Yaremenko published an Iraqi tale titled "Золотая гроздь" ("Golden Cluster" or "The Golden Bunch"). In this tale, a man has seven daughters, and is ready to go on a pilgrimage (hajj). Before he departs, he asks what presents he can bring his daughters: the youngest asks or a "golden cluster of grapes". After doing his affairs in the hajj and buying gifts for his six elder daughters, his ship cannot leave the port. The man then realizes he forgot the gift for his youngest: the golden cluster of grapes. Suddenly, a "tall and black" marid appears on the ship and shows him the golden cluster, and offers it to the man in exchange for his youngest daughter. After some initial reluctance, the man agrees to the terms and goes back home with the cluster to give it to his daughter, with a heavy heart. The girl asks her father the reason for his sadness, and is told of the encounter with the marid. The girl agrees to leave with the marid, who appears to take her and her belongings to a distance palace. The marid and the girl enter the palace and he shows her its six rooms, but forbids her from opening a seventh. They settle into a routine: every night, the girl is given a drink laced with some sleeping potion and she senses someone coming to her bed. She feels she is pregnant, but realizes that the marid calls her "mistress", not "wife". Suspecting something is amiss, she gives the marid her drink and he falls asleep. She notices a set of keys around the marid's neck, steals it and uses it to open the seventh door. Inside, she finds a man asleep on a bed, and with a padlock on his chest. She turns the key on the padlock and sees a bunch of toys for her unborn child, then closes it, but pinches the man's skin. The mysterious man wakes up and admonishes the girl, who replies that she is his wife. Still enraged, he summons his marid servant and orders him to take his wife and banish her to a desert. The marid obeys his master's orders and flies with the girl to a desert. The girl, pregnant, wanders off until she finds a light in the distance: it is an illuminated castle that belongs to one of her husband's sisters. She manages to be received by her sister-in-law, but escapes as soon as her husband enters the castle. The situation repeats with a second sister-in-law, until she at last reaches the castle of his younger sister, who welcomes her. Later, the husband comes to the castle to have a talk with his sister, who scolds him about not trusting his wife and relying on the deception with the marid. On hearing this, the marid's master feels a pang of compassion for his wife, enters her chambers and they reconcile.

Yaremenko published another Iraqi tale, which he sourced from a Kurdish village in Northern Iraq. In this tale, titled "Фильфиль Дару" ("Filfil Daru"), a merchant from Sulaymaniyah is ready to go to Lebanon on a business trip, and asks his three daughters, Zarifa, Fatima and Juwana, what he can bring them: Zarifa asks for a silk dress, Fatima for a pet bird, and Juwana for something called "filfil daru", which is very expensive. After a long journey, he reaches Lebanon and finds the dress and the bird for his elder daughters, but not this "filfil daru". It turns out that "Filfil Daru" is the prince's name, and the man is summoned to his presence to explain the story. Prince Filfil Daru tells the merchant to prepare the latter's house for his arrival, for he will arrive by plane to visit Juwana. It happens thus and, on a certain night, FIlfil Daru appears by Juwana's window on a plane and takes the girl to his majestic palace, where they live together. However, Juwana is forbidden to open three door, for they belong to her husband only, and is given a laban to drink and fall asleep every night. Time passes, and she begins to miss home. Filfil Daru allows her to visit her family. Juwana talks to her family, who advise her to spill the sleeping drink and let him drink the laban. The girl follows through with the suggestions and Filfil Daru falls asleep on their bed, which opens a window for Juwana to get a set of keys on his belt and open the forbidden doors: inside the first room, a carpenter making a cradle for the prince's unborn child; inside the second, a woman sewing clothes for the child; inside the third, a cook preparing food for the prince's child. After closing the doors, Juwana rushes back to Filfil Daru's sleeping frame to return the keys, but, suddenly, he wakes up and berates her for breaking his trust. He then orders his chief executioner to take the girl, kill her and bring back a bottle of her blood. The servant takes Juwana to a deserted place to fulfill the ghastly order, but the girl pleads for her life and the executioner lets her go and kills a dove in her place. Now alone and wandering aimlessly, Juwana manages to find nearby three identical houses. She knocks on the first one and asks for shelter, but the mistress of the house serves her salty food and expels her, shouting that her brother Filfil Daru will soon come with his wife. The same thing happens to the second house. With the third, Filfil Daru's sister welcomes Juwana and prepares accommodations for her, just as she is ready to give birth. Filfil Daru appears soon after to pay his sister a visit. She comes from Juwana's room and tells her brother about a poor woman who gave birth to a boy with a mark on his body in the shape of three keys. Filfil Daru realizes that his son was born and finds Juwana in her room.

=== Africa ===
Anna Angelopoulous stated that type AaTh 425L also exists in North Africa.

==== Egypt ====
Scholar Hasan M. El-Shamy collected a tale from a teller who lived in a Nubian village in Southern Egypt. In this tale, titled The Sultan of the Underwater, a childless woman goes to the river Nile and prays to God to have a daughter and she will fulfill a vow. A daughter is born to her. Years later, the girl tells her mother that whenever she goes to the river, a rock pinches her and tells her to remind her mother of her vow. The woman takes her daughter to the river and sits her on the stone. Suddenly, the stone sinks into the earth and takes her to the king of the underwater, since the stone was his slave. The girl lives with the king of the underwater, but is given a sleeping potion every night before she goes to bed. Some time later, a crow warns the girl that her mother died. The sultan gives her a purse of gold and orders the slave to take her to visit her mother. The mother is not dead, after all, and the girl spends three days with her. Some female neighbours mock the girl for the black slave that is accompanying her, since they think he is her husband. This happens a second time, and the girl tells her neighbours she is given a sleeping potion after supper, so she does not see her husband at night. The neighbours then advise her to toss the drink and feign sleep. It happens thus: the girl discovers her husband is a "fair-complexioned" man, with a locked door on his thigh. The girl opens the key on the door and enters it; inside, goldsmiths, upholsterers and cabinetmakers. Suddenly, the sultan of the underwater realizes his wife is inside the door and pulls her out, banishing her. She wanders off until she passes by the palaces of her three sisters-in-law: the elder two do acknowledge her as their brother's wife, but push her away; the youngest welcomes to her palace, where she gives birth to a boy looking like his father. Later, the sultan of the underwater pays a visit to his three sisters in search of his wife.

==== Algeria ====
Author Joseph Desparmet collected a North African tale titled Aïcha, la Fille du Bûcheron ("Aïcha, the Daughter of the Woodcutter"). In this tale, a poor woodcutter lives with his wife and three daughters. One day, when the elder daughter goes to the kitchen to fetch some plates, a giant Black man appears to her and asks her to marry him - the tale explains the Black man is acting on behalf of his master. The elder daughter answers no to him. The middle daughter is also sent to fetch the plate of food and meets the Black man, whom she also rebuffs. Lastly, the youngest daughter goes to the kitchen and meets the Black man. She is also made the marriage proposal, and she agrees, but first she brings the food to her parents, and goes back to the Black man. The man makes her close her eyes and teleports themselves to a magnificent golden palace. At night, she is given a sleeping potion and falls into a profound sleep. She lives in the golden palace, filled with things fit for a queen. Later, the Black man takes Aïcha to visit her family, and her sisters think the Black man is her husband, and mock her for it. Aïcha, in return, says the Black man gives her a drink and she falls asleep, and she tells them she lives in a splendid palace. Driven by envy of their cadette's luck, they give her a candle and suggest she kindles it at night before she goes to bed. The Black man takes her back to his master's palace, the Sultan of the Genies, and Aïcha avoids drinking the sleeping potion. On the bed, the girl lights the candle and sees her mysterious bedmate: a man wrapped in a heavy caftan. She unbuttons the caftan, one button at a time, and on each button there is people doing something: on the first, some girls weaving a golden brocade; on the second, women preparing couscous; on the third, women plucking feathers from chickens; on the fourth, people eating sheep; and so on. Aïcha takes some time seeing each button and drops some wax on the sleeping man, who wakes up and chastises the girl. The man then calls for his Black servant, Baba Merzoug, and orders him to kill Aïcha and bring back her blood in a flask. Despite his orders, Baba Merzoug takes Aïcha to his master's two sisters in hopes one of them gives her shelter. The elder refuses to take her in, but the younger sister gives her lodge, kills a chicken and gives Baba Merzoug a flask of its blood. The Sultan of the Genies, now calmer, goes after his wife - who has given birth at this time - and his child, and finds him at his younger sister's palace. They reunite, and he decides to punish Aïcha's sisters by making them mute and casting them in poverty. Aïcha and the Sultan then celebrate their child's seven-day birth. Scholars Hasan El-Shamy and Emmanuel Plantade sourced the tale from Algeria.

==== Libya ====
Philologist Ester Panetta collected a Libyan tale in the Libyan Arabic language, titled Hādâk eš-šâyeb (Italian: Quel vecchio; English: "A certain old man"). In this tale, a poor old couple have seven daughters, are very poor and earn eager money. The Lord sends them a black man to solve their poor situation and announces he wishes to marry one of the couple's daughters. The black man sends them a large basket of food and a basket of money, and still they question the man's motives. The black man reports to his master and he sends a larger dowry to marry the couple's daughter. The couple sends one of his daughter with the black man and they reach a rich palace. At night, the black man becomes a handsome youth and lies in bed next to the girl. However, one night, the girl wakes up and discovers her mysterious bedmate with a keyhole ("serratura", in the Italian translation) on his chest with a key next to it. She opens the keyhole and finds an entire market inside it, with Arab people trading and selling. The girl closes the keyhole, but her husband wakes up and flies away, abandoning his human wife. She cries for her loss, but dons a cloak and begins to wander. After eight months, her clothes are torn down, and she sleeps under a wall next to a little house. The owner of the house is her sister-in-law, discovers the girl and shelters her. The girl, pregnant, tells everything to her sister-in-law, and is given a room. At night, the magical husband flies in to one of sister's houses and says he married, but his wife betrayed him, then flies away, while his wife goes to another sister-in-law's house where she takes shelter a second time. The magical husband appears at his other sister's house to complain that his human wife opened the keyhole in his body. The second sister-in-law goes to tend to the girl she took in and helps in the delivery of her son, since she is pregnant. The woman notices the baby has a keyhole with a key on his body and realizes the girl gave birth to her brother's son, then asks for explanations. The girl tells her sister-in-law everything and reunites with her husband. The magical husband meets his son, reconciles with his wife and they celebrate another wedding.

Philologist Ester Panetta collected a Libyan tale in the Libyan Arabic language, titled ’Alä hādâk es-sulṭân (Italian: Intorno a quel sultano; English: "About a certain sultan"). In this tale, a poor old couple have three daughters. One day, a black man appears to the poor family and wishes to marry the couple's youngest daughter, on behalf of his master. The black man brings them wedding gifts and brings the girl to his master's palace. At night, the girl notices there is someone in bed with her. As the nights pass, the girl takes a candle to bed and discovers a handsome youth next to her, with a lock on his chest. She opens the lock and discovers a world inside it. The youth wakes up, admonishes his wife and orders his servant to banish her. Out of pity for his master's wife, the black servant directs her to the houses of his master's sisters, since she is pregnant. The girl goes to his sisters-in-law's palaces, but is rejected in the first two. She finally takes shelter with the third sister-in-law, and gives birth to a son who has a lock on his chest, just like his father. The boy's aunt recognizes the birthmark as same as the boy's father's. The youth goes to visit his three sisters and finds his wife and son with the third one. They reconcile.

=== America ===
==== Chile ====
In a Chilean tale collected by Yolando Pino-Saavedra with the title El Pangano ("The Pangano"), two women live together and promise each other to marry their children. One woman gives birth to three daughters, but lives in poverty, while the other becomes rich, but has no children. One day, one of the poor woman's daughter goes to the rich woman, her godmother, and asks for better housing. The rich woman is happy to welcome her friend's family and directs them to a house in the mountains, where people mysteriously died. The poor family move in to the house. Eight days later, two of the sisters bake bread in the oven, while the third finds a coal and tries to enter the house, but someone blindfolds her and silences her with a hand. Despite the suddenness of the action, her assailant assures she has nothing to fear, and that if she comes with them quietly, her family shall be given riches. With no choice, the girl is taken to a coach and driven away to a large palace, furnished with jewels, dresses and extravagant furniture. The girl is served by a person named Pangano. That same night, she feels someone is in bed with her and calls for Pangano, who sees nothing and tells her to sleep. She spends her days at the palace, but begins to miss home, and asks Pangano to visit her family. The man agrees and prepares a selection of gifts for her family, but she has to keep quiet about her life at the palace, and she must return when she hears his whistle. Twice she visits her family, and twice she is bothered by her family's insistent questioning, to which she answers she will not come anymore if her family keeps pushing the subject. The third time, Pangano takes the girl to her sister's wedding, and takes the opportunity to sing a beautiful song on the guitar. While the man is distracted, the girl is given a firesource by her mother, to be used on her mysterious bedmate when she returns to the palace. It happens thus: the girl lights the source and sees that her bedmate is a handsome prince. The prince wakes up and, in a fury, commands Pangano, his servant, to go and come back with his wife's heart and eyes. Pangano takes his master's wife to the forest, but spares her, killing a dog in her place. She also orders a shepherd to guide the girl, who is pregnant, to a royal castle, where she is to be given lodge. The shepherd obeys the man's orders and leaves the princess with a queen and her daughters. The queen becomes fond of the girl and prepares her quarters, where she gives birth to a son with a golden navel. The queen pays her guest a visit and sees the child in the cradle, recognizing in the child the same golden navel as her own missing son had. Meanwhile, the prince and his servant Pangano enter the queen's castle and the prince asks where his wife is at the premises. Pangano answers and goes to the gardens to fetch her. The girl sees Pangano and pleads for her life, thinking he is there to kill her, but the man tells her he is to take her to her husband. The prince and the girl marry.

Chilean folklorist Ramón Laval collected a variant from a teller from Molinas, titled El Pescadito Encantado ("The Enchanted Little Fish"): a fisherman has no luck in catching fish, until one day a talking little fish appears to him and offers to provide him with nets full of fishes, in exchange for the first thing that comes out of the man's house. The fisherman agrees to its terms and catches a lot of fish, and returns home, only to be greeted by his youngest daughter. The man forgets about the fish's deal, until he hears a whistle coming from the ocean as a reminder. The man decides to honor his deal, and sends his daughter to the fish, who takes the girl to an underwater palace. In the marine palace, the girl lives in splendour and luxury, but is warned never to kindle any source of light in their bedchambers, although she feels someone coming to her bed at night. The palace is also guarded by a hound named Leofricome that can grant anything its mistress can wish for. One day, Leofricome takes the girl to her sister's wedding, where her mother gives her some candles and a matchbox, then she goes back home. At night, the girl lights up a match and sees her mysterious bedmate: a handsome youth. A drop of wax falls on his right hand and he wakes up, turns into a little fish and flees. Alone in the palace, the gives birth to a boy with a golden padlock on his stomach. Some time later, the girl wishes to go back to her parents' house, but Leofricome cannot leave the palace without its master's orders, but it produces a ball of yarn, throws it and tells the girl to follow it where it stops. The girl follows the yarn to the stables at her parents-in-law's palace, where she nurses her baby. The queen and the king find the girl at the stables and take her in, after they recognize the padlock on the baby as the same the prince Pescadito, their son, has. After the girl settles in the castle, the royal couple writes a letter to Pescadito about his wife, and he decides to pay her a visit in his parents' castle. After prince Pescadito goes to the palace, his wife thinks he is after her and their child, and flees to the woods. Pescadito goes after her in the woods, and his curse is broken. Pescadito reunites with his wife and son, and they marry.

== See also ==
- The Padlock (Italian fairy tale)
