= The Padlock (fairy tale) =

Italian literary fairy tale

The Padlock (Italian: Lo catenaccio) is a literary fairy tale written by the Italian poet Giambattista Basile in the Pentamerone, as the ninth story of the second day. It is considered to be one of two rewritings of the Graeco-Roman myth of "Cupid and Psyche" by Basile, the other being "Lo turzo d'oro".

In spite of its origins as a literary tale, it is related to the international cycle of Animal as Bridegroom or The Search for the Lost Husband, in that a human girl marries a supernatural or enchanted husband, loses him and must search for him. Similar stories have been collected from oral tradition across the Mediterranean, in Italy, Greece and Spain, and nearby countries.

== Summary ==
A woman lives in poverty with her three daughters. One day, she sends her daughters to fetch water for them, but her elders try to make the other go in their place. Luciella, the youngest, takes the jug and goes to fetch water herself. At the fountain, she meets a "handsome slave", who makes a proposition for her: if she comes to live with him in a nearby cave, the man will wash her in pretty things.

Luciella agrees to his offer, but goes back home to deliver the water to her mother. The girl then accompanies the slave to a nearby cave: inside, an underground palace, filled with gold. She sleeps in an ornate bed, and, after the candles are put out, someone joins her in bed. This continues on for some days.

One day, Luciella begins to miss home, and the slave agrees to let her pay a visit to her relatives, but bids her not to tell anything about her new life. The girl obeys at first: she visits her family, but remains steadfast to her mother and sisters' questions and goes back to the underground palace. She visits them time and time again, jealousy creeping even greater in their hearts. The fourth time, Luciella's mother and sisters tell her her mysterious bedmate must be a handsome man with a padlock on his body, and convince her to light a candle to check on this padlock.

Moved by her family's words, Luciella returns home and retires to the bedchambers that same night. She is given a sleeping draught, but tosses its contents away and pretends to fall asleep. While her bedmate is asleep, she lights a candle and confirms her family's story: her companion is a handsome youth, and there is a padlock on him. Luciella opens it and sees some women with skeins, one dropping one of the skeins. Luciella, kind that she was, shouts out for the woman to get the skein she dropped, but her voice wakes up the companion at her bedside. Feeling betrayed, the youth commands some female slaves to dress Luciella in rags and to throw her out of the palace and into the woods.

Heavily pregnant and abandoned by her husband, Luciella wanders to the city of Torre-Longa, where she takes shelter with the local queen and gives birth to a beautiful baby in the stables. That same night, a man comes at night and rocks the baby with a song, saying that, if the crows never crowed, he would stay by his son's side. However, as soon as morning comes, the rooster crows and the youth disappears. This goes on for some more days, until the queen's maid witnesses the event and reports to the queen the finding. The queen issues an edict for all roosters to be killed around the city, following the youth's instructions. The next time, the youth appears again, but, this time, the rooster does not crow. The queen embraces the youth, who she recognizes as her son, and breaks his curse. Luciella regains her husband, and the queen is happy she gained a grandson and her son back.

== Analysis ==
=== Tale type ===
Scholars have called attention to structural similarities between the tale and the Graeco-Roman myth of Cupid and Psyche, as related by Apuleius in the 2nd century AD. In fact, The Padlock is considered to be one of Basile's renditions of the myth, the other being Lo turzo d'oro ("The Golden Root", tale type ATU 425B, "The Son of the Witch"). On the other hand, scholars like Richard McGillivray Dawkins and Nancy Canepa suggest that Basile's tale originated from the Mediterranean, instead of being a literary work.

Philologist Gianfranco D'Aronco classified the tale as Italian type 425, Lo sposo scomparso ("The Lost Husband"). The Italian type corresponds, in the international Aarne-Thompson-Uther Index, to type ATU 425, "The Search for the Lost Husband". The second revision of the index, made in 1961 by scholar Stith Thompson, referred to the tale as "Pentamerone II, No. 9" and listed it under subtypes 425E and 425L. Renato Aprile, editor of the Italian Catalogue of Tales of Magic, sourced the tale from Campania and classified it as part of the "Amor e Psiche" cycle (type 425), as subtypes 425E(L).

==== ATU 425E ====
Nancy Canepa indexes it as subtype ATU 425E, "Enchanted Husband Sings Lullaby". In this type, the heroine's husband has a padlock on his body; after she betrays his trust, she is expelled and takes shelter in a castle where she gives birth to their child; at night her husband comes to lull the baby with a song in which there are instructions on how to save him.

According to Jan-Öjvind Swahn and Hans-Jörg Uther, Lo Catenaccio is the oldest example of type ATU 425E.

==== AaTh 425L ====
The tale could also be classified as type AaTh 425L, "The Padlock on the Enchanted Husband", or "The Husband with a Lock in his Navel", according to American folklorist D. L. Ashliman. In subtype AaTh 425L, the heroine discovers a padlock or keyhole on her husband's body; she opens it and sees strange sights within; her scream alerts the enchanted husband, who expels his (pregnant) wife. However, German folklorist Hans-Jörg Uther, in his 2004 revision of the international index, subsumed type AaTh 425L under new type ATU 425E.

=== Motifs ===
Scholar Jan-Öjvind Swahn, in his monograph about Cupid and Psyche, remarked that the heroine's pregnancy was an "essential" trait of subtype AaTh 425L.

==== The prince's lullaby ====
In his 1955 monograph, Swahn noted that the husband's lullaby to his child was "rather uniformly formed", containing instructions to extinguish "the cocks [galli] and the clocks [campane]". Similarly, according to Italian literary critic Mario Lavagetto and Anna Buia, the prince's lullaby from Basile's tale is "preserved" in most of the subsequent variants, with explicit references to silencing the clocks and the roosters. In the same vein, professor Michael Merakles argued that the prince's lullaby "dissolved" in Greek variants, but its existence can be gleamed by fragmentary references present in the texts.

==== The crowing of the rooster ====
Although they acknowledged that the crowing of the rooster marks type AaTh 425E, Mario Lavagetto and Anna Buia, as well as folklorist Letterio Di Francia, remarked that the motif is "widespread" in Italian tradition. In this regard, German folklorist Rudolf Schenda noted that the rooster's crowing in Basile's tale acquires a negative connotation, since it helps prolong the prince's enchantment, and only by having the roosters killed can he be saved in a more permanent manner. Similarly, according to Di Francia, there is a widespread belief across Italy that the rooster's crowing facilitates the action of supernatural beings, and spells can be broken only by ceasing their singing.

== Variants ==
Nancy Canepa locates similar stories in Turkey and Greece. Likewise, according to the Greek Folktale Catalogue, type 425E is "popular" in Turkey and Greece, while type 425L is known across the Greek Aegean Islands and in Asia Minor. On the other hand, Swahn restricted the former subtype to Italy and Catalonia. In the same vein, Renato Aprile described subtype 425E as "almost exclusively" of Central and Southern Italian provenance, barring some Catalan texts.

=== Italy ===
The "Istituto centrale per i beni sonori ed audiovisivi" ("Central Institute of Sound and Audiovisual Heritage") promoted research and registration throughout the Italian territory between the years 1968–1969 and 1972. In 1975 the Institute published a catalog edited by Alberto Maria Cirese and Liliana Serafini reported 4 variants of subtype 425E, under the banner Il marito incantato canta la ninna nanna ("The Enchanted Husband Sings Lullaby"). They also reported a single variant of subtype 425L, Il lucchetto sul marito incantato, which they also classified as the former.

==== King Animmulu ====
Scholar Jack Zipes translated a Sicilian tale collected by Giuseppe Pitrè. In this tale, titled in the original Sicilian Lu re d’Anìmmulu (Italian: Il Re dell'Arcolaio, German: König von Haspel; English: "King Animmulu"), a poor shoemaker lives with his three daughters Peppa, Nina and Nunzia. One day, Nunzia finds a large fennel plant in the forest and tries to pull it, without luck, so her father helps her. They pull it and see a doorway and a young man. The pair explain to the youth that they were just gathering some herbs for a soup, and the youth makes a proposition: he shall take Nunzia and make her father rich. The pair agree, and Nunzia goes with the youth to live in his lavish underground palace. Some time later, Peppa convinces her father to let her pay a visit to Nunzia. Their father takes her there, and Peppa enters the underground palace. Nunzia welcomes her and asks her to comb her hair. While doing it, she finds a key in her hair, which she takes while Nunzia is asleep. Peppa uses the key to open a secret room; inside, pretty young women doing embroidery for Nunzia's unborn child, but, as soon as they see Peppa, their faces turn old and ugly. Peppa closes the door and wakes her sister up, asking her to be guided out of the palace. She explains she opened the forbidden door, and Nunzia says she is now lost. Peppa departs. The pretty young women, who are fairies, order Nunzia's husband to banish her. With no other option, the youth banishes a pregnant Nunzia, but gives her a silver yarn, for her to throw it and follow it. Nunzia complies with his decision, but follows his advice and reaches King Animmulu's mother's castle, where she is given shelter. Nunzia gives birth to a son, whom a maidservant recognizes as the spitting image of the queen's son. She goes to inform the queen. Meanwhile, back to the underground palace, the fairies inform King Animmulu that Nunzia gave birth to his son, and suggest they pay them a visit. King Animmulu enters Nunzia's chambers and sings a lullaby to their baby, while the fairies dance outside and sing about how the dawn has not come yet. King Animmulu disappears with the fairies in the morning. The next night, King Animmulu comes again and Nunzia asks him how they can defeat the fairies; he answers: they must stop the crows from singing, muffle the bells and clocks, and erect a dark canvas around the castle painted like the night sky to trick the fairies so they think it is not yet dawn. Nunzia and the queen follow his instructions and prepare the canvas for the following night: the fairies dance, thinking it is still night, until the queen's servants draw out the canvas when the sun is in mid-heaven; the fairies then change into snakes and lizards. King Animmulu is free at last and lives with Nunzia, his son and his mother. Italian author Italo Calvino reworked the tale and adapted it as Il figlio del Re nel pollaio ("The King's Son in the Henhouse"), where the enchanted prince is called Re Cristallu ("King Crystal"). Calvino also sourced the tale from Salaparuta. Scholars Rudolf Schenda and Doris Senn classified the tale as types 425, "The Search for the Lost Husband", type 425A, "Tierbrautigam (Amor und Psyche)", and "especially" type 425E, "Verzauberter Ehemann singt Wiegenlied" ("Enchanted Husband Sings Lullaby").

==== The Golden Cabbage ====
Italian anthropologist Antonio De Nino collected a tale from Abruzzo with the title Il Cavolo d'Oro ("The Golden Cabbage"). In this tale, a poor mother has three daughters, and they all scavenge for food by gathering herbs. One day, the youngest daughter finds a golden cabbage in the fields and plucks its foliage to bring it home. By selling the gilded foliage, the family becomes rich. They decide to have the entire vegetable to themselves, and the third daughter goes to uproot it. She does and opens up a hole on the ground which she enters. She finds a fairy palace whose mistress appears and orders the girl on tasks: first, to separate a mixed heap of beans and fava beans; next, to separate a mixed heap of corn and wheat. With the help of a chained prince's son, the girl fulfills both tasks. Some time later, the girl asks the fairies to visit her family, and the fairies allow it. She goes back home and talks to her family about sleeping with a mysterious person at night she has never seen, because she is given a sleeping drink. Her sisters advise her to toss away the drink and hide a lit candle nearby. The girl goes back home and follows her sisters' instructions: with the candle, she finds a youth beside her on the bed, with two mirrors on his knees. Reflected in the mirrors are women preparing clothes for the prince's wife, and one of them washes some in a river. The girl shouts for the washerwoman to mind her clothes, and her screams wake up the prince, who laments that she betrayed his trust, for the fairies will banish her. The prince gives a ball of yarn to help his wife, who is expelled by the fairies to the wide world. Fortunately, she throws the yarn and follows it to a castle where she is given lodge for the night. She gives birth to a boy in the stables, and stays there. One night, the prince visits them in secret and sings a song to his son, about how he would be with him if the rooster did not crow and midnight did not ring, then disappears. The queen is informed of the prince's night visits to the girl, and hatches a plan to release her son: she has soldiers at the ready for the youth's next visit; he appears with chains around his body and, when the fairies try to pull him back, the soldiers cut off the chains, releasing him from the fairies' grasp.

==== Monte Rochettino ====
British author Isabella Mary Anderton collected a tale she sourced from Tuscany. In this tale, titled Monte Rochettino, a widow has three daughters. During a period of famine, they forage for grass to eat. One day, the elder sister finds a golden cabbage and tries to take it out with a zappa (a pickaxe), but can only remove a leave which she sells. The same thing happens to the second sister. The third sister manages to remove the whole cabbage; a dwarf person appears to her and takes her to an underground palace. He gives her a set of keys and says his master will come out at night, and she must not see him; if she needs anything, she has to call "Monte Rochettino". The girl spends time in the underground palace and her lover comes to her at night. In time, she begins to miss her family and asks Monte Rochettino to be allowed a visit. Monte Rochettino allows for a three days' visit. The girl tells her family everything, and her mother gives her a candle and three matches. The girl returns to the palace, and lights up a candle when her mysterious lover is asleep: she finds a locked box around his neck, opens with the key that was in the lock, and enters the box. Inside the box, the girl finds rooms where woman are weaving clothes for the unborn king's son. The girl leaves the box and goes to look with a candle at her husband, but a drop of candlewax falls on his body. The man wakes up, says she betrayed him, and banishes her aboveground. The girl meets some washerwomen who give her some clothes and direct her to a shepherd. The story explains the washerwomen and the shepherd were sent by her husband. The shepherd gives her shelter and a chestnut, and points her to another shepherd. The girl goes to a second shepherd, who gives her a nut, and a third shepherd, who gives her a walnut and directs her to a castle, whose queen has lost her son. The girl goes to the queen's castle and is taken in for forty days. The queen tries to make her leave, but the girl cracks open the nuts to produce extravagant gifts (a golden dog from the chestnut, two golden capons from the nut, and a golden wool-winder from the walnut) she uses to pay the queen to let her stay. In time, the girl gives birth to a daughter. At night, a white dove perches on the window and begins to sing a lullaby, saying that if the cock never sang and the bells never rang, he would be with his daughter. The servant alerts the queen about the dove's singing, and the monarch decides to see it for herself. The next night, the dove returns and sings the same lullaby. The queen soon kills the cocks and ties up all the bells in preparation for the dove's arrival the following night. On the third day, the dove flies in again and approaches the baby daughter. The baby touches the dove and it returns to human form: it is the queen's son and the girl's husband.

==== Il Re Sonno ====
Rachel Harriette Busk collected a Roman variant titled Il Re Sonno ("King Sonno"). In this tale, three orphan sisters need to find work and decide to sew and knit all night. The elder sews while the other two sleep, and they alternate. When it is the cadette's turn, she feels sleep slowly seeping in, and invokes the name of "Re Sonno" to stay awake. Suddenly, a young king appears before her, Re Sonno himself. The girl explains she is but a poor maiden trying to earn her living, and grows fond of him. On the same night, she asks Re Sonno how they can be together, and Re Sonno says that is impossible, for the roosters crow and the bells ring in the Avemaria and the morning, and he vanishes. She summons him on the third night, and both sleep together. Nine months later, the maiden gives birth to a son. One day, a queen passes by the sisters' house and notices the baby's resemblance to her own son, who has been a victim of sorcery and disappeared. The queen asks for explanations and the maiden says she summons a prince called Re Sonno to help her stay awake. The queen orders her to summon the man, but the maiden says that he can only appear if the roosters do not crow and the bells do not ring in the morning. Thus, the queen takes the maiden and the maiden's son to the castle, and orders the bells not to ring and for all roosters to be locked up. With this, the maiden summons Re Sonno again, and he appears to her: the queen goes to embrace her son and breaks the enchantment.

==== The Red Fish ====
In a Griko tale collected by Domenico Palumbo from an informant in Calimera with the title O kunto mon afsari rodinò, and translated as Il pesce rosso ("The Red Fish"), a fisherman has three daughters. Near Christmas, the man worries about them not having food to eat, and announces he will try his luck at catching some fish. He sails to the sea and casts his net three times, failing to catch anything the first two times but a golden fish in the third. The fish begins to talk and asks the man if he has any daughters, pays him a hundred ducats for one of them and promises to reward him with two hundred more if the girl comes. The fisherman returns home with the empty fishing nets, to the girls' surprise, and he shows them the money he obtained with the fish, explaining the situation to them. The elder two refuse to go with the fish, save for the cadette. The following morning, the man takes his youngest daughter to the seashore, summons the fish and delivers her to the animal, gaining the full sum of money. The fish takes the girl with him to an underwater palace, spacious and splendid, with many rooms. She lives with the fish in comfort and luxury. Time passes, and one of the fisherman's other daughters asks him to let her visit Maria (the cadette). The man summons the goldfish again, says his other daughter wishes to visit Maria and the fish takes his sister-in-law to the underwater palace. Maria meets her elder sister and says she is happy, but is asked if her husband is fish or human. Maria does not know, and has anything she desires, so her sister suggests her sisters takes a candlestick and spy on him at night. Maria's sister leaves, and the girl ponders on her questions. She goes to sleep at night, and takes a candlestick to see her bedmate: she finds a handsome youth next to her. She admires him three times; on the third time, a bell rings, waking the youth up. He wakes up, admonishes Maria, saying that she extended his curse, which would have ended after three months, three days and three moments, and now they have to part. He takes his wife, who is pregnant, to the beach, and advises her to go to his house, where his family is mourning for his loss and where she can take shelter, but she must feign ignorance about his whereabouts and not tell anything to his mother.

Maria follows the fish's advice, walks into a town and asks for shelter at his mother's house, begging for charity and on her son's name. The servant reports to his lady about it, and the lady goes to meet Maria. She will let Maria sleep in the upstairs rooms if she knows anything about her son, but Maria feigns ignorance and says she only knows he is missing. The lady takes her in and places her in a room on the first floor, accompanied by a maidservant. In time Maria gives birth to a boy that looks like exactly like the lady's missing son. The maidservant notices the familial resemblance and informs the lady about it, who confronts Maria again about her son's whereabouts. Maria still denies having any news. That night, while Maria sleeps, a person enters the room and goes to rock the baby in his cradle, singing that if his grandmother knew, the baby would be wrapped in golden bib, and if the bird did not sing, the dawn did not rise, and the bell was silent, then leaves. The maidservant witnesses the exchange and reports to her lady the following morning, saying that she saw "Re Rendicolo" (the missing son). The lady then says she will sleep in the same room as Maria for the next night. As night falls, Maria goes to sleep, but the lady lies awake waiting for her son. At the same hour, seven o'clock, her son comes in and rocks his son in the cradle with the same song. After he finishes the song, he returns his son to the cradle and begins to leave, when his mother grabs him and forbids him from leaving. The youth says that he would have returned every night until his mother found him out, but now the curse is ended. He then introduces his wife, Maria, and their son to his mother, and the tale ends.

==== The Story of a Father who has Three Daughters ====
In a tale from Romagna, collected by ethnologue Giuseppe Bellosi from teller Pietro Camminata with the Romagnol title La fóla d’un pédre ch’l’éva tre fjóli and translated to Italian as La favola di un padre che aveva tre figlie ("The Story of a Father who has Three Daughters"), a father has three daughters, but the family lives in misery and poverty. The man carries a bag and tries to forage for anything for them. One time, he sees a large cabbage in an orchard and tries to pluck it with some difficulty, then sighs in dejection: "Ohimè". Suddenly, a large snake ("biscione") appears out of nowhere and says his name is Ohimè; he allows the man to take the vegetable home, but demands one of the man's daughters in return (the tale explains he is a king's son enchanted by the fairies). The man returns home with the cabbage and shows it to his daughters, but looks dejected. The girls ask him what is the matter, and he explains the situation. The eldest offers to go to the orchard and fulfill the snake's demand. The man advises her to call for Ohimè. The elder girl goes and summons the snake, but, on seeing the animal, runs back home in fear. The same thing happens to the middle girl. Lastly, the cadette decides to face the snake herself and summons him. The snake appears to the girl, who is trembling, but remains corageous. The snake congratulates the girl and takes her to his den underground, which is a large palace. The snake delivers a set of keys to the girl, saying she can enter every room, save for one small room where the fairies are, lest she banishes her. The girl lives with the snake for a few years. One day, being curious, she decides to open the forbidden room, and discovers a group of women sewing caps for children. The women sight the girl and lament that the girl entered the forbidden room, for now the girl will be expelled from the palace. The snake returns home, learns that the girl, called Caterine, broke his prohibition, laments the fact and reluctantly decides to expel her. However, being pregnant, the snake gives the girl a ball of thread for her to throw and follow, and when the thread stops, she is to shout "Ohimè". Caterine follows his instructions and, when the yarn stops, she calls for Ohimè. Suddenly, a castle door open and out comes a king, saying that Ohimè was his son's name, and asks Caterine how she can know him. Caterina explains she met the snake, lived with him and was expelled after breaking his trust by opening the forbidden door. The king welcomes Caterine and gives her shelter in his house. Time passes, and the girl gives birth to Ohimè's son. One night, a voice echoes in the air, bids Ohimè's son to rest, and mentions that if the roosters do not sing and the hours do not ring, how long he will remain. Caterina overhears the song and tells the king about it, so the monarch spreads posters around the city forbidding people to ring the bells. The following night, the same voice sings the same song, and Caterine informs the king of the second visit of the mysterious voice. After the second night, the king issues an order for people to kill the roosters around the city. On the third night, the voice comes in again, sings the same verses, but this time, since the roosters do not sing and the bells do not ring, when morning finally dawns, there is a handsome prince in the castle, fully returned. They organize a grand feast in celebration. The tale was also classified as type ATU 425E, "The Enchanted Husband Sings Lullaby" (Lo marito stregato canta la ninna nanna).

==== King Golden Fountain ====
A folk tale from Apulia was collected in Bisceglie by the folklorist Saverio La Sorsa from informant Lopopolo Michele, titled Ré Fendana d’áure and translated into Italian as Re Fontana d’oro ("King Golden Fountain"). It tells the story of three poor orphan sisters, Isabella, Marianna, and Giulia, who live together and sew for a living. One day, they go fishing, and Giulia pulls up something very heavy. Her sisters help her and they catch a handsome youth who asks the trio who caught him. They tell him it was Giulia, and the youth declares her to be his wife. They live in a villa in the mountains. Giulia tells him her name is Nennella and the youth introduces himself as Ninnillo. The sisters pay her a visit and gain a purse of gold coins. The girls pester their sister with questions regarding their brother-in-law and suggests she asks him his name. The youth learns of this request and says he cannot reveal his name, lest he vanishes. Still, she asks him, and he mentions his name: "King Golden Fountain". Suddenly, the youth then vanishes, and Giulia is left alone between two fountains. She wanders off through forests and vineyeards and reaches a city where she takes shelter with a woman. The woman, noticing Giulia is pregnant and ready to give birth, advises her to go to the local queen's castle, since the monarch has lost her son and is doing favours in hopes of finding God's grace and being reunited with her son. Giulia goes to the queen's castle and the queen gives her shelter, but places her in a gatehouse. Giulia then gives birth to a son just like his father. At midnight, she hears the rustling of chains and a song, saying that if his mother knew, the baby would be dressed in gold clothes, cradled in a golden cradle, and washed in a golden basin, then wishes that he could stay as long as the rooster would not crow and the dawn would not break. As soon as the roosters crow, he vanishes. One night, the queen's aunt overhears the youth's lament and tells the queen. The monarch goes to see it for herself and recognizes the youth's voice as her son's, then runs into the room to confront her son. The prince's spirit says that blacksmiths have to be gathered to break each of the chains. The queen summons all the blacksmiths to the castle and they work to break down the chains the next time the prince appears. When dawn breaks with the rooster's crow, the prince is restored to normal. He introduces Giulia as his beloved and they move out to the castle.

==== Other tales ====
Author Angelo de Gubernatis reported an unpublished Italian tale collected by one S. M. Greco from Cosenza, Calabria. In this tale, a girl pulls up a rampion and finds a staircase leading to an underground palace, where some fairies live. The fairies take her in, and at night the girl hears a noise every night. She later visits her family and goes back to the palace, where she lights a candle to better see who comes at night to her bed (following her mother's advice). She sees a handsome youth with a looking glass on his breast, and accidentally drops some candlewax on his body. He wakes up and banishes the girl, but the fairies help her and give her a ball of yarn for her to throw and follow. The girl uses the yarn and reaches a castle in a city who is mourning for the loss of their prince. The local queen takes in the girl and she gives birth to a boy. Some time later, a shoemaker appears and begins to sing at night how the girl's son is also his. The girl tells the queen the shoemaker is the lost prince, and they can save him by tricking him into thinking it is still night before he disappears. Thus, the queen kills every rooster in the city and covers the windows with veils painted black with diamonds. Tricked into staying long after the sunrise, the prince is saved and marries the girl.

=== Croatia ===
Croatian folklorist Maja Bošković-Stulli published a tale from Valtazar Bogišić's collection, sourced from a person named Ivo Miljan in Cavtat in the 19th century, with the title Kad bi znala majka kraljica... ("If only the queen mother knew"). In the tale, a couple have three daughters and dote on the youngest, while the elder two hate her the most and want to get rid of her. One day, the sisters are sent to gather firewood, but they want to take their cadette along. The mother forbids her to go, but the elder two take the girl to the forest and abandon her by the water's edge. The girl cries for her situation, when she sees a light approaching her: it is a young man carrying a small lantern and a walking stick. He asks the girl what is the matter, and offers to help her if she holds the stick. Despite some reluctance, the girl grabs hold of the stick and is carried across the water to a castle. She is attended by an invisible servant, and her bridegroom comes at night to their bed. The girl ages a bit and is pregnant. One day, she asks her lover if she could see her mother. He rejects her request at first, but takes her back home. The girl pays a visit to her mother and tells her what transpired with her since then. The woman advises her to open the padlock on him while he is asleep. She returns home with her lover and they go to bed. She uses a light and sees a lock on his body, which she opens: inside, she finds a large hall women preparing something for her unborn child, when one of the women drops a yarn and the girl comments on it. Suddenly, the castle disappears, and the heroine finds herself alone. She weeps, until she sees a light in the distance and follows it, eventually reaching a grand estate. She knocks on the door and asks for shelter. The queen opens the door to her and places her in a room. The girl gives birth to her son, a child with a golden star on the forehead. At night, someone comes to rock the baby with a song, saying that if only the mother queen knew, the roosters do not sing, the dawn does not break, and the bells do not sound, the little prince can return home and people will know the identity of the mysterious singer. The castle's occupants overhear the verses and question who could have been. The following night, the same mysterious person appears again and sings the same verses. The king hears news of the strange visitor and orders the roosters to be killed to avoid announcing the dawn, to close all shutters to hold out the light, and the bells not to ring anywhere. On the third night, the stranger - who is the king's son - enters the room again. By morning, the monarchs find the prince restored to them: he explains he is their son, stolen by the fairies ("vile") when he was a child in his cradle. The royal couple celebrate their son has returned, and marry him to the girl. Bošković-Stulli noted that the tale "resembled" Basile's story, and classified it as type 425E.

=== Slovenia ===
In a tale collected from Resia from a Slovenian source called Edda Di Lenardo Krukiž by ethnographer Milko Matičetov with the title Ta od ribe, and translated to Italian as Quella del pesce ("The One About the Fish"), a poor man has three daughters, and goes to fish in the sea. He tries to catch any fish and has no luck the first time, but casts his net again and catches a large fish. He brings the fish home and asks his daughters to sell it: the elder two carry the fish to sell, but the fish begins to talk and offers to shower them with gold and silver if it is released back into the sea. The two girls are frightened by the event. As for the youngest, Anna, she decides to release the fish, and it indeed provides the family with gold and silver. Later, the fish returns and asks the man to buy him a gold basin and to be brought home with them. It happens thus. Later, the fish asks the man to marry him to one of his daughters: the elder two refuse, saying they would jump off a roof or out of the window, save for Anna, the youngest, who agrees to marry the fish, despite her father's suspicions he might be bewitched. Anna and the fish marry. At the stroke of midnight, the fish turns into a handsome man who explains he is cursed not to see the light of the sun, and turns back into a fish as the sunrise approaches. They spend months like this. One day, one of Anna's aunts asks her how she can be married to a fish, and Anna says he is not a fish, but a handsome man who cannot see any light. Anna's aunt tells her to bring a candle to her room to better see him at night. Anna does as instructed and sees the human youth. He wakes up, laments that Anna betrayed him, and vanishes. Anna cannot find him in the basin, and suspects he has returned to the sea. She tells her family she is pregnant, then decides to search for him. As for the fish, he has returned to the sea, and is almost devoured by the other sea animals. Anna reaches a castle during her journey and asks to be sheltered by its mistress, a queen. In time, Anna's son is born, and his father, the human fish, comes to rock him with a song, asking for the bells not to ring, the light not to illuminate, and the cocks not to crow, then vanishes with the dawn. This goes on for some time, until the queen's governess, who was designed to look after the baby, reports to the queen. The queen and the governess spy on the man coming and cradling the child and listen to his song, until he disappears. The next day, the queen orders the bells to be muffled, no light to be lit, and the roosters to be killed, and wait for his visit. The man comes, rocks the baby, and goes to sleep. After three days' rest, the man wakes up and reveals to the queen he is her son, and Anna and the baby are his wife and child. Anna then returns to her family's house and introduces the human fish as her husband, a prince. Anna's elder sisters, then, make true on their vows: the elder jumps off the roof and the other throws herself out of the window. The Slovenian Folktale Catalogue, devised by scholar Monika Kropej, classifies the tale as type ATU 425E.

=== Albania ===
In an Italian-Albanian tale collected by linguist Martin Camaj from a source in Greci with the title I-bíri réjit ç-u-bë falkún and translated to Italian as Il figlio del re che diventa falco ("The King's Son who Became a Falcon") or Il figlio del re, falco ("The Son of the King, Falcon"), and to German as Der Sohn des Königs, der ein Falke war ("The King's Son who was a Falcon"), a girl works as a spinner, while her sisters and mother toil in the fields. One day, she wants to get some fresh air and join her family in plucking cabbages, but her mother objects. The next day, the whole family goes to pluck cabbages, the girl ventures into the forest and finds a large cabbage stalk. She pulls it and is dragged underground to a dark chamber. The Virgin Mary is down there, to Whom she asks where she can find an exit. The Virgin Mary tells the girl she will meet a prince who is human ("Christian man") by night and falcon by day. The Virgin Mary says she will turn the girl into a broom during the night; during the day, she will do the chores, then turn into a broom at night. It happens thus, and the falcon prince suspects there is someone in the house with him, and decides to investigate. After a few days, he spies on the girl turning from a broom to human form and discovers her. The girl explains her presence there, and the prince surmises Jesus and the Virgin Mary sent the girl there to break his curse, which will only be undone when only a single cock crows, three eggs crack, and a single bell rings. The prince marries the girl and she becomes pregnant. One day, a bearded old man appears underground and advises the girl to leave for the upper world, then gives her three golden eggs. The girl follows the old man's instructions and leaves for the surface. On the road, the eggs crack open and out come three golden birds. The girl reaches a king's palace and offers the three golden birds. A king's servant wants to buy the golden birds and the girl sells them for the right to spend the night and have her baby in safety. The king welcomes her and places her in the chicken coop, mentioning how they are doing this in a way to compensate for their missing son, who was cursed by a witch. Soon enough, the girl gives birth to a baby son, whom the queen says looks remarkably like the lost prince. The girl reveals that she is indeed the prince's wife, but he is living underground and assumes falcon form. She then tells the queen the conditions to release the prince from his enchantment: three eggs must be cracked, all bells must be muffled, so that only a single bell rings on Easter, and only a single cock crows. The queen does as her daughter-in-law instructed, and kills all but one rooster. This grants the prince human form for a day. He seizes the opportunity to visit his wife and says he misses her. Soon, the girl tells the queen and the king need to tie every church bell, leaving only one to ring on Easter in order to break the curse for good. The monarchs do as they were told; the prince is released from the curse, and returns to his parents' castle to live with his wife and son.

=== Greece ===
According to Emmanouela Katrinaki, Greek variants of type ATU 425E, Enchanted Husband Sings Lullaby, "almost always" appear in combination with type 425D. In the same vein, scholars Anna Angelopoulou and Aigle Broskou, editors of the Greek Folktale Catalogue, stated that subtype 425E is found in Greece "frequently combined" either with subtype 425A or subtype 425D. (Note: Greek type 425A corresponds to type ATU 425B, "Son of the Witch", of the international index.)

=== Americas ===
Brazilian author Marco Haurélio collected and published a Portuguese language tale from Bahia with the title Angélica Mais Afortunada (O Príncipe Teiú). In this tale, a man has three daughters. One day, he goes to hunt in the woods, but cannot catch anything, so he sits down to curse his bad luck. Suddenly, a teiú (a type of lizard) comes to him and asks what is wrong. The hunter explains his situation, and the teiú offers to provide the man with game, but demands a payment, to which the man agrees to give in exchange the first thing that greets him when he goes back home. Thinking he made a great deal, he returns home and is greeted by his youngest daughter Angélica. Her father tries to trick the lizard by sending his little she-dog, but the teiú senses the trick, and demands Angélica be given to him. The girl agrees to go with the lizard, and her father accompanies her to meet the teiú. She enters a hole in the ground that connects to a badly illuminated house, where she lives with a voice that comes at night to her bed. Some time later, she begins to miss her family, and the voice allows her to visit her father and sisters. Angélica goes home and tells her father about the mysterious bedmate, and her father gives her a match and a candle she can use to see him at night. Angélica returns to her house and lights a candle on her companion: instead of a teiú, she finds a handsome youth. She stares at his face for a long time she does not see that a drop of candlewax falls on his body. The youth wakes up and admonishes his wife that his curse was nearly lifted, but now she will have to search for him in his kingdom. Angélica leaves the house and wanders off until she finds an old woman's hut where she can give birth to her child. The old woman, suspecting she is the teiú's wife, goes to the castle to inform the king, who orders the old woman to wait on Angélica until she gives birth. It happens as ordered. That same night, the teiú creeps into the room to see his wife and newborn son, and sings a song to the boy about he, the father, would be with him, had the rooster not crowed, the donkey not whinnied, and the bell not rung, and disappears. The old woman sleeps through the whole scene. The event happens again in the following night. On the third night, the teiú takes his son in his arms, and sings him a song about how the rooster had crowed, the donkey had whinnied and the bell had rung, and he stayed with his son with the dawn. The teiú's curse is lifted, and he goes to live with his wife and son in his father's castle.

== Adaptations ==
The Grimm Brothers, compilers of their collection of fairy tales, adapted the tale The Padlock, from Basile, into Das Zauberkästchen, or The Little Magic Box. In this tale, a poor woman wants to cook for her family and sends her elder daughters to fetch some water. The elder two refuse, while the youngest offers to go herself. When she arrives at the fountain, she meets a manservant that bids her accompany him. The girl agrees, but she insists she has to deliver the water jug to her mother. After doing so, she accompanies the manservant and both enter a cave that leads to a magnificent underground palace. The girl is given a soporific drink and goes to bed at night with all lights down, and someone soon joins her. This goes on for some time, when she begins to miss her family, and her mysterious companion allows her return with gifts for her family, with the caveat not to reveal anything. After some more visits, the girl's sister learns from a sorceress the whole truth, and, when their cadette pays them another visit, they reveal the nature of her mysterious bedmate: a handsome man, whom she can better see if she brings a light to her candle. Following her sisters' advice, the girl tosses the drink and lights a candle: she confirms her husband is a handsome man and finds a little box next to her husband's body. She opens the box and small fairies come out of it, with sewing instruments. The girl notices one of the fairy's instruments is falling and shouts to alert her. The man wakes up, admonishes his wife for her betrayal and orders his servant to banish her from the palace. The girl is abandoned in the world, and is even rejected by her own family. With nowhere else to go, she wanders off until she reaches a queen's castle, where she rests in the stables and gives birth to her son. Some time later, a man, the boy's father, appears in the room and sings a song to rock the baby, saying that his child would be in a golden cradle if the rooster never crowed. With the rooster's crowing at sunrise, he vanishes. One of the queen's maids, who witnessed the event, informs the queen, who orders the roosters to be killed across the city. The next night, the man appears again. The queen, his mother, comes in the room and embraces him, breaking his curse.

== See also ==
- Filek-Zelebi
- The Story of Oimè
