= Lucy Garnett =

British folklorist (1849–1934)

Lucy Mary Jane Garnett (1849–1934) was a British folklorist, ethnographer, and traveller. She is best known for her work in what is now Turkey, Northern Greece and Albania, at least some of it conducted when that area was still part of the Ottoman Empire. She also translated Greek folk songs, published in 1888. She is listed in A Biographical Dictionary of Modern Rationalists.

== Publications ==
- Greek folk-songs from the Ottoman provinces of northern Hellas (1888, with John Stuart Stuart-Glennie)
- Greek Folk-Songs from the Turkish Provinces of Greece (1890)
- The Women of Turkey and their Folk-Lore (1890, with John Stuart Stuart-Glennie)
- Turkish life in town and country (1904)
- The Turkish people, their social life, religious beliefs and institutions, and domestic life (1909)
- Turkey of the Ottomans (1911)
- Mysticism and Magic in Turkey (1912)
- Greece of the Hellenes (1914)
- Ottoman Wonder Tales (1915)
- Balkan Home Life (1917)

== See also ==
=== Commentary on the Ottoman Empire ===
- Bey
- Effendi
- Pasha
- Robert College
- Demographics of the Ottoman Empire
- Education in the Ottoman Empire
- Languages of the Ottoman Empire

=== Collected stories ===
Note: For clarification, the author collected tales similar to the following stories:

- E Bukura e Dheut (character)
- Filek-Zelebi
- Fortunatus (book)
- Maroula
- The Death of Koschei the Deathless
- The Golden-Headed Fish
- The Sleeping Prince (fairy tale)
- The Story of Zoulvisia
- The Three Enchanted Princes
