= Fairy tale =

Fictional story typically featuring folkloric fantasy characters and magic

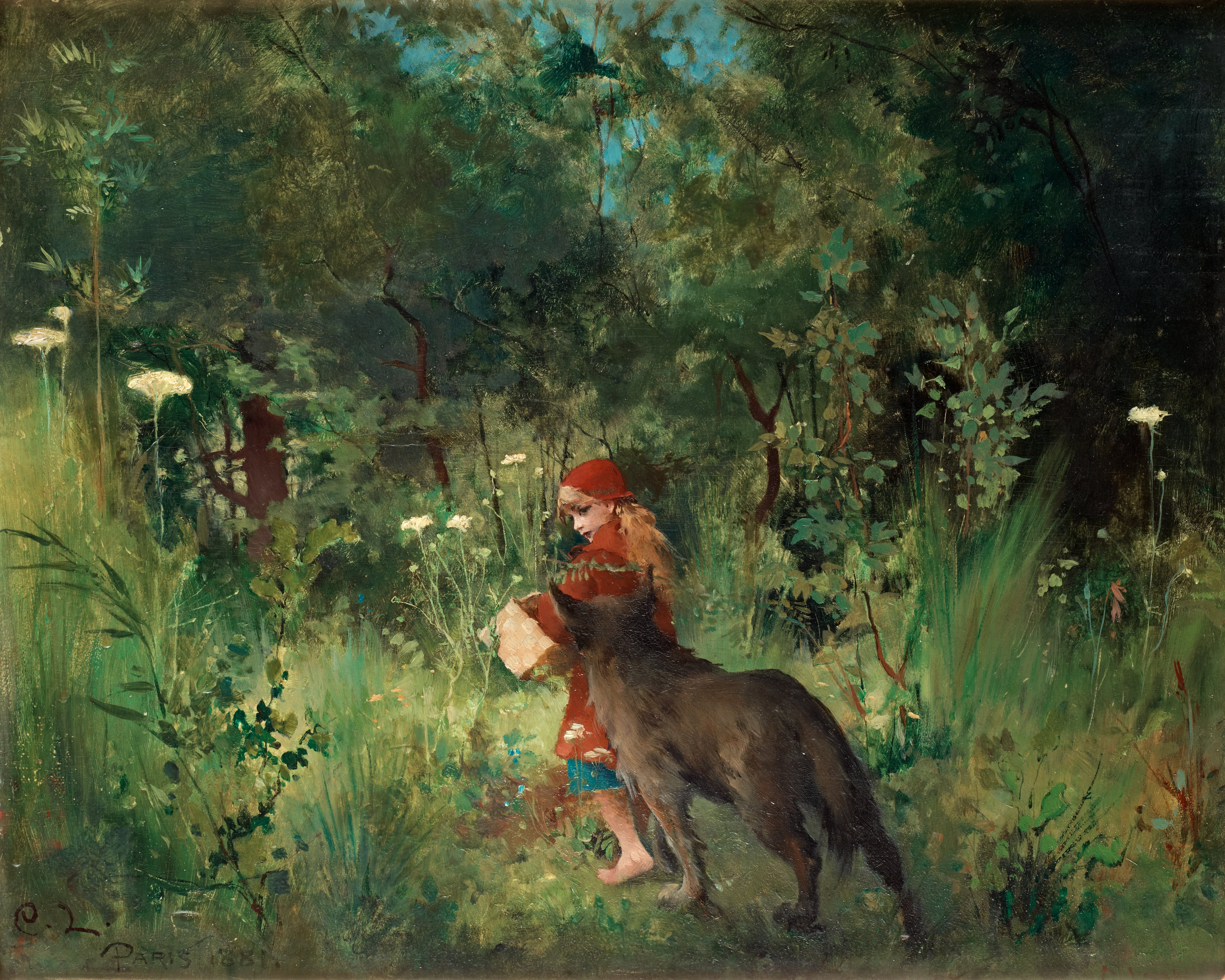
The European fairy tale Little Red Riding Hood and the Wolf in a painting by Carl Larsson in 1881

A fairy tale (alternative names include fairytale, fairy story, household tale, magic tale, or wonder tale) is a short story that belongs to the folklore genre. Such stories typically feature magic, enchantments, and mythical or fanciful beings. In most cultures, there is no clear line separating myth from folk or fairy tale; all these together form the literature of preliterate societies. Fairy tales may be distinguished from other folk narratives such as legends (which generally involve belief in the veracity of the events described) and explicit moral tales, including beast fables. Prevalent elements include dragons, dwarfs, elves, fairies, giants, gnomes, goblins, griffins, merfolk, monsters, monarchy, pixies, talking animals, trolls, unicorns, witches, wizards, woodwoses, magic, and enchantments.

In less technical contexts, the term is also used to describe something blessed with unusual happiness, as in "fairy-tale ending" (a happy ending) or "fairy-tale romance". Colloquially, the term "fairy tale" or "fairy story" can also mean any far-fetched story or tall tale; it is used especially to describe any story that is not only untrue, but also could not possibly be true. Legends are perceived as real within their culture; fairy tales may merge into legends, where the narrative is perceived both by teller and hearers as being grounded in historical truth. However, unlike legends and epics, fairy tales usually do not contain more than superficial references to religion and to actual places, people, and events; they take place "once upon a time" rather than in actual times.

Fairy tales occur both in oral and in literary form (literary fairy tale); the name "fairy tale" ("conte de fées" in French) was first ascribed to them by Madame d'Aulnoy in the late 17th century. Many of today's fairy tales have evolved from centuries-old stories that have appeared, with variations, in multiple cultures around the world.

The history of the fairy tale is particularly difficult to trace because often only the literary forms survive. Still, according to researchers at universities in Durham and Lisbon, such stories may date back thousands of years, some to the Bronze Age. Fairy tales, and works derived from fairy tales, are still written today.

Folklorists have classified fairy tales in various ways. The Aarne–Thompson–Uther Index and the morphological analysis of Vladimir Propp are among the most notable. Other folklorists have interpreted the tales' significance, but no school has been definitively established for the meaning of the tales.

== Terminology ==
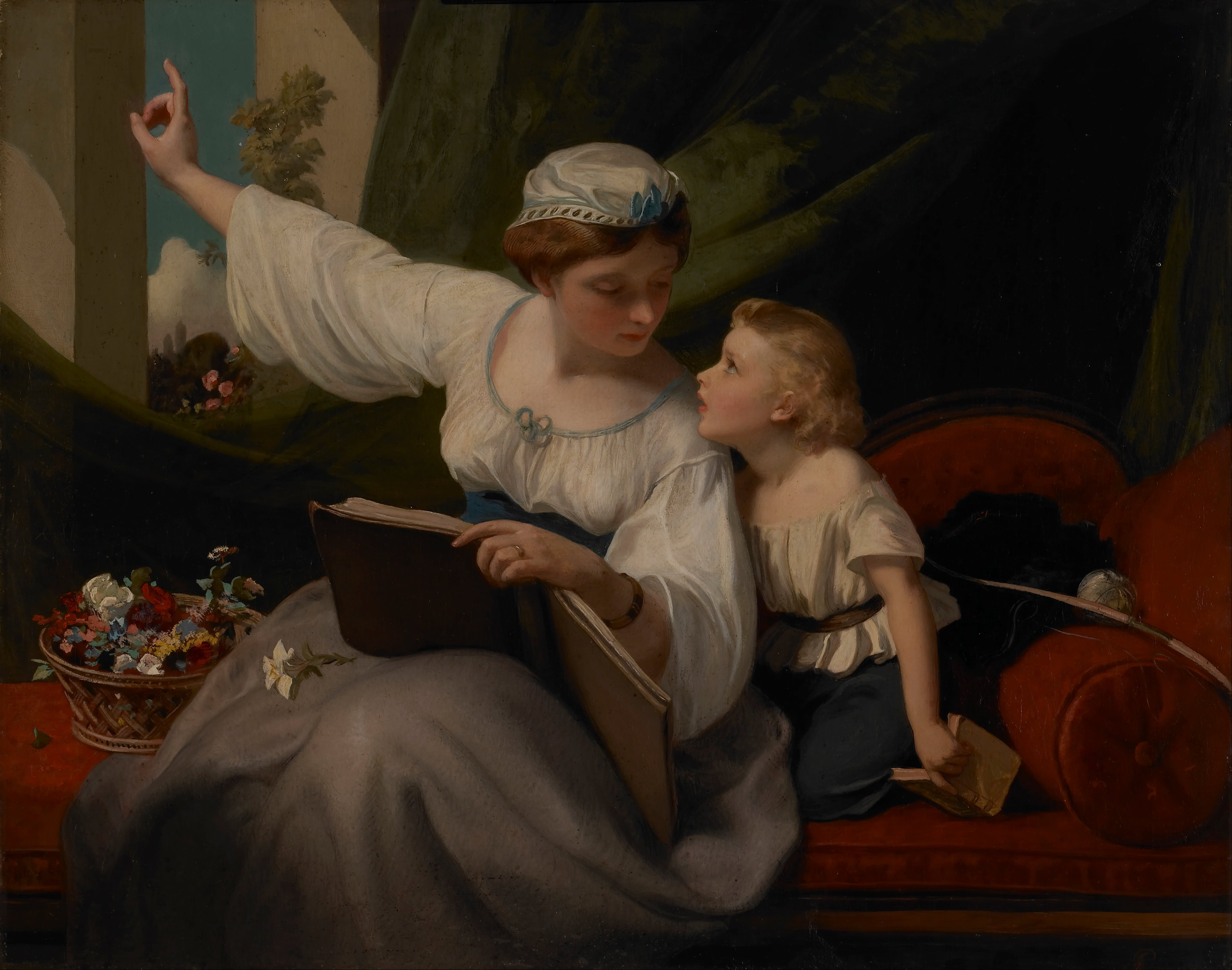
The Fairy Tale, a painting by James Sant in 1845

Some folklorists prefer to use the German term Märchen or "wonder tale" to refer to the genre rather than fairy tale, a practice given weight by the definition of Thompson in his 1977 [1946] edition of The Folktale:

"...a tale of some length involving a succession of motifs or episodes. It moves in an unreal world without definite locality or definite creatures and is filled with the marvellous. In this never-never land, humble heroes kill adversaries, succeed to kingdoms and marry princesses."

The characters and motifs of fairy tales are simple and archetypal: princesses and goose-girls; youngest sons and gallant princes; ogres, giants, dragons, and trolls; wicked stepmothers and false heroes; fairy godmothers and other magical helpers, often talking animals; glass mountains; and prohibitions and breaking of prohibitions.

== Definition ==
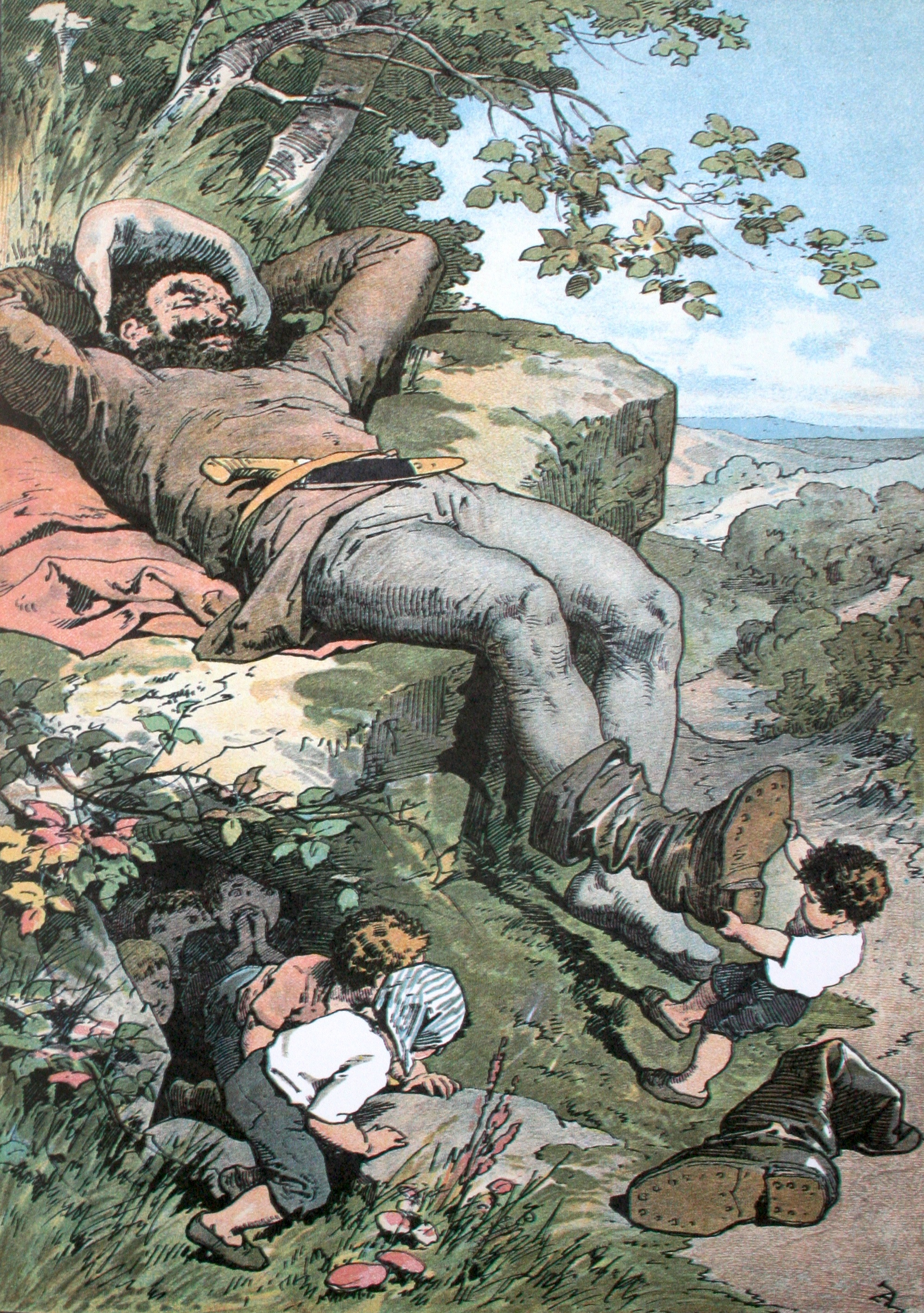
Hop-o'-My-Thumb and the ogre in an 1865 illustration

Although the fairy tale is a distinct genre within the larger category of folktale, the definition that marks a work as a fairy tale is a source of considerable dispute. The term itself comes from the translation of Madame D'Aulnoy's Conte de fées, first used in her collection in 1697. Common parlance conflates fairy tales with beast fables and other folktales, and scholars differ on the degree to which the presence of fairies and/or similarly mythical beings (e.g., elves, goblins, trolls, giants, huge monsters, or mermaids) should be taken as a differentiator. Vladimir Propp, in his Morphology of the Folktale, criticized the common distinction between "fairy tales" and "animal tales" on the grounds that many tales contained both fantastic elements and animals. Nevertheless, to select works for his analysis, Propp used all Russian folktales classified as folklore, Aarne–Thompson–Uther Index 300–749,—in a cataloguing system that made such a distinction—to gain a clear set of tales. His own analysis identified fairy tales by their plot elements, but that in itself has been criticized, as the analysis does not lend itself easily to tales that do not involve a quest, and the same plot elements are found in non-fairy tale works.

Were I asked, what is a fairytale? I should reply, Read Undine: that is a fairytale ... of all fairytales I know, I think Undine the most beautiful.

— George MacDonald, The Fantastic Imagination

As Stith Thompson points out, talking animals and the presence of magic seem to be more common to the fairy tale than fairies themselves. However, the mere presence of animals that talk does not make a tale a fairy tale, especially when the animal is clearly a mask on a human face, as in fables.

In his essay "On Fairy-Stories", J. R. R. Tolkien agreed with the exclusion of "fairies" from the definition, defining fairy tales as stories about the adventures of men in Faërie, the land of fairies, fairytale princes and princesses, dwarves, elves, and not only other magical species but many other marvels. However, the same essay excludes tales that are often considered fairy tales, citing as an example The Monkey's Heart, which Andrew Lang included in The Lilac Fairy Book.

Steven Swann Jones identified the presence of magic as the feature by which fairy tales can be distinguished from other sorts of folktales. Davidson and Chaudri identify "transformation" as the key feature of the genre. From a psychological point of view, Jean Chiriac argued for the necessity of the fantastic in these narratives.

In terms of aesthetic values, Italo Calvino cited the fairy tale as a prime example of "quickness" in literature, because of the economy and concision of the tales.

=== History of the genre ===
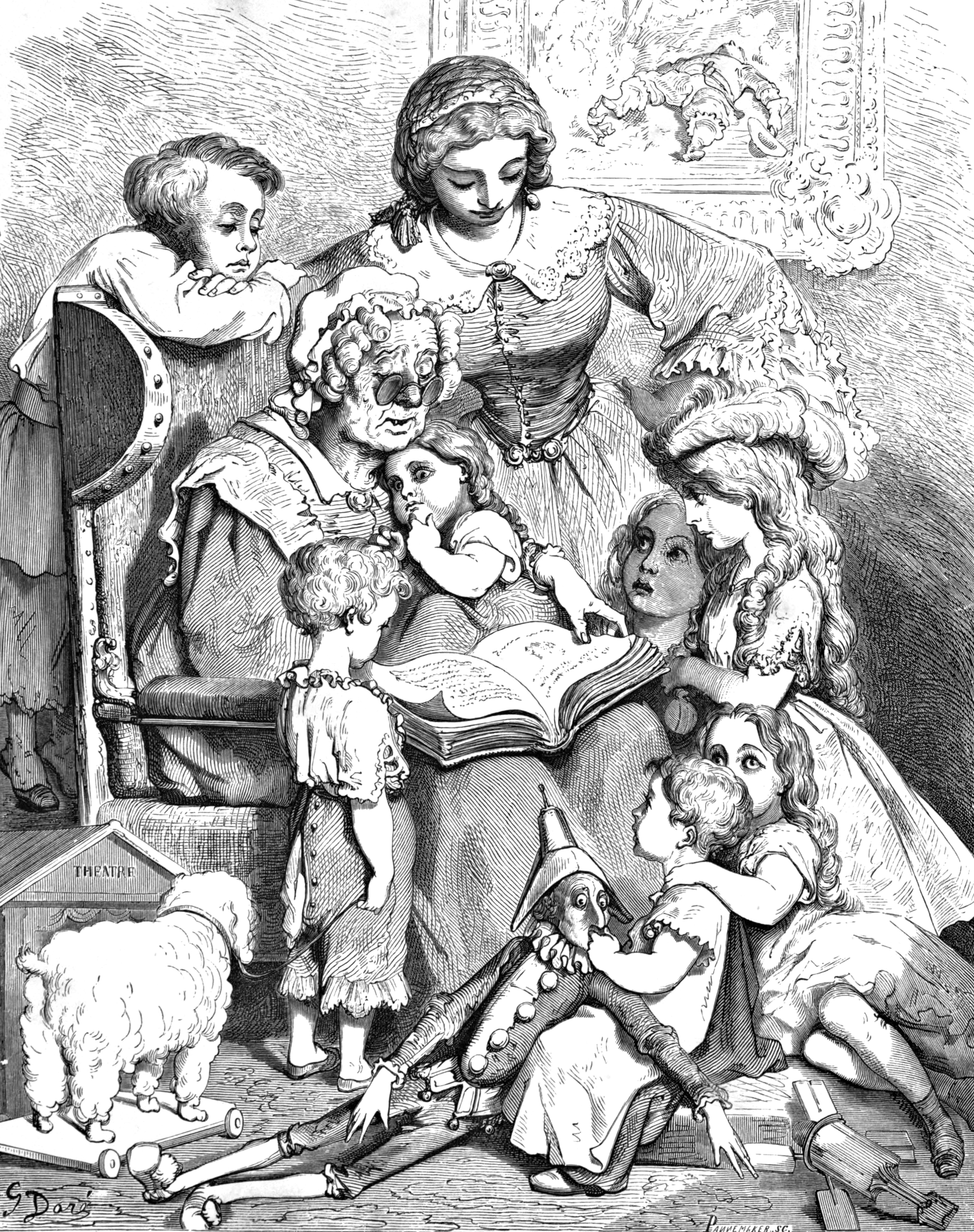
A picture by Gustave Doré of Mother Goose reading written (literary) fairy tales

Originally, stories that would contemporarily be considered fairy tales were not marked out as a separate genre. The German term "Märchen" stems from the old German word "Mär", which means news or tale. The word "Märchen" is the diminutive of the word "Mär", therefore it means a "little story". Together with the common beginning "once upon a time", this tells us that a fairy tale or a märchen was originally a little story from a long time ago when the world was still magic. (Indeed, one less regular German opening is "In the old times when wishing was still effective".)

The French writers and adaptors of the conte de fées genre often included fairies in their stories; the genre name became "fairy tale" in English translation and "gradually eclipsed the more general term folk tale that covered a wide variety of oral tales". Jack Zipes also attributes this shift to changing sociopolitical conditions in the seventeenth and eighteenth centuries that led to the trivialization of these stories by the upper classes.

Roots of the genre come from different oral stories passed down in European cultures. The genre was first marked out by writers of the Renaissance, such as Giovanni Francesco Straparola and Giambattista Basile, and stabilized through the works of later collectors such as Charles Perrault and the Brothers Grimm. In this evolution, the name was coined when the précieuses took up writing literary stories; Madame d'Aulnoy invented the term Conte de fée, or fairy tale, in the late 17th century.

Before the definition of the genre of fantasy, many works that would now be classified as fantasy were termed "fairy tales", including Tolkien's The Hobbit, George Orwell's Animal Farm, and L. Frank Baum's The Wonderful Wizard of Oz. Indeed, Tolkien's "On Fairy-Stories" includes discussions of world-building and is considered a vital part of fantasy criticism. Although fantasy, particularly the subgenre of fairytale fantasy, draws heavily on fairy tale motifs, the genres are now regarded as distinct.

=== Folk and literary ===
The fairy tale, told orally, is a sub-class of the folktale. Many writers have written in the form of the fairy tale. These are the literary fairy tales, or Kunstmärchen. The oldest forms, from Panchatantra to the Pentamerone, show considerable reworking from the oral form. The Grimm brothers were among the first to try to preserve the features of oral tales. Yet the stories printed under the Grimm name have been considerably reworked to fit the written form.

Literary fairy tales and oral fairy tales freely exchanged plots, motifs, and elements with one another and with the tales of foreign lands. The literary fairy tale came into fashion during the 17th century, developed by aristocratic women as a parlour game. This, in turn, helped to maintain the oral tradition. According to Jack Zipes, "The subject matter of the conversations consisted of literature, mores, taste, and etiquette, whereby the speakers all endeavoured to portray ideal situations in the most effective oratorical style that would gradually have a major effect on literary forms." Many 18th-century folklorists attempted to recover the "pure" folktale, uncontaminated by literary versions. Yet while oral fairy tales likely existed for thousands of years before the literary forms, there is no pure folktale, and each literary fairy tale draws on folk traditions, if only in parody. This makes it impossible to trace forms of transmission of a fairy tale. Oral story-tellers have been known to read literary fairy tales to increase their own stock of stories and treatments.

== History ==
Pages from a printed edition of the 14th-century Chinese "wonder tales" collection Jiandeng Xinhua by Qu You; the collection is considered to be one of the most influential East Asian works of fiction.

The oral tradition of the fairy tale came long before the written page. Tales were told or enacted dramatically, rather than written down, and handed down from generation to generation. Because of this, the history of their development is necessarily obscure and blurred. Fairy tales appear, now and again, in written literature throughout literate cultures, (Note: Scholars John Th. Honti and Gédeon Huet asserted the existence of fairy tales in ancient and medieval literature, as well as in classical mythology.) (Note: Even further back, according to professor Berlanga Fernández, elements of international "Märchen" show "exact parallels and themes (...) that seem to be common with Greek folklore and later tradition".) as in The Golden Ass, which includes Cupid and Psyche (Roman, 100–200 AD), or the Panchatantra (India 3rd century BC), but it is unknown to what extent these reflect the actual folk tales even of their own time. The stylistic evidence indicates that these, and many later collections, reworked folk tales into literary forms. What they do show is that the fairy tale has ancient roots, older than the Arabian Nights collection of magical tales (compiled circa 1500 AD), such as Vikram and the Vampire, and Bel and the Dragon. Besides such collections and individual tales, in China Taoist philosophers such as Liezi and Zhuangzi recounted fairy tales in their philosophical works. In the broader definition of the genre, the first famous Western fairy tales are those of Aesop (6th century BC) in ancient Greece.

Scholarship points out that Medieval literature contains early versions or predecessors of later known tales and motifs, such as the grateful dead, The Bird Lover or the quest for the lost wife. (Note: Folklorist Alexander Haggerty Krappe argued that most of historical variants of tale types are traceable to the Middle Ages, and some are attested in literary works of classical antiquity. Likewise, Francis Lee Utley showed that medieval Celtic literature and Arthurian mythos contain recognizable motifs of tale types described in the international index.) Recognizable folktales have also been reworked as the plot of folk literature and oral epics.

Jack Zipes writes in When Dreams Came True, "There are fairy tale elements in Chaucer's The Canterbury Tales, Edmund Spenser's The Faerie Queene, and in many of William Shakespeare plays." King Lear can be considered a literary variant of fairy tales such as Water and Salt and Cap O' Rushes. The tale itself resurfaced in Western literature in the 16th and 17th centuries, with The Facetious Nights of Straparola by Giovanni Francesco Straparola (Italy, 1550 and 1553), which contains many fairy tales in its inset tales, and the Neapolitan tales of Giambattista Basile (Naples, 1634–1636), which are all fairy tales. Carlo Gozzi made use of many fairy tale motifs among his Commedia dell'Arte scenarios, including among them one based on The Love For Three Oranges (1761). Simultaneously, Pu Songling, in China, included many fairy tales in his collection, Strange Stories from a Chinese Studio (published posthumously, 1766), which has been described by Yuken Fujita of Keio University as having "a reputation as the most outstanding short story collection." The fairy tale itself became popular among the précieuses of upper-class France (1690–1710), and among the tales told in that time were the ones of La Fontaine and the Contes of Charles Perrault (1697), who fixed the forms of Sleeping Beauty and Cinderella. Although Straparola's, Basile's and Perrault's collections contain the oldest known forms of various fairy tales, on the stylistic evidence, all the writers rewrote the tales for literary effect.

=== The Salon Era ===
In the mid-17th century, a vogue for magical tales emerged among the intellectuals who frequented the salons of Paris. These salons were regular gatherings hosted by prominent aristocratic women, where women and men could gather together to discuss the issues of the day.

In the 1630s, aristocratic women began to gather in their own living rooms, salons, to discuss the topics of their choice: arts and letters, politics, and social matters of immediate concern to the women of their class: marriage, love, financial and physical independence, and access to education. This was a time when women were barred from receiving a formal education. Some of the most gifted women writers of the period came out of these early salons (such as Madeleine de Scudéry and Madame de Lafayette), which encouraged women's independence and pushed against the gender barriers that defined their lives. The salonnières argued particularly for love and intellectual compatibility between the sexes, opposing the system of arranged marriages.

Sometime in the middle of the 17th century, a passion for the conversational parlour game based on the plots of old folk tales swept through the salons. Each salonnière was called upon to retell an old tale or rework an old theme, spinning clever new stories that not only showcased verbal agility and imagination but also slyly commented on the conditions of aristocratic life. Great emphasis was placed on a mode of delivery that seemed natural and spontaneous. The decorative language of the fairy tales served an important function: disguising the rebellious subtext of the stories and sliding them past the court censors. Critiques of court life (and even of the king) were embedded in extravagant tales and in dark, sharply dystopian ones. Not surprisingly, the tales by women often featured young (but clever) aristocratic girls whose lives were controlled by the arbitrary whims of fathers, kings, and elderly wicked fairies, as well as tales in which groups of wise fairies (i.e., intelligent, independent women) stepped in and put all to rights.

The salon tales as they were originally written and published have been preserved in a monumental work called Le Cabinet des Fées, an enormous collection of stories from the 17th and 18th centuries.

=== Later works ===
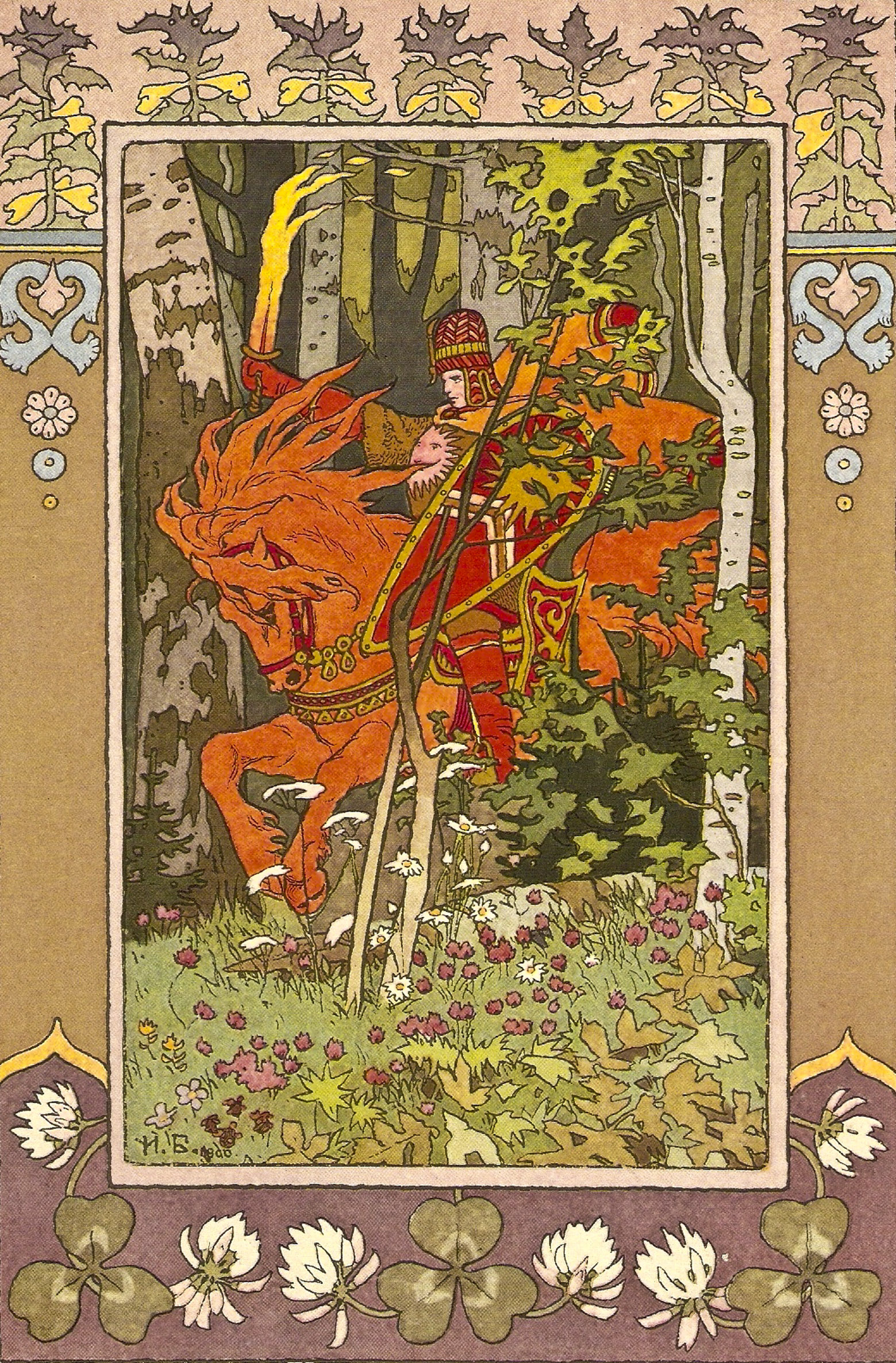
Ivan Bilibin (1876–1942)'s illustration of the Russian fairy tale about Vasilisa the Beautiful

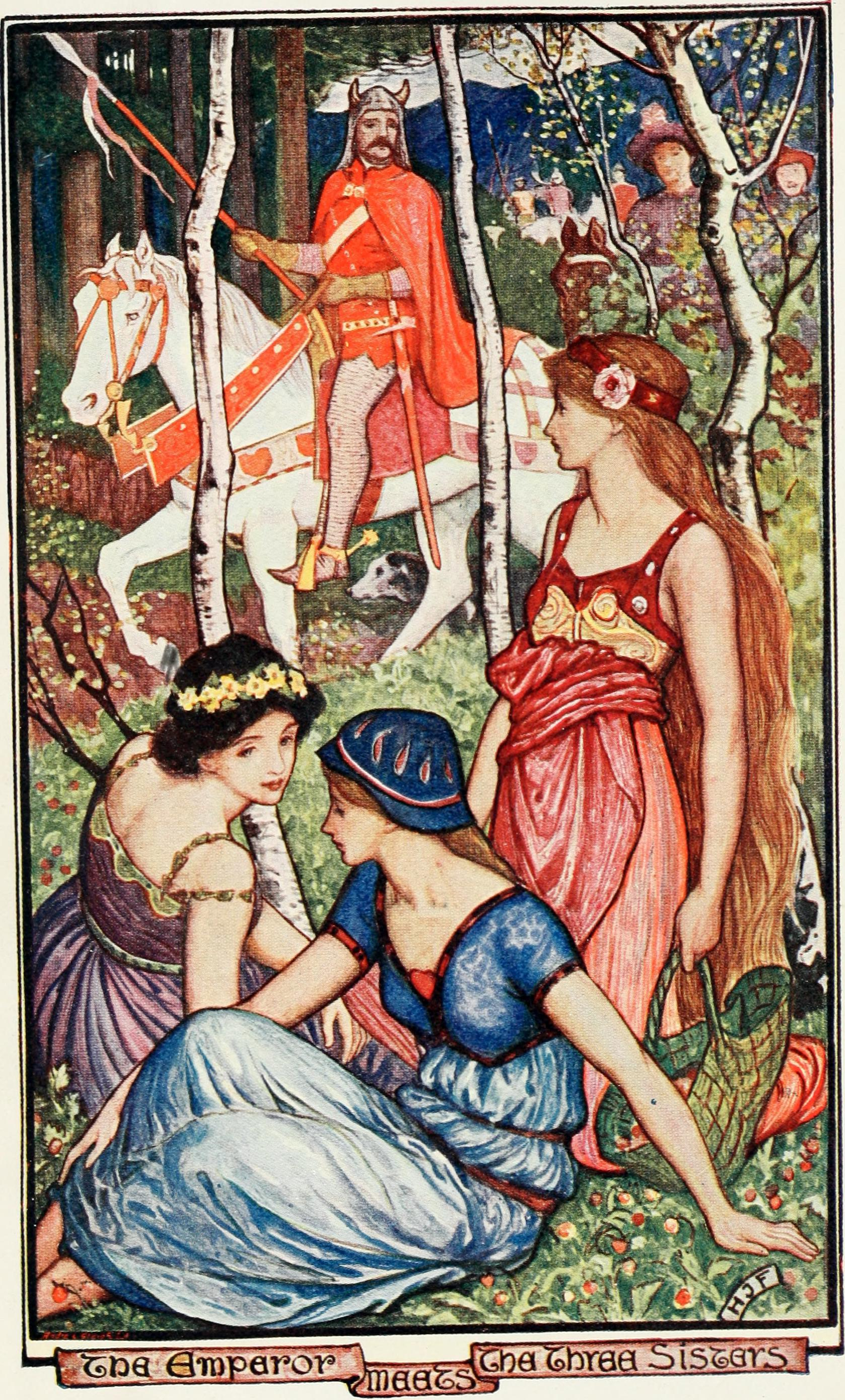
The Violet Fairy Book (1906)

The first collectors to attempt to preserve not only the plot and characters of the tale, but also the style in which they were told, was the Brothers Grimm, collecting German fairy tales; this meant although their first edition (1812 and 1815) remains a treasure for folklorists, they rewrote the tales in later editions to make them more acceptable, which ensured their sales and the later popularity of their work.

Such literary forms did not merely draw from the folktale, but also influenced folktales in turn. The Brothers Grimm rejected several tales for their collection, though told orally to them by Germans, because the tales derived from Perrault, and they concluded they were thereby French and not German tales; an oral version of "Bluebeard" was thus rejected, and the tale of Little Briar Rose, clearly related to Perrault's "Sleeping Beauty", was included only because Jacob Grimm convinced his brother that the figure of Brynhildr, from much earlier Norse mythology, proved that the sleeping princess was authentically Germanic folklore.

This consideration of whether to keep Sleeping Beauty reflected a belief common among folklorists of the 19th century: that the folk tradition preserved fairy tales in forms from pre-history except when "contaminated" by such literary forms, leading people to tell inauthentic tales. The rural, illiterate, and uneducated peasants, if suitably isolated, were the folk and would tell pure folk tales. Sometimes they regarded fairy tales as a form of fossil, the remnants of a once-perfect tale. However, further research has concluded that fairy tales never had a fixed form, and regardless of literary influence, the tellers constantly altered them for their own purposes.

The work of the Brothers Grimm influenced other collectors, both inspiring them to collect tales and leading them to similarly believe, in a spirit of romantic nationalism, that the fairy tales of a country were particularly representative of it, to the neglect of cross-cultural influence. Among those influenced were the Russian Alexander Afanasyev (first published in 1866), the Norwegians Peter Christen Asbjørnsen and Jørgen Moe (first published in 1845), the Romanian Petre Ispirescu (first published in 1874), the English Joseph Jacobs (first published in 1890), and Jeremiah Curtin, an American who collected Irish tales (first published in 1890). Ethnographers collected fairy tales throughout the world, finding similar tales in Africa, the Americas, and Australia; Andrew Lang was able to draw on not only the written tales of Europe and Asia, but those collected by ethnographers, to fill his "coloured" fairy books series. They also encouraged other collectors of fairy tales, as when Yei Theodora Ozaki created a collection, Japanese Fairy Tales (1908), after encouragement from Lang. Simultaneously, writers such as Hans Christian Andersen and George MacDonald continued the tradition of literary fairy tales. Andersen's work sometimes drew on old folktales, but more often deployed fairytale motifs and plots in new tales. MacDonald incorporated fairytale motifs both in new literary fairy tales, such as The Light Princess, and in works of the genre that would become fantasy, as in The Princess and the Goblin or Lilith.

== Cross-cultural transmission ==
Two theories of origins have attempted to explain the common elements in fairy tales found spread over continents. One is that a single point of origin generated any given tale, which then spread over the centuries; the other is that such fairy tales stem from common human experience and therefore can appear separately in many different origins.

Fairy tales with very similar plots, characters, and motifs are found spread across many different cultures. Many researchers hold this to be caused by the spread of such tales, as people repeat tales they have heard in foreign lands, although the oral nature makes it impossible to trace the route except by inference. Folklorists have attempted to determine the origin by internal evidence, which can not always be clear; Joseph Jacobs, comparing the Scottish tale The Ridere of Riddles with the version collected by the Brothers Grimm, The Riddle, noted that in The Ridere of Riddles one hero ends up polygamously married, which might point to an ancient custom, but in The Riddle, the simpler riddle might argue greater antiquity.

Folklorists of the "Finnish" (or historical-geographical) school attempted to place fairy tales to their origin, with inconclusive results. Sometimes influence, especially within a limited area and time, is clearer, as when considering the influence of Perrault's tales on those collected by the Brothers Grimm. Little Briar-Rose appears to stem from Perrault's The Sleeping Beauty, as the Grimms' tale appears to be the only independent German variant. Similarly, the close agreement between the opening of the Grimms' version of Little Red Riding Hood and Perrault's tale points to an influence, although the Grimms' version adds a different ending (perhaps derived from The Wolf and the Seven Young Kids).

Fairy tales tend to take on the color of their location, through the choice of motifs, the style in which they are told, and the depiction of character and local color.

The Brothers Grimm believed that European fairy tales derived from the cultural history shared by all Indo-European peoples and were therefore ancient, far older than written records. This view is supported by research by the anthropologist Jamie Tehrani and the folklorist Sara Graca Da Silva using phylogenetic analysis, a technique developed by evolutionary biologists to trace the relatedness of living and fossil species. Among the tales analysed were Jack and the Beanstalk, traced to the time of splitting of Eastern and Western Indo-European, over 5000 years ago. Both Beauty and the Beast and Rumpelstiltskin appear to have been created some 4000 years ago. The story of The Smith and the Devil (Deal with the Devil) appears to date from the Bronze Age, some 6000 years ago. Various other studies converge to suggest that some fairy tales, for example the swan maiden, could go back to the Upper Palaeolithic.

== Association with children ==
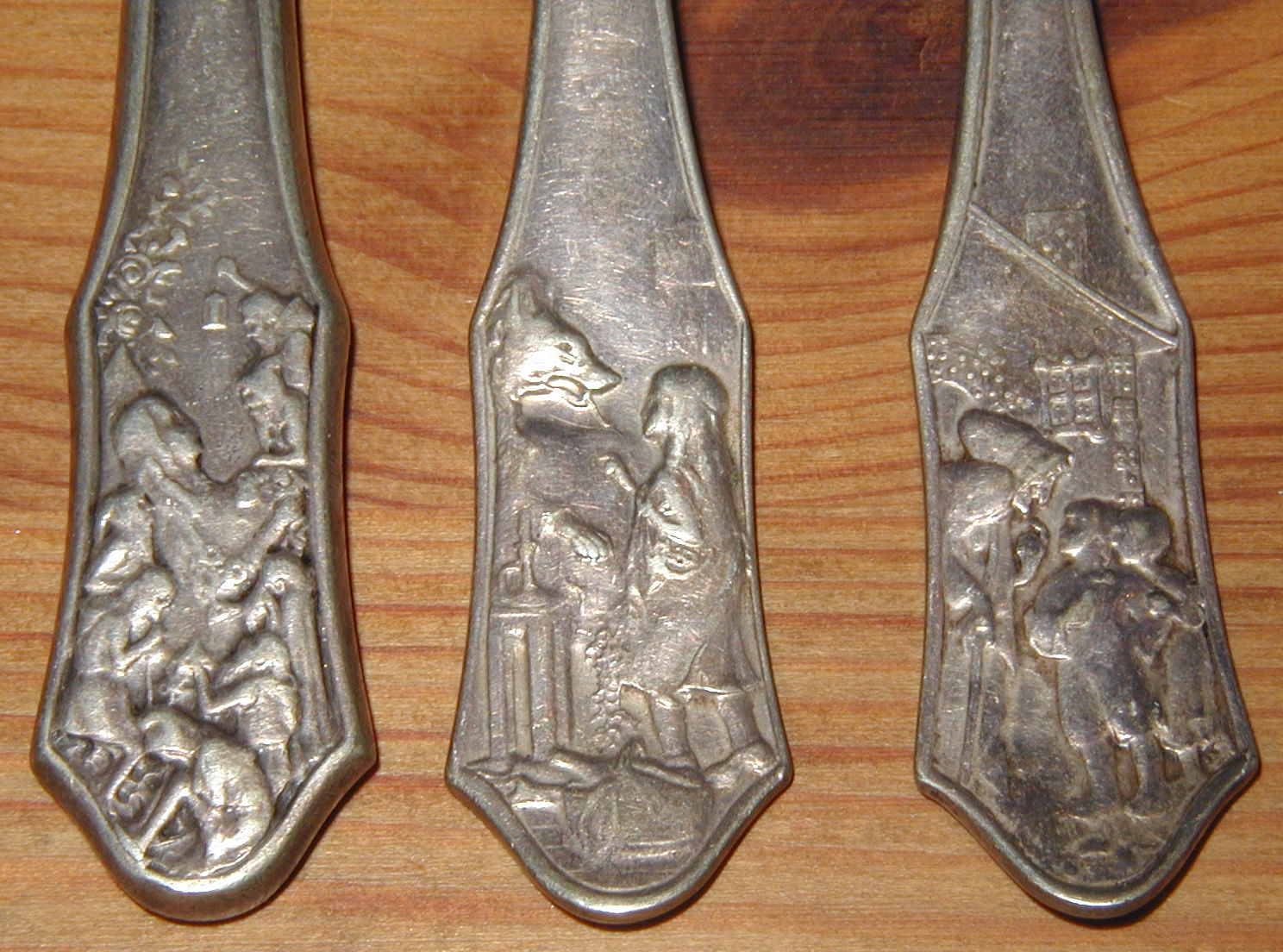
Cutlery for children. Detail showing fairy-tale scenes: Snow White, Little Red Riding Hood, Hansel and Gretel.

Originally, adults were the audience of fairy tales just as often as children. Literary fairy tales appeared in works intended for adults, but in the 19th and 20th centuries the fairy tale became associated with children's literature.

The précieuses, including Madame d'Aulnoy, intended their works for adults, but regarded their source as the tales that servants, or other women of lower class, would tell to children. Indeed, a novel of that time, depicting a countess's suitor offering to tell such a tale, has the countess exclaim that she loves fairy tales as if she were still a child. Among the late précieuses, Jeanne-Marie Leprince de Beaumont redacted a version of Beauty and the Beast for children, and it is her tale that is best known today. The Brothers Grimm titled their collection Children's and Household Tales and rewrote their tales after complaints that they were not suitable for children.

In the modern era, fairy tales were altered so that they could be read to children. The Brothers Grimm concentrated mostly on sexual references; Rapunzel, in the first edition, revealed the prince's visits by asking why her clothing had grown tight, thus letting the witch deduce that she was pregnant, but in subsequent editions carelessly revealed that it was easier to pull up the prince than the witch. On the other hand, in many respects, violence‍—‌particularly when punishing villains‍—‌was increased. Other, later revisions cut out violence; J. R. R. Tolkien noted that The Juniper Tree often had its cannibalistic stew cut out in a version intended for children. The moralizing strain in the Victorian era altered the classical tales to teach lessons, as when George Cruikshank rewrote Cinderella in 1854 to contain temperance themes. His acquaintance Charles Dickens protested, "In an utilitarian age, of all other times, it is a matter of grave importance that fairy tales should be respected."

Psychoanalysts such as Bruno Bettelheim, who regarded the cruelty of older fairy tales as indicative of psychological conflicts, strongly criticized this expurgation, because it weakened their usefulness to both children and adults as ways of symbolically resolving issues. Fairy tales do teach children how to deal with difficult times. To quote Rebecca Walters (2017, p. 56) "Fairytales and folktales are part of the cultural conserve that can be used to address children's fears ... and give them some role training in an approach that honors the children's window of tolerance". These fairy tales teach children how to deal with certain social situations and help them to find their place in society. Fairy tales teach children other important lessons too. For example, Tsitsani et al. carried out a study on children to determine the benefits of fairy tales. Parents of the children who took part in the study found that fairy tales, especially the color in them, triggered their child's imagination as they read them. Jungian Analyst and fairy tale scholar Marie Louise Von Franz interprets fairy tales (Note: For a comprehensive introduction into fairy tale interpretation, and main terms of Jungian Psychology (Anima, Animus, Shadow) see Franz 1970.) based on Jung's view of fairy tales as a spontaneous and naive product of the soul, which can only express what soul is. That means, she looks at fairy tales as images of different phases of experiencing the reality of the soul. They are the "purest and simplest expression of collective unconscious psychic processes" and "they represent the archetypes in their simplest, barest and most concise form" because they are less overlaid with conscious material than myths and legends. "In this pure form, the archetypal images afford us the best clues to the understanding of the processes going on in the collective psyche". "The fairy tale itself is its own best explanation; that is, its meaning is contained in the totality of its motifs connected by the thread of the story. [...] Every fairy tale is a relatively closed system compounding one essential psychological meaning which is expressed in a series of symbolical pictures and events and is discoverable in these". "I have come to the conclusion that all fairy tales endeavour to describe one and the same psychic fact, but a fact so complex and far-reaching and so difficult for us to realize in all its different aspects that hundreds of tales and thousands of repetitions with a musician's variation are needed until this unknown fact is delivered into consciousness; and even then the theme is not exhausted. This unknown fact is what Jung calls the Self, which is the psychic reality of the collective unconscious. [...] Every archetype is in its essence only one aspect of the collective unconscious as well as always representing also the whole collective unconscious.

Other famous people commented on the importance of fairy tales, especially for children. For example, G. K. Chesterton argued that:

Fairy tales, then, are not responsible for producing in children fear, or any of the shapes of fear; fairy tales do not give the child the idea of the evil or the ugly; that is in the child already, because it is in the world already. Fairy tales do not give the child his first idea of bogey. What fairy tales give the child is his first clear idea of the possible defeat of bogey. The baby has known the dragon intimately ever since he had an imagination. What the fairy tale provides for him is a St. George to kill the dragon.

Albert Einstein once showed how important he believed fairy tales were for children's intelligence in the quote "If you want your children to be intelligent, read them fairytales. If you want them to be more intelligent, read them more fairytales."

The adaptation of fairy tales for children continues. Walt Disney's influential Snow White and the Seven Dwarfs was largely (although certainly not solely) intended for the children's market. The anime Magical Princess Minky Momo draws on the fairy tale Momotarō. Jack Zipes has spent many years working to make the older traditional stories accessible to modern readers and their children.

== Motherhood ==
Many fairy tales feature an absentee mother, as an example "Beauty and the Beast", "The Little Mermaid", "Little Red Riding Hood" and "Donkeyskin", where the mother is deceased or absent and unable to help the heroines. Mothers are depicted as absent or wicked in the most popular contemporary versions of tales like "Rapunzel", "Snow White", "Cinderella" and "Hansel and Gretel", however, some lesser known tales or variants such as those found in volumes edited by Angela Carter and Jane Yolen depict mothers in a more positive light.

Carter's protagonist in The Bloody Chamber is an impoverished piano student married to a Marquis who was much older than herself to "banish the spectre of poverty". The story is a variant on Bluebeard, a tale about a wealthy man who murders numerous young women. Carter's protagonist, who is unnamed, describes her mother as "eagle-featured" and "indomitable". Her mother is depicted as a woman who is prepared for violence, instead of hiding from it or sacrificing herself to it. The protagonist recalls how her mother kept an "antique service revolver" and once "shot a man-eating tiger with her own hand."

== Contemporary tales ==
=== Literary ===
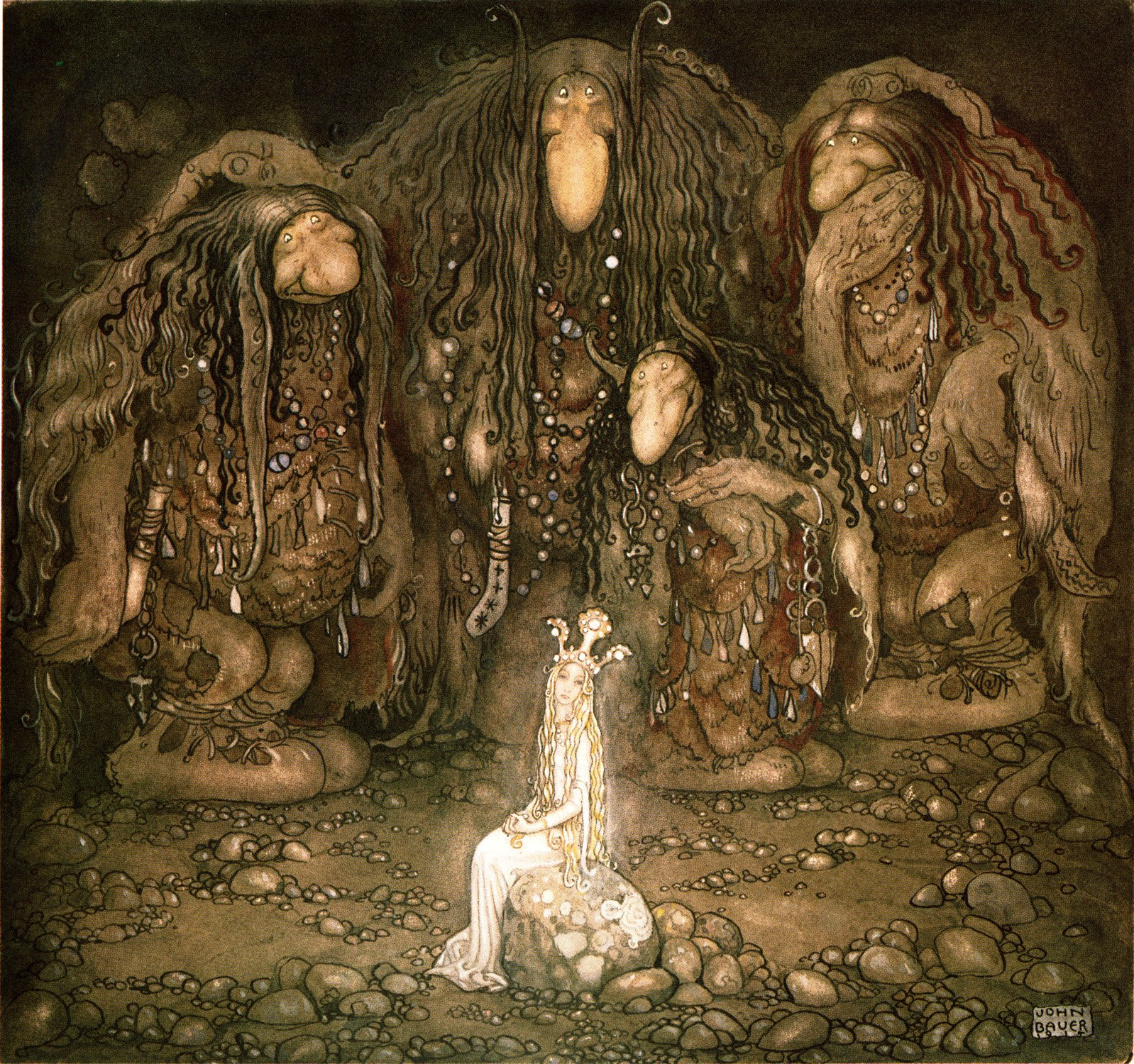
John Bauer's illustration of trolls and a princess from a collection of Swedish fairy tales

In contemporary literature, many authors have used the form of fairy tales for various reasons, such as examining the human condition from the simple framework a fairytale provides. Some authors seek to recreate a sense of the fantastic in a contemporary discourse. Some writers use fairy tale forms for modern issues; this can include using the psychological dramas implicit in the story, as when Robin McKinley retold Donkeyskin as the novel Deerskin, with emphasis on the abusive treatment the father of the tale dealt to his daughter. Sometimes, especially in children's literature, fairy tales are retold with a twist simply for comic effect, such as The Stinky Cheese Man by Jon Scieszka and The ASBO Fairy Tales by Chris Pilbeam. A common comic motif is a world where all the fairy tales take place, and the characters are aware of their role in the story, such as in the film series Shrek.

Other authors may have specific motives, such as multicultural or feminist reevaluations of predominantly Eurocentric masculine-dominated fairy tales, implying critique of older narratives. The figure of the damsel in distress has been particularly attacked by many feminist critics. Examples of narrative reversal rejecting this figure include The Paperbag Princess by Robert Munsch, a picture book aimed at children in which a princess rescues a prince, Angela Carter's The Bloody Chamber, which retells a number of fairy tales from a female point of view and Simon Hood's contemporary interpretation of various popular classics.

There are also many contemporary erotic retellings of fairy tales, which explicitly draw upon the original spirit of the tales, and are specifically for adults. Modern retellings focus on exploring the tale through use of the erotic, explicit sexuality, dark and/or comic themes, female empowerment, fetish and BDSM, multicultural, and heterosexual characters. Cleis Press has released several fairy tale-themed erotic anthologies, including Fairy Tale Lust, Lustfully Ever After, and A Princess Bound.

It may be hard to lay down the rule between fairy tales and fantasies that use fairy tale motifs, or even whole plots, but the distinction is commonly made, even within the works of a single author: George MacDonald's Lilith and Phantastes are regarded as fantasies, while his "The Light Princess", "The Golden Key", and "The Wise Woman" are commonly called fairy tales. The most notable distinction is that fairytale fantasies, like other fantasies, make use of novelistic writing conventions of prose, characterization, or setting.

=== Film ===
Fairy tales have been enacted dramatically; records exist of this in commedia dell'arte, and later in pantomime. Unlike oral and literacy form, fairy tales in film is considered one of the most effective way to convey the story to the audience. The advent of cinema has meant that such stories could be presented in a more plausible manner, with the use of special effects and animation. The Walt Disney Company has had a significant impact on the evolution of the fairy tale film. Some of the earliest short silent films from the Disney studio were based on fairy tales, and some fairy tales were adapted into shorts in the musical comedy series "Silly Symphony", such as Three Little Pigs. Walt Disney's first feature-length film Snow White and the Seven Dwarfs, released in 1937, was a ground-breaking film for fairy tales and, indeed, fantasy in general. With the cost of over 400 percent of the budget and more than 300 artists, assistants and animators, Snow White and the Seven Dwarfs was arguably one of the highest work force demanded film at that time. The studio even hired Don Graham to open animation training programs for more than 700 staff. As for the motion capture and personality expression, the studio used a dancer, Marjorie Celeste, from the beginning to the end for the best results. Disney and his creative successors have returned to traditional and literary fairy tales numerous times with films such as Cinderella (1950), Sleeping Beauty (1959), The Little Mermaid (1989) and Beauty and the Beast (1991). Disney's influence helped establish the fairy tale genre as a genre for children, and has been accused by some of bowdlerizing the gritty naturalism – and sometimes unhappy endings – of many folk fairy tales. However, others note that the softening of fairy tales occurred long before Disney, some of which was even done by the Grimm brothers themselves.

Many filmed fairy tales have been made primarily for children, from Disney's later works to Aleksandr Rou's retelling of Vasilissa the Beautiful, the first Soviet film to use Russian folk tales in a big-budget feature. Others have used the conventions of fairy tales to create new stories with sentiments more relevant to contemporary life, as in Labyrinth, My Neighbor Totoro, Happily N'Ever After, and the films of Michel Ocelot.

Other works have retold familiar fairy tales in a darker, more horrific or psychological variant aimed primarily at adults. Notable examples are Jean Cocteau's Beauty and the Beast and The Company of Wolves, based on Angela Carter's retelling of Little Red Riding Hood. Likewise, Princess Mononoke, Pan's Labyrinth, Suspiria, and Spike create new stories in this genre from fairy tale and folklore motifs.

In comics and animated TV series, The Sandman, Hellboy, Revolutionary Girl Utena, Princess Tutu, Fables, and MÄR all make use of standard fairy tale elements to various extents but are more accurately categorised as fairytale fantasy due to the definite locations and characters which a longer narrative requires.

A more modern cinematic fairy tale would be Luchino Visconti's Le Notti Bianche, starring Marcello Mastroianni before he became a superstar. It involves many of the romantic conventions of fairy tales, yet it takes place in post-World War II Italy, and it ends realistically.

In recent years, Disney has been dominating the fairy tale film industry by remaking their animated fairy tale films into live action. Examples include Maleficent (2014), Cinderella (2015), Beauty and the Beast (2017) and so on.

== Motifs ==
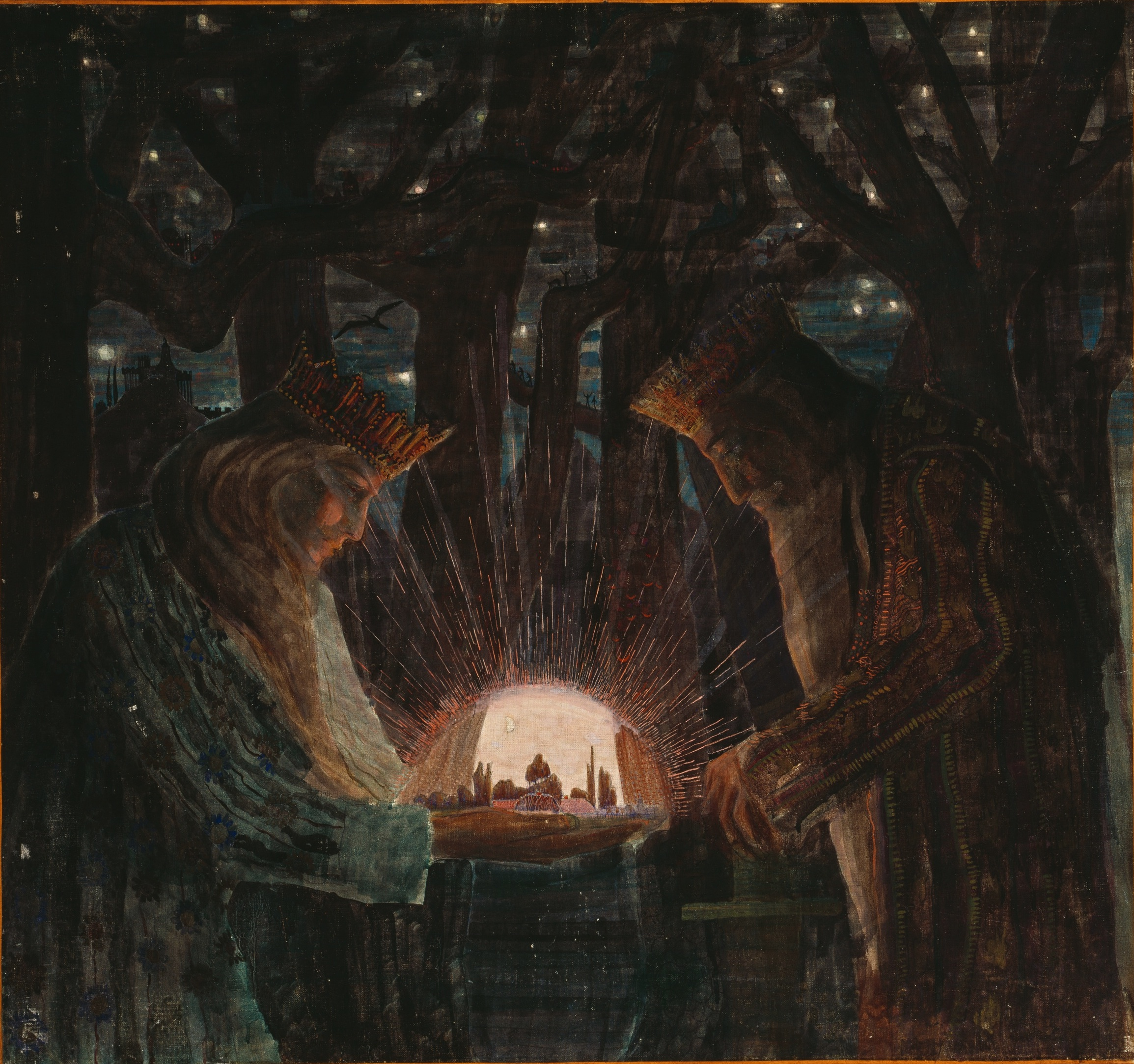
Kings' Fairy Tale, 1909, by Mikalojus Konstantinas Čiurlionis

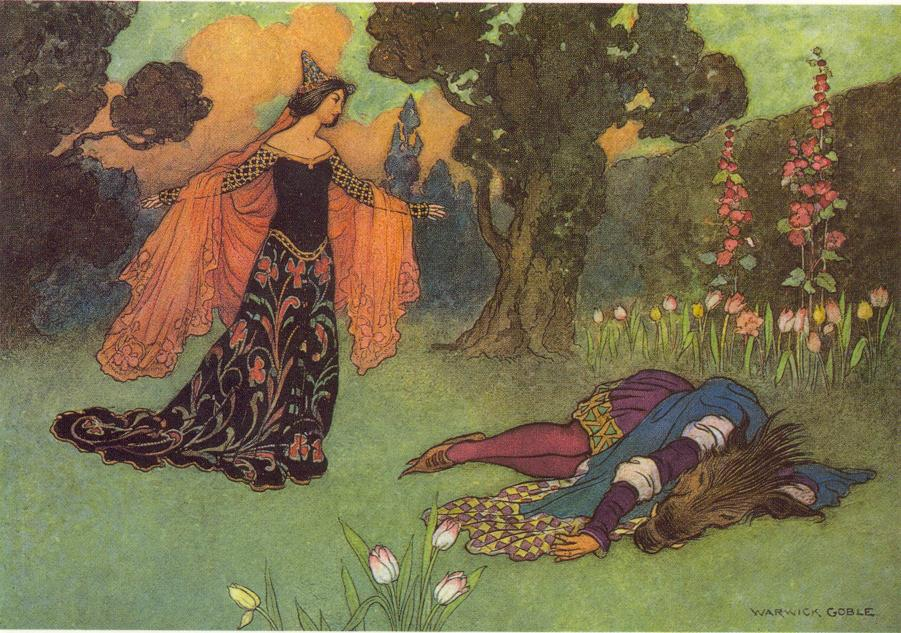
Beauty and the Beast, illustration by Warwick Goble

Any comparison of fairy tales quickly discovers that many fairy tales have features in common with each other. Two of the most influential classifications are those of Antti Aarne, as revised by Stith Thompson into the Aarne-Thompson classification system, and Vladimir Propp's Morphology of the Folk Tale.

=== Aarne-Thompson ===
This system groups fairy and folk tales according to their overall plot. Common, identifying features are picked out to decide which tales are grouped together. Much therefore depends on what features are regarded as decisive.

For instance, tales like Cinderella‍—‌in which a persecuted heroine, with the help of the fairy godmother or similar magical helper, attends an event (or three) in which she wins the love of a prince and is identified as his true bride‍—‌are classified as type 510, the persecuted heroine. Some such tales are The Wonderful Birch; Aschenputtel; Katie Woodencloak; The Story of Tam and Cam; Ye Xian; Cap O' Rushes; Catskin; Fair, Brown and Trembling; Finette Cendron; Allerleirauh.

Further analysis of the tales shows that in Cinderella, The Wonderful Birch, The Story of Tam and Cam, Ye Xian, and Aschenputtel, the heroine is persecuted by her stepmother and refused permission to go to the ball or other event, and in Fair, Brown and Trembling and Finette Cendron by her sisters and other female figures, and these are grouped as 510A; while in Cap O' Rushes, Catskin, and Allerleirauh, the heroine is driven from home by her father's persecutions, and must take work in a kitchen elsewhere, and these are grouped as 510B. But in Katie Woodencloak, she is driven from home by her stepmother's persecutions and must take service in a kitchen elsewhere, and in Tattercoats, she is refused permission to go to the ball by her grandfather. Given these features common with both types of 510, Katie Woodencloak is classified as 510A because the villain is the stepmother, and Tattercoats as 510B because the grandfather fills the father's role.

This system has its weaknesses in the difficulty of having no way to classify subportions of a tale as motifs. Rapunzel is type 310 (The Maiden in the Tower), but it opens with a child being demanded in return for stolen food, as does Puddocky; but Puddocky is not a Maiden in the Tower tale, while The Canary Prince, which opens with a jealous stepmother, is.

It also lends itself to emphasis on the common elements, to the extent that the folklorist describes The Black Bull of Norroway as the same story as Beauty and the Beast. This can be useful as a shorthand but can also erase the coloring and details of a story.

=== Morphology ===
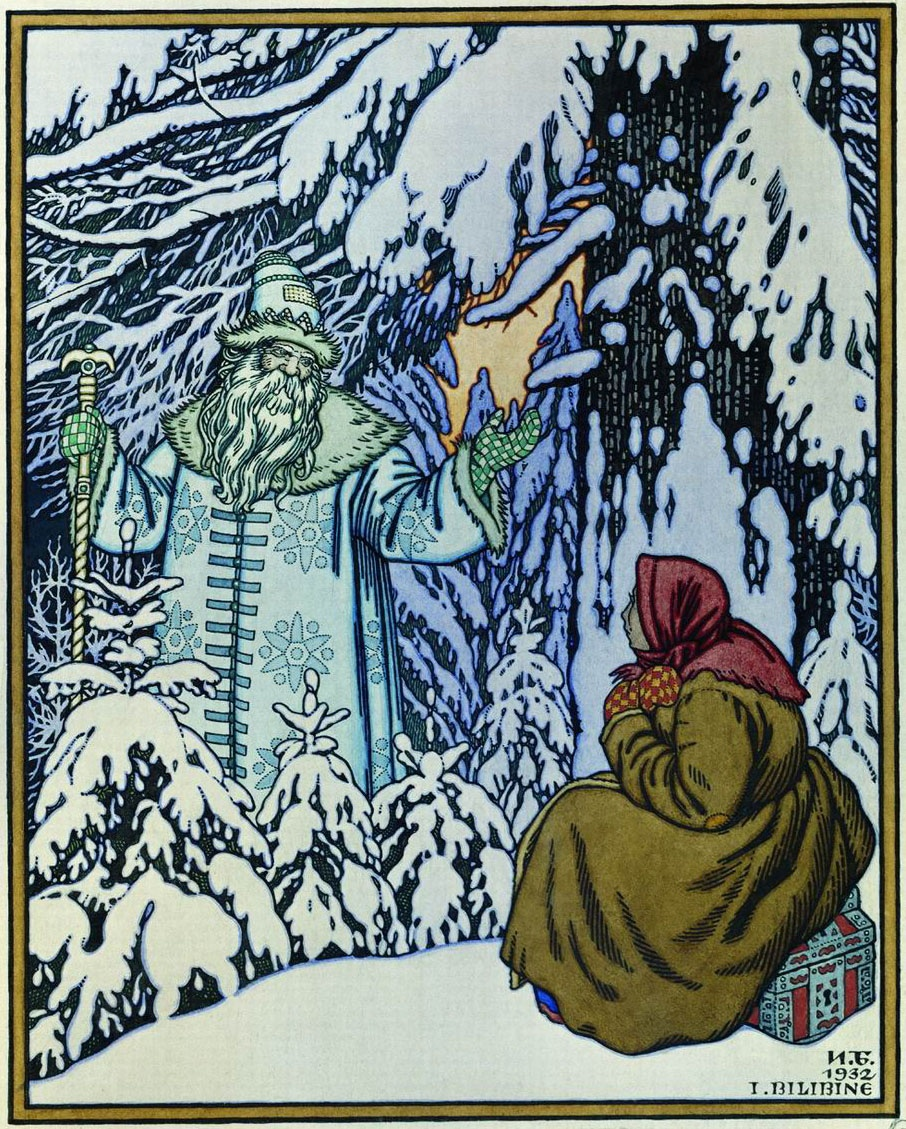
Father Frost acts as a donor in the Russian fairy tale Father Frost, testing the heroine before bestowing riches upon her

Vladimir Propp specifically studied a collection of Russian fairy tales, but his analysis has been found useful for the tales of other countries. Having criticized Aarne-Thompson type analysis for ignoring what motifs did in stories, and because the motifs used were not clearly distinct, he analyzed the tales for the function each character and action fulfilled and concluded that a tale was composed of thirty-one elements ('functions') and seven characters or 'spheres of action' ('the princess and her father' are a single sphere). While the elements were not all required for all tales, when they appeared they did so in an invariant order – except that each individual element might be negated twice, so that it would appear three times, as when, in Brother and Sister, the brother resists drinking from enchanted streams twice, so that it is the third that enchants him. Propp's 31 functions also fall within six 'stages' (preparation, complication, transference, struggle, return, recognition), and a stage can also be repeated, which can affect the perceived order of elements.

One such element is the donor who gives the hero magical assistance, often after testing him. In The Golden Bird, the talking fox tests the hero by warning him against entering an inn and, after he succeeds, helps him find the object of his quest; in The Boy Who Drew Cats, the priest advised the hero to stay in small places at night, which protects him from an evil spirit; in Cinderella, the fairy godmother gives Cinderella the dresses she needs to attend the ball, as their mothers' spirits do in Bawang Putih Bawang Merah and The Wonderful Birch; in The Fox Sister, a Buddhist monk gives the brothers magical bottles to protect against the fox spirit. The roles can be more complicated. In The Red Ettin, the role is split into the mother‍—‌who offers the hero the whole of a journey cake with her curse or half with her blessing‍—‌and when he takes the half, a fairy who gives him advice; in Mr Simigdáli, the sun, the moon, and the stars all give the heroine a magical gift. Characters who are not always the donor can act like the donor. In Kallo and the Goblins, the villain goblins also give the heroine gifts, because they are tricked; in Schippeitaro, the evil cats betray their secret to the hero, giving him the means to defeat them. Other fairy tales, such as The Story of the Youth Who Went Forth to Learn What Fear Was, do not feature the donor.

Analogies have been drawn between this and the analysis of myths into the hero's journey.

== Interpretations ==
Many fairy tales have been interpreted for their (purported) significance. One mythological interpretation saw many fairy tales, including Hansel and Gretel, Sleeping Beauty, and The Frog King, as solar myths; this mode of interpretation subsequently became rather less popular. Freudian, Jungian, and other psychological analyses have also explicated many tales, but no mode of interpretation has established itself definitively.

Specific analyses have often been criticized for lending great importance to motifs that are not, in fact, integral to the tale; this has often stemmed from treating one instance of a fairy tale as the definitive text, where the tale has been told and retold in many variations. In variants of Bluebeard, the wife's curiosity is betrayed by a blood-stained key, by an egg's breaking, or by the singing of a rose she wore, without affecting the tale, but interpretations of specific variants have claimed that the precise object is integral to the tale.

Other folklorists have interpreted tales as historical documents. Many German folklorists, believing the tales to have preserved details from ancient times, have used the Grimms' tales to explain ancient customs.

One approach sees the topography of European Märchen as echoing the period immediately following the last Ice Age. Other folklorists have explained the figure of the wicked stepmother in a historical/sociological context: many women did die in childbirth, their husbands remarried, and the new stepmothers competed with the children of the first marriage for resources.

In a 2012 lecture, Jack Zipes reads fairy tales as examples of what he calls "childism". He suggests that there are terrible aspects to the tales, which (among other things) have conditioned children to accept mistreatment and even abuse.

== Fairy tales in music ==
Fairy tales have inspired music, namely opera, such as the French Opéra féerie and the German Märchenoper. French examples include Gretry's Zémire et Azor, and Auber's Le cheval de bronze, German operas are Mozart's Die Zauberflöte, Humperdinck's Hänsel und Gretel, Siegfried Wagner's An allem ist Hütchen schuld!, which is based on many fairy tales, and Carl Orff's Die Kluge.

Ballet, too, is fertile ground for bringing fairy tales to life. Igor Stravinsky's first ballet, The Firebird uses elements from various classic Russian tales in that work.

Even contemporary fairy tales have been written for the purpose of inspiration in the music world. "Raven Girl" by Audrey Niffenegger was written to inspire a new dance for the Royal Ballet in London. The song "Singring and the Glass Guitar" by the American band Utopia, recorded for their album "Ra", is called "An Electrified Fairytale". Composed by the four members of the band, Roger Powell, Kasim Sulton, Willie Wilcox and Todd Rundgren, it tells the story of the theft of the Glass Guitar by Evil Forces, which has to be recovered by the four heroes.

== Compilations ==
Authors and works:

=== From many countries ===
- García Carcedo, Pilar (2020): Entre brujas y dragones. Travesía comparativa por los cuentos tradicionales del mundo
- Andrew Lang's Color Fairy Books (1890–1913)
- Wolfram Eberhard (1909–1989)
- Howard Pyle's The Wonder Clock
- Ruth Manning-Sanders (Wales, 1886–1988)
- World Tales (United Kingdom, 1979) by Idries Shah
- Richard Dorson (1916–1981)
- The Annotated Classic Fairy Tales (United States, 2002) by Maria Tatar

=== Italy ===
- Pentamerone (Italy, 1634–1636) by Giambattista Basile
- Giovanni Francesco Straparola (Italy, 16th century)
- Giuseppe Pitrè, Italian collector of folktales from his native Sicily (Italy, 1841–1916)
- Laura Gonzenbach, Swiss collector of Sicilian folk tales (Switzerland, 1842–1878)
- Domenico Comparetti, Italian scholar (Italy, 1835–1927)
- Thomas Frederick Crane, American lawyer (United States, 1844–1927)
- Emma Perodi, Italian writer, author of the Casentinian folk tales (Italy, 1850–1918)
- Luigi Capuana, Italian author of literary fiabe
- Italian Folktales (Italy, 1956) by Italo Calvino

=== France ===
- Charles Perrault (France, 1628–1703)
- Eustache Le Noble, French writer of literary fairy tales (France, 1646–1711)
- Madame d'Aulnoy (France, 1650–1705)
- Emmanuel Cosquin, French collector of Lorraine fairy tales and one of the earliest tale comparativists (France, 1841–1919)
- Paul Sébillot, collector of folktales from Brittany, France (France, 1843–1918)
- François-Marie Luzel, French collector of Brittany folktales (France, 1821–1895)
- Charles Deulin, French author and folklorist (France, 1827–1877)
- Édouard René de Laboulaye, French jurist, poet and publisher of folk tales and literary fairy tales
- Henri Pourrat, French collector of Auvergne folklore (1887–1959)
- Achille Millien, collector of Nivernais folklore (France, 1838–1927)
- Paul Delarue, establisher of the French folktale catalogue (France, 1889–1956)

=== Germany ===
- Grimms' Fairy Tales (Germany, 1812–1857)
- Johann Karl August Musäus, German writer of Volksmärchen der Deutschen (5 volumes; 1782–1786)
- Wilhelm Hauff, German author and novelist
- Heinrich Pröhle, collector of Germanic language folktales
- Franz Xaver von Schönwerth (Germany, 1810–1886)
- Adalbert Kuhn, German philologist and folklorist (Germany, 1812–1881)
- Alfred Cammann (1909–2008), 20th century collector of fairy tales

=== Belgium ===
- Charles Polydore de Mont (Pol de Mont) (Belgium, 1857–1931)

=== United Kingdom and Ireland ===
- Joseph Jacobs's two books of Celtic Fairytales and two books of English Folktales (1854–1916)
- Alan Garner's Book of British Fairy Tales (United Kingdom, 1984) by Alan Garner
- Old English fairy tales by Reverend Sabine Baring-Gould (1895)
- Popular Tales of the West Highlands (Scotland, 1862) by John Francis Campbell
- Jeremiah Curtin, collector of Irish folktales and translator of Slavic fairy tales (Ireland, 1835–1906)
- Patrick Kennedy, Irish educator and folklorist (Ireland, ca. 1801–1873)
- Séamus Ó Duilearga, Irish folklorist (Ireland, 1899–1980)
- Kevin Danaher, Irish folklorist (Ireland, 1913-2002) Folktales from the Irish Countryside
- W. B. Yeats, Irish poet and publisher of Irish folktales
- Peter and the Piskies: Cornish Folk and Fairy Tales (United Kingdom, 1958), by Ruth Manning-Sanders
- Enys Tregarthen, The Piskey-Purse: Legends and Tales of North Cornwall (1905)
- Enys Tregarthen, Legends and Tales of North Cornwall (1906)

=== Scandinavia ===
- Hans Christian Andersen, Danish author of literary fairy tales (Denmark, 1805–1875)
- Helena Nyblom, Swedish author of literary fairy tales (Sweden, 1843–1926)
- Norwegian Folktales (Norway, 1845–1870) by Peter Christen Asbjørnsen and Jørgen Moe
- Svenska folksagor och äfventyr (Sweden, 1844–1849) by Gunnar Olof Hyltén-Cavallius
- August Bondeson, collector of Swedish folktales (1854–1906)
- Jyske Folkeminder by Evald Tang Kristensen (Denmark, 1843–1929)
- Svend Grundtvig, Danish folktale collector (Denmark, 1824–1883)
- Benjamin Thorpe, English scholar of Anglo-Saxon literature and translator of Nordic and Scandinavian folktales (1782–1870)
- Jón Árnason, collector of Icelandic folklore
- Adeline Rittershaus, German philologist and translator of Icelandic folktales

=== Estonia, Finland and Baltic Region ===
- Suomen kansan satuja ja tarinoita (Finland, 1852–1866) by Eero Salmelainen
- August Leskien, German linguist and collector of Baltic folklore (1840–1916)
- William Forsell Kirby, English translator of Finnish folklore and folktales (1844–1912)
- Jonas Basanavičius, collector of Lithuanian folklore (1851–1927)
- Mečislovas Davainis-Silvestraitis, collector of Lithuanian folklore (1849–1919)
- Pēteris Šmits, Latvian ethnographer (1869–1938)

=== Russia ===
- Narodnye russkie skazki (Russia, 1855–1863) by Alexander Afanasyev

=== Czech Republic and Slovakia ===
- Božena Němcová, writer and collector of Czech fairy tales (1820–1862)
- Alfred Waldau, editor and translator of Czech fairy tales
- Jan Karel Hraše, writer and publisher of Czech fairy tales
- František Lazecký, publisher of Silesian fairy tales (Slezské pohádky) (1975–1977)
- Karel Jaromír Erben, poet, folklorist and publisher of Czech folktales (1811–1870)
- August Horislav Škultéty, Slovak writer (1819–1895)
- Pavol Dobšinský, collector of Slovak folktales (1828–1885)
- Albert Wratislaw, collector of Slavic folktales

=== Ukraine ===
- Ivan Franko, Ukrainian poet, novelist, playwright, creator of many Ukrainian folk and fairy tales (1856–1916)
- Yevhen Hrebinka, Ukrainian romantic prose writer and philanthropist, collector of numerous Ukrainian folktales and proverbs (1812–1848)
- Mykhailo Maksymovych, Ukrainian professor, encyclopedist, folklorist and ethnographer (1804–1873)
- Levko Borovykovsky, Ukrainian romantic poet, folklorist and ethnographer, recorder of Ukrainian legends and fairy tales (1806–1889)
- Petro Hulak-Artemovsky, Ukrainian poet and fable writer, including fable-tales (1790–1865)
- Osyp Bodyanskyi, Ukrainian philologist and folklorist, collector of Ukrainian fairy tales (1808-1877)

=== Poland ===
- Oskar Kolberg, Polish ethnographer and composer who compiled several Polish folk and fairy tales (1814–1890)
- Zygmunt Gloger, Polish historian and ethnographer (1845–1910)
- Bolesław Leśmian, Polish poet (1877–1937)
- Kornel Makuszyński, Polish writer of children's literature and tales (1884–1953)

=== Romania ===
- Legende sau basmele românilor (Romania, 1874) by Petre Ispirescu
- Queen Elisabeth of Wied's Romanian fairy tales, penned under nom de plume Carmen Sylva
- Arthur (1814-1875) and Albert Schott (1809-1847), German folklorists and collectors of Romanian fairy tales
- I. C. Fundescu (1836–1904)
- Ion Creangă, Moldavian/Romanian writer, raconteur and schoolteacher (1837-1889)
- Ioan Slavici, Romanian writer and journalist (1848–1925)
- G. Dem. Teodorescu, Wallachian/Romanian folklorist (1849–1900)
- Ion Pop-Reteganul, Romanian folklorist (1853–1905)
- Lazăr Șăineanu, Romanian folklorist (1859–1934)
- Dumitru Stăncescu, Romanian folklorist (1866–1899)

=== Balkan Area and Eastern Europe ===
- Louis Léger, French translator of Slavic fairy tales (France, 1843–1923)
- Johann Georg von Hahn, Austrian diplomat and collector of Albanian and Greek folklore (1811–1869)
- Auguste Dozon, French scholar and diplomat who studied Albanian folklore (1822–1890)
- Robert Elsie, Canadian-born German Albanologist (Canada, 1950–2017)
- Donat Kurti, Albanian franciscan friar, educator, scholar and folklorist (1903–1983)
- Anton Çetta, Albanian folklorist, academic and university professor from Yugoslavia (1920–1995)
- Lucy Garnett, British traveller and folklorist on Turkey and Balkanic folklore (1849–1934)
- Francis Hindes Groome, English scholar of Romani populations (England, 1851–1902)
- Vuk Karadžić, Serbian philologist (Serbia, 1787–1864)
- Elodie Lawton, British writer and translator of Serbian folktales (1825–1908)
- Friedrich Salomon Krauss, collector of South Slavic folklore
- Gašper Križnik (1848–1904), collector of Slovenian folktales

=== Hungary ===
- Elek Benedek, Hungarian journalist and collector of Hungarian folktales
- János Erdélyi, poet, critic, author, philosopher who collected Hungarian folktales
- Gyula Pap, ethographer who contributed to the collection Folk-tales of the Magyars
- The Hungarian Fairy Book, by Nándor Pogány (1913)
- Old Hungarian Fairy Tales (1895), by Countess Emma Orczy and Montague Barstow

=== Spain and Portugal ===
- Fernán Caballero (Cecilia Böhl de Faber) (Spain, 1796–1877)
- Francisco Maspons y Labrós (Spain, 1840–1901)
- Antoni Maria Alcover i Sureda, priest, writer and collector of folktales in Catalan from Mallorca (1862–1932)
- Julio Camarena, Spanish folklorist (1949–2004)
- Teófilo Braga, collector of Portuguese folktales (Portugal, 1843–1924)
- Zófimo Consiglieri Pedroso, Portuguese folklorist (Portugal, 1851–1910)
- Wentworth Webster, collector of Basque folklore
- Elsie Spicer Eells, researcher on Iberian folklore (Portuguese and Brazilian)

=== Armenia ===
- Karekin Servantsians (Garegin Sruandzteants'; Bishop Sirwantzdiants), ethnologue and clergyman; publisher of Hamov-Hotov (1884)
- Hovhannes Tumanyan, Armenian poet and writer who reworked folkloric material into literary fairy tales (1869–1923)

=== Middle East ===
- Antoine Galland, French translator of the Arabian Nights (France, 1646–1715)
- Gaston Maspero, French translator of Egyptian and Middle Eastern folktales (France, 1846–1916)
- Hasan M. El-Shamy, establisher of a catalogue classification of Arab and Middle Eastern folktales
- Amina Shah, British anthologiser of Sufi stories and folk tales (1918–2014)
- Raphael Patai, scholar of Jewish folklore (1910–1996)
- Howard Schwartz, collector and publisher of Jewish folktales (1945–)
- Heda Jason, Israeli folklorist
- Dov Noy, Israeli folklorist (1920–2013)

=== Turkey ===
- Billur Köşk, compilation of Turkish Anatolian stories
- Ignác Kúnos, Hungarian Turkologist and folklorist (1860-1845)
- Pertev Naili Boratav, Turkish folklorist (1907–1998)
- Kaloghlan (Turkey, 1923) by Ziya Gökalp

=== Iran ===
- Arthur Christensen, German Iranist and publisher of Iranian folktales (1875–1945)
- Fazl'ollah Mohtadi Sobhi, Iranian author and publisher of folktales (1897–1962)

=== Indian Subcontinent ===
- Panchatantra (India, 3rd century BC)
- Kathasaritsagara, compilation of Indian folklore made by Somadeva in the 11th century CE
- Madanakamaraja Katha, collection of South Indian folktales
- Burhi Aair Sadhu, collection of Assamese folktales
- Thakurmar Jhuli, collection of Bengali folktales
- Lal Behari Dey, reverend and recorder of Bengali folktales (India, 1824–1892)
- James Hinton Knowles, missionary and collector of Kashmiri folklore
- Maive Stokes, Indian-born British author (1866–1961)
- Joseph Jacobs's book of Indian Fairy Tales (1854–1916)
- Natesa Sastri's collection of Tamil folklore (India) and translation of Madanakamaraja Katha
- Village Folk-Tales of Ceylon, three volumes by H. Parker (1910)
- Pandit Ram Gharib Chaube and British orientalist William Crooke
- Verrier Elwin, ethographer and collector of Indian folk tales (1902–1964)
- A. K. Ramanujan, poet and scholar of Indian literature (1929–1993)
- Santal Folk Tales, three volumes by Paul Olaf Bodding (1925–29)
- Shobhanasundari Mukhopadhyay (1877–1937), Indian author and collector of folktales

=== America ===
- Marius Barbeau, Canadian folklorist (Canada, 1883–1969)
- Geneviève Massignon, scholar and publisher of French Acadian folklore (1921–1966)
- Carmen Roy, Canadian folklorist (1919–2006)
- Joel Chandler Harris's Uncle Remus series of books
- Tales from the Cloud Walking Country, by Marie Campbell
- Ruth Ann Musick, scholar of West Virginian folklore (1897–1974)
- Vance Randolph, folklorist who studied the folklore of the Ozarks (1892–1980)
- Cuentos populares mexicanos (Mexico, 2014) by Fabio Morábito
- Rafael Rivero Oramas, collector of Venezuelan tales. Author of El mundo de Tío Conejo, collection of Tío Tigre and Tío Conejo tales.
- Américo Paredes, author specialized in folklore from Mexico and the Mexican-American border (1915–1999)
- Elsie Clews Parsons, American anthropologist and collector of folktales from Central American countries (New York City, 1875–1941)
- John Alden Mason, American linguist and collector of Porto Rican folklore (1885–1967)
- Aurelio Macedonio Espinosa Sr., scholar of Spanish folklore (1880–1958)

=== Brazil ===
- Monteiro Lobato, Brazilian writer (Brazil, 1882 - 1948)
- Sílvio Romero, Brazilian lawyer and folktale collector (Brazil, 1851–1914)
- Luís da Câmara Cascudo, Brazilian anthropologist and ethnologist (Brazil, 1898–1986)
- Lindolfo Gomes, Brazilian folklorist (1875–1953)
- Marco Haurélio, contemporary writer and folklorist, author of Contos e Fábulas do Brasil and Contos Folclóricos Brasileiros

=== South Korea ===
- Baek Hee-na, author of "The Cloud Bread" (South Korea, 1971–)
- Hwang Seon-mi, author of "Hen out of the yard" (South Korea, 1963–)

=== Africa ===
- Hans Stumme, scholar and collector of North African folklore (1864–1936)
- Sigrid Schmidt, folklorist; known for her voluminous Afrika erzählt ("Africa Narrates") series. The ten volumes are tales (with extensive commentary) collected by the author during 1959-1962 and 1972-1997 (volumes 1 to 7 in German, volumes 8 to 10 in English), mostly in Namibia.

=== Asia ===
- Kunio Yanagita (Japan, 1875–1962)
- Seki Keigo, Japanese folklorist
- Lafcadio Hearn
- Yei Theodora Ozaki, translator of Japanese folk tales (1870–1932)
- Dean Fansler, professor and scholar of Filipino folklore

=== Miscellaneous ===
- Mixed Up Fairy Tales
- Fairy Tales (United States, 1965) by E. E. Cummings
- Fairy Tales, Now First Collected: To Which are Prefixed Two Dissertations: 1. On Pygmies. 2. On Fairies (England, 1831) by Joseph Ritson

== See also ==
- Cuento (Spanish-language fairy tale)
- Duende
- Baba Yaga
- Chupacabra
- Wendigo
- Skinwalker
- Mothman
- Fairy tale parody
- Fairytale Forest
- List of Disney animated films based on fairy tales
- List of fairy tales
- Nursery rhyme
- Incantation
- Folklore, legends and myths in Dombey and Son
