= The Turtle Prince =

Group of South Indian folktales

The Turtle Prince or The Tortoise Prince (āmai rāja katai) refers to a group of South Indian and Sri Lankan folktales in which a prince in turtle form is brought to a human king, marries a human princess, and goes on adventures as part of a wedding quest. Along the way, the turtle prince gains the ability to alternate between turtle and human form, until his wife destroys the turtle shell, keeping him human permanently. The character appears in the compilation Madanakamaraja Katha, a book that collects Tamil folktales.

Scholars like Stith Thompson, Warren Roberts and Stuart Blackburn have related the story and variants to the international cycle of the Animal as Bridegroom, tales wherein a human maiden marries an enchanted husband in animal form.

== Summary ==
=== Madanakamaraja Katha ===
The character features in stories compiled in the work Madanakamaraja Katha.

==== First story ====
Author Natesa Sastri published a translation of Madanakamaraja Katha as The Dravidian Nights Entertainment, which contains two stories about the turtle (tortoise) prince. The first one is the tale from the fourth day, which Sastri translated as Faith Is Always Rewarded, while Dravidologist Kamil Zvelebil translated it as The Tortoise-Prince.

In this tale, King Venkataja, from the city of Mallikârjunapurî, is married to a wife who has not borne him a son. He divorces her, places the former queen in a separate pavilion next to the palace, and marries a second time. The new queen also does not bear him children. The King searches for answers to this problem, and Mahêsvara and the Sûlapânin Isa help him by giving the king a magical mango that he should give to his queen. The king gives the mango to the second queen; she drinks the juice and discards the rest. The first queen's maid hears about the magic mango, finds the discarded seed, and gives it to the first queen. The first queen gives part of the seed to her maid, and they both eat of the magic mango. Consequently, the second queen gives birth to twin boys, the maid to a son, and the first queen to a tortoise. The narrative says that the tortoise son was no ordinary turtle, but a beautiful prince born in Paramêsvara's favour. One night, while spying to find out why food is mysteriously disappearing, the queen sees a human child come out of the tortoise shell; he has been sneaking out of his shell at night and eating rice. When he has gone, she smashes the shell and goes to sleep. When the boy tries to find his shell and sees it destroyed, he wakes his mother. He explains that he needed the shell, and asks her to have a box made to replace the shell. She apologizes for breaking the shell, and consents to his request for a box.

Sometime later, the king instructs his twin sons to travel north, to the mountain Himayagiri ("the frosty mountain"), and bring back the maiden of the mountain to be their father's third wife. Meanwhile, their half-brother, the tortoise prince, using his gift of Jñanâdrishti (a sort of cosmic awareness or omniscience), learns of the quest and knows their endeavor will fail if he does not go with them. He puts some charcoal on his skin to disguise himself and joins the twin princes on their journey. The twin princes do not recognise him as their brother, but think him to be a mountaineer, and they are glad to let him travel with them because he amuses them with stories.

They reach a red-coloured stream and the twin princes drink the water, but the tortoise prince knows that the stream is leftover water from the princess's bath. So he takes his two half-brothers, one in each arm, and leaps from one side of the stream to the other. The princess witnesses this, and having declared that she will marry the man who can cross the stream without stepping in it, she tells her father of the incident and prepares to marry the extraordinary man. The tortoise prince agrees, with the condition that he still wears the black soot at the ceremony. They marry, and the tortoise prince reveals his royal origins to his wife and advises her to go to Himayagiri if he does not return within 28 days.

The tortoise prince (still in his disguise) and the twin princes continue their journey. They come to another city, where a princess has devised a test for suitors: a man at the city entrance gives a pie to travelers and says they must find firewood, leaf, and oil, and return the pie. The tortoise prince deduces the answer and gives the man a sesamum plant (stem for firewood, its leaves as leaves, and its seed for oil). The princess tells her father, and he arranges the wedding the same day. After the wedding, the prince tells his story and tells her to go to Himayagiri if he does not return after an appointed time.

In a third city, a Pândita (learned lady) sets a task for her suitors: she will present a book of her writings on philosophy to the suitor, and he must write a satisfactory comment on it. The black prince succeeds and, with her father's consent, marries the learned lady. After the wedding, he tells her his story, the purpose of his journey, and that she should go to Himayagiri if he does not return within six days. In turn, his third wife tells him how to find the Himayagiri maiden: he should circle around the mountain and touch a certain creeper plant, which will carry him to the princess. Then he should prostrate before her and call her his mother, and inform her that his father wants her for his bride. The tortoise prince arrives at Himayagiri and sees that his two brothers have stopped at its base, uncertain of how to proceed. The prince does everything his third wife has advised, the princess consents to go with him, and they come down the creeper. The prince then realises that he forgot his golden scimitar up on the mountain and goes back to get it. At that moment, his two brothers, jealous of his successes throughout their journey, cut the rope, and he falls to his death.

The twin princes bring the Himayagiri maiden to their father. However, she feels bad about what happened to the tortoise prince, and resolves to make a penance in hopes that he can come back to life. She asks the king to postpone the wedding for six months because she must make a penance (without telling him why), and the king consents and makes the necessary arrangements for her rituals. Meanwhile, the tortoise prince's three wives go to the place where he died and weep over his shattered body. The third wife, the learned lady, knows a way to revive him, so they gather his remains, perform prayer and other rituals, and resurrect him. The quartet visits the home kingdoms of each wife and receive presents and dowries. Then, the prince procures a house a short distance from his town for his wives to wait in, while he goes home to tell his mother of his adventures. The tortoise prince's mother is delighted at seeing her son again, and after hearing his story, goes to meet his wives. She is well-pleased with them, and brings them home to her own palace.

After six months, the Himayagiri maiden wishes to know if the tortoise prince is alive, and devises a way to find out. She asks the king for one last item before her wedding: a golden lotus flower from beyond the seven oceans, saying to her prospective husband that if his twin sons brought her back, surely they can fetch the flower. However, she knows that only the tortoise prince can get the flower.

The twin princes go to the ocean shore and remember, with sorrow and regret, their treachery towards their extraordinary companion. The black prince appears behind them and offers to get the flower, having been informed of their mission by his omniscience, and instructed in how to complete the task by his third wife. He takes seven pebbles and uses each of them to drain the seven oceans; He then reaches the sacred waters called Akhilâdudakoti Brahmânda, chants a summoning command, gives a Rakshasa a note from his third wife, jumps on a crocodile and gets the golden lotus.

The tortoise prince and his half-brothers deliver the flower to the Himayagiri maiden. She finally consents to the wedding and asks the king to send invitations to all the lords of the world and to have the king's first wife, her son, and the son's three wives give her in marriage. The king visits his first wife and is surprised to see the son - his son - and the three princesses, but does not want to appear ignorant, so he conceals his surprise and invites them all to the wedding. On the wedding day, when kings from all parts of the world are assembled, the Himayagiri maiden tells them what she knows of the story of the tortoise prince, of his mother, his father, and his journey. The tortoise prince then tells the part of the story that the princess does not know, of how he obtained the golden lotus. The king embraces the tortoise prince as his son and marries the Himayagiri maiden. The prince forgives his half-brothers' misdeeds, and they all live peacefully.

==== Second story ====
Another tale of the turtle prince from the same compilation is the seventh story, which Sastri translated as True Merit Shall Be Rewarded and Zvelebil as How a prince who was a tortoise married the minister's daughter. In this tale, in the northern city of Amarâvati, king Alakiyasingarâja and his minister Subhamantrî are good friends, and promise to marry their children to each other. In time, the queen gives birth to a tortoise and the minister's wife to a daughter. The king laments for his tortoise son, but the animal prince insists he goes through with the marriage promise. The minister is reluctant to a marriage, but his eldest daughter says she will marry one that brings her the parijata flower, whatever his physical form.

The tortoise prince's father throws him in water and he begins journey, swimming across seven oceans until he reaches Udayagiri, the mountain where the Sun rises every morning, where he salutes the Sun-god, Sûrya-bhagavan, and his charioteer, Aruna, as they begin their daily journey. The Sun questions the presence of the tortoise there, and the prince explains he wishes to know why he was born an animal in this life, chanting 1,008 praises to the deity. The Sun-god replies the tortoise shape is a penance for a misdeed in a previous life, and, at the tortoise's request, blesses him with the ability to assume a human state at will. In human shape, the now human tortoise prince is direct to a sage, then to two other sages. From the third sage, the prince is advised to steal the clothes of the divine maidens (Apsaras) that come to bathe that come to bathe in a pond in the temple, then force her to fetch the parijata flower for him. It happens thus, and the prince convinces the Apsara to help him. She regains her dress and flies back to the divine realm, where she commissions a Vînâ guitar from the divine carpenter, takes a basket full of parijata flowers and dishes, and returns to the prince.

The Apsara and the prince have a meal, and she explains the guitar can summon him and the wonderful dishes. The prince leaves and passes by the sages' houses on the way back. The third sage wishes to have the magic guitar and trades it for a self-attacking club that can decimate armies. As the prince leaves, the club begins to talk and says it wants to beat its previous owner, which the prince lets it do. The third sage is beaten to death. The same event happens to the other two sages: the second sage trades a magic purse for the guitar and the first a pair of teleporting sandals; the prince kills them with the club and retrieves the magic guitar. At last, the prince summons the Apsara and dines with her, explains he will deliver the flower to the minister's daughter and marry her, but he will give the other magical objects to the divine maiden for safekeeping. He assumes his tortoise shape and swims back to his father's kingdom to present the minister's daughter with the flowers.

The minister's daughter receives the flowers and marries the tortoise prince, to her dismay, while her sisters marry human husbands. One night, while his human wife is asleep, the prince crawls to the shore, to the place where the divine maiden hid the objects (a baniyan tree), and commands the club to take off his tortoise shell. He summons the maiden with the guitar and they have a meal. One day, the prince's brothers-in-law decide to go hunting, and the tortoise prince joins with them. The prince rides the lame horse to the banyan tree, takes off the tortoise shell to become human, dons the sandals and the club, and spreads divine ashes over his body. His brothers-in-law see him, mistake him for a god, and dine with him. The prince pretends to bless the pair and asks for the tips of their little fingers in return. It happens thus, and both cut off the tips of their little fingers to give him. On a second hunt, the prince in god-like disguise demands from his brothers-in-law their rings.

Some time later, war breaks out with an enemy army, and the tortoise prince bids his wife prepares him seven tubs of hot water for his return. He rides to the battlefield as a tortoise, doffs the chelonian shell to assume human shape, and defeats the enemy army with the magic club, earning his brothers-in-law's admiration. He returns home as the tortoise and dismisses his wife from his bathtime. However, she spies on his human form and beaks the prince's tortoise shell. The prince leaves the bath and demands the animal shell back, but his wife explains she smashed it to pieces. The prince excuses her and drops onto the bed out of sheer exhaustion. The minister's daughter rushes to her parents to show them the true form of her husband. The king and queen also see their son's human form. The brothers-in-law recognize him as the god-like being they met in the forest. The prince and the minister's daughter remarry and he assumes the throne. Aside its classification as part of the Animal as Bridegroom cycle, folklorists Stith Thompson and Warren Roberts, in their joint work Types of Indic Oral Tales, classified the tale as containing a sequence of tale type 314, "The Youth Transformed to a Horse", in that the lowly hero joins the hunt and marks his brothers-in-law (or demands a piece of them).

== Other tales ==
=== Collected by Henry Parker ===
==== The Turtle Prince (Sri Lanka) ====
Author Henry Parker collected a homonymous tale from Sri Lanka titled The Turtle Prince (Sinhalese: Ibi Kumārayā). In this tale, two noblemen live in two houses in the same city. Their respective wives bear seven children each: one gives birth to seven girls, and the other to six boys and a turtle. Both men decide to have their sons and daughters marry amongst themselves, but there is the problem of the seventh couple: how can a human woman marry a turtle? The nobleman eventually relents and authorizes his daughter's marriage. Sometime later, the king of the same city announces that whoever brings him the Fire Cock (Gini kukulā, or fire[-coloured] cock) from the Land of the Rakshasas shall receive the kingdom. The turtle prince asks his mother to go to the king and offer his services. The turtle prince cooks a bit of rice and starts the journey. On the road, he hides behind some trees and takes off his "turtle jacket". He takes shelter with three old women in his quest for the "Jewelled Cock", and the women all warn him that many have tried and failed in this mission. Since he insists on soldiering on, the widow-mothers teach him magic and give him magic objects to create obstacles for the Rakshasas, should they pursue him after he gets the bird. The prince gets the bird and uses the magical items to hinder the pursuit of Rakshasas. He goes back to the trees, puts the turtle jacket on, and returns to the kingdom with the Fire Cock. Having succeeded, the turtle prince takes off his jacket and goes to hear the Bana with his wife. The wife, noticing the man is her husband, rushes home to burn the turtle jacket and keep her husband in human form permanently. Parker sourced this tale from a tom-tom beater in Hiriyala, North Western Province, Sri Lanka.

==== The Prince who received the Turtle Shell ====
In another tale, The Prince who received the Turtle Shell, in a certain kingdom, the prince's teachers notice that he fails to learn what they teach him, and thus inform the king. His brothers prove to be more skilled than him, and dejected, the prince abandons the kingdom. He takes shelter with a cowherd and his wife. While he grazes the cows, a goddess shows compassion to him and gives him a turtle shell and a magic spell. With it, he can turn into a turtle and vice versa. He goes to another kingdom and becomes the adopted son of a flower mother. He learns the seventh princess is still single and decides to court her in both human and turtle forms. The princess brings the turtle to her palace; he takes off his disguise and tells her his story. With time, she becomes pregnant and the king questions her about it. She tells it is the flower mother's son, so he delivers her to him and banishes her from the palace. Sometime later, the king organizes a feast with a hunt and sends six of his sons-in-law to take part in it. The seventh princess tells her husband and he joins the hunting party in ragged clothes. Out of sight, he changes into a prince, kills the animals, takes their tongues, and returns to his shabby disguise. The brothers-in-law present the animals to the king, but the seventh prince shows up to take the credit for his deed and shows the tongues to the king.

==== Concerning a Royal Princess and a Turtle ====
In another published tale, Concerning a Royal Princess and a Turtle, a king and a minister, due to their deep friendship and trust, promise to betroth their eldest children to each other. The king's wife give birth to a girl, and the minister's wife gives birth to a turtle. The time comes for their wedding vows, and the princess refuses to marry the turtle. However, she says, if they insist on continuing with the marriage, she wants the turtle to first bring her a Sūriya-kāntā flower. The turtle goes to the place where the sun (Surya) rises and places his head on the ground in front of the sun's chariot wheel. Surya gives the turtle the ability to change into a man at will and directs him to the trail of three Dēwatāwās. The Dēwatāwās point to him a hidden lake where "Virgin Women" (Kanniyā-Striyō) or Sun-maidens (Sūriyā-kāntāwō) bathe, and he must steal their clothes and force them to give him the flower. The youth gets the flower and is also given a cudgel and a magic lute. He returns to the turtle shell and marries the princess, while her sisters marry human princes. One day, the six princes go on a seven-day hunt, and the turtle prince, still in turtle form, asks his wife to bring him a mount and a sword. He receives a mule and a short sword and joins his brothers-in-law on the hunt. He hides in the forest, takes off the turtle shell, and summons the Virgin Women to give him a horse and a better sword. The prince, in human shape, hunts the best game for himself. After a while, he meets the six other princes and agrees to give them six dead deer, in exchange for a piece of cloth from each. The turtle prince changes back into a turtle and presents a dead rat as the catch of the day. This goes on for the next few days: the prince exchanges his game for the princes' rings. When the seven-day hunt ends, the turtle prince asks his wife to prepare a hot bath for him; the princess sees him coming out of the shell and burns it. At last, the prince, now fully human, presents his father-in-law with proof that he was the one who hunted the best game for him. Aside its classification as part of the Animal as Bridegroom cycle, folklorists Stith Thompson and Warren Roberts, in their joint work Types of Indic Oral Tales, classified the tale as containing a sequence of tale type 314, "The Youth Transformed to a Horse", in that the lowly hero joins the hunt and marks his brothers-in-law (or demands a piece of them).

=== The Nymph of the Wire Hill ===
In a tale collected by author M. N. Venkataswami with the title The Nymph of the Wire Hill, a king has two wives, but no sons. He goes to the forest and meets an anchorite who directs him to a mango tree. The king takes the mangoes and brings them home to his wives. The younger wife eats the fruits, leaving the peels and cots. The senior wife eats the mango kernels. Months later, the younger wife gives birth to twin sons, and the senior wife to a tortoise.

The senior wife accepts her lot in life and cares for the tortoise as her son. One day, she and a servant notice that some food has been disappearing from their palace. It turns out that her tortoise son is indeed human, for he leaves the tortoiseshell in human form, eats the food, and goes to Davendraloka to learn, just as his half-brothers are learning from a pandit. The senior wife discovers the empty shell, notices her son is human after all, and smashes it. Losing his turtle shell, he asks his mother to fashion him a box to cover himself with.

Sometime later, the king becomes ill with longing for the "Nymph of the Wire Hill", and his sons decide to bring her to their father to be his next wife. The tortoise son, now human, tells his mother he must join his brothers since they cannot get the Nymph by themselves. His mother applies some colirium to his face and his appearance darkens, so his brothers cannot recognize him.

He joins his brothers and they begin their quest. Their first stop is a kingdom whose princess has declared she will marry the one who can jump across a large stream. The first princess tells her father she will marry the dark boy who accompanies the twin princes. He tells he is only an ascetic without much to his name. They marry and the prince spends some time with his wife, asking her how to get to Wire Hill. Before he departs, he gives her a Mangalasustram flower as a token of life.

Their next stop is another kingdom, where a princess has issued a challenge: who can bring her all the necessary provisions for life in a pie? The tortoise prince goes to the bazaar, buys a unit of all grains in a bundle, and produces some ghi on a leaf and a faggot of wood. The second princess marries the man who brought the provisions, which are the correct answer to her riddle. Before he departs, he gives the princess a flower a token of life.

The prince's third stop is another kingdom, where their princess has issued a proclamation that she will marry anyone who can decipher a drawing of the Devendraloka with some inscriptions underneath. The tortoise prince deciphers the drawing and the inscriptions and marries for the third time. While talking to his new wife, she tells him that the on the southern part of Wire Hill there is a wire that he can use to reach the Nymph. Before he departs, he plants a lily as a token of life and instructs her to go to Wire Hill in case the flower blackens.

At last, the three princes arrive at Wire Hill. The twin princes complain to each other about their companion's marital successes and plot against him. The tortoise prince climbs the wire and meets the Nymph. After spending some time with him, the Nymph climbs down the wire but asks the youth to bring her her parrot cage. The tortoise prince descends the wire with the bird cage, but the twin princes cut the wire and he falls to his death.

Each of the princesses notices that the token of life changes color and runs to Wire Hill, the first princess meeting the second and both meeting the third one. The trio reach Wire Hill and see the tortoise prince's bones scattered, and the wives gather up the bones. The youngest wife goes to a cistern, bathes seven times, and enters a meditation state, extending the folds of her garments to receive something. Parwati heeds her lamentations and Parmeshwara gives her a rod to use on the tortoise prince to revive him. The youngest princess uses the rod on her husband and returns it to the cistern.

The tortoise prince, now revived, takes his three wives, passes by each of their kingdoms to gather presents and amass a large retinue, and returns to his kingdom. He asks his three wives to meet and greet his mother, bathe her feet, and offer her a seat.

Meanwhile, the twin princes get the credit for bringing the Nymph of Wire Hill to their father. Still thinking of the youth who came to her at Wire Hill, she tells her husband-to-be, the king, that before their wedding she needs some Cobra-Lillies, found only at the end of seven and seven-fourteen seas, beyond the sea of milk. The tortoise prince notices his brothers are being sent for the Cobra-Lillies, and asks his third and youngest wife for advice. She gives him a letter and some seeds and explains what to do: he is to cast the seeds into the sea, which will open a dry passage for him; he is to walk all the way until he sees a turtle; he is to give the turtle the letter; the turtle will return and take him to its king, the Lord of Serpents.

The tortoise prince follows his third wife's instructions and finds the turtle, giving it the letter. The turtle takes the prince to the court of the Lord of Serpents, who greets him. He marries him to his daughter, the "celestial Swain", gives him some Cobra-Lillies, and sends both his daughter and son-in-law back on the turtle. The twin princes arrive on the beach and see the tortoise prince and his new wife coming. The prince agrees to give them the Cobra-Lillies.

Seeing that the task is fulfilled, the Nymph of Wire Hill agrees to set a date for her marriage with to the king and invites a grand assembly of nobles and monarchs. However, she notices the absence of the senior wife and her son. The king takes issue with this information, since, in his mind, only his younger wife bore him any sons. The Nymph of Wire Hill scolds her fiancé and tells him that his twin sons did nothing heroic, and the tortoise prince did everything. The king spits at the twin sons and banishes them, and embraces his senior wife, their tortoise son, and the tortoise's four wives. Venkataswami classified the tale as a "Tortoise Prince Type", and, according to his preface, the tale was provided by his cousin named M. Venkatamma, from Bezwada.

=== The Turtle Prince (Kannada) ===
Indian scholar A. K. Ramanujan collected and published a tale from Kannada with the title The Turtle Prince. In this tale, a king and his minister have no children, so they consult a holy man, who tells them that if devote themselves to Siva, their wives will become pregnant. Thus, both men agree to wed their children to each other. In time, the queen gives birth to a turtle and the minister's wife to a girl. Years later, the king worries about marrying the turtle son to the minister's daughter, so, bid by his animal son, consults with the minister and his daughter. The girl says she will marry the man who can bring her the celestial parijata flower.

With some help from his father, the turtle prince begins his journey and swims to Udaya mountain, where he prays to the sun god. The deity himself appears before him, explains that the prince's animal shape is penance for a misdeed in a past life, and transforms him into a handsome human prince. Continuing on his journey, the prince, now in human form, meets three sages on the way and is guided to the temple of the elephant-faced god, where celestial maidens come down to earth to bathe, so the prince should steal one of the girls' saris and force her to help him to find the parijata flowers that grow in the celestial realm. It happens thus and the celestial maiden brings back the flowers. She also gives the prince a flute that can summon her. The prince makes his way back to the sages, who each want the magic flute in exchange for a gift they have: the first a wand that can beat one's enemies, the second a sack that grants the owner whatever they wish for, and the third a pair of teleporting sandals. The prince trades the flute for each, commands the wand to beat up the sages, and retrieves the flute.

The prince returns to his kingdom, hides the magical items and prays to the Sun God to become a turtle again. Since he fulfilled the minister's daughter's request, he marries the girl, while her younger sisters marry human princes. Some time later, the princes go on a hunt, and the tortoise wishes to join them. The turtle's wife, who knows of the mockery she endures, prepares him for the hunt. Out of sight, the turtle takes off his shell and becomes human, then fights some tigers. His brothers-in-law meet the prince ("they saw the turtle"), who do not recognize him. The human turtle prince agrees to a deal: the tigers in exchange for the left half of their mustaches. A deal is made, and the prince returns to turtle form.

Later that night, while the minister's daughter is asleep, the prince takes off his shell, undresses his wife, caresses her body, and goes back to being a turtle. The next morning, she notices that someone came in the night, and decides to investigate. The next night, his wife discovers his human form and wants his charade to end. The next morning, the brothers-in-law go to court to take the credit for killing the tigers, but the turtle appears, takes off the shell, and becomes a man. He reveals he is the one responsible for the deed and shows the mustaches as proof. He is then crowned king. Professors Stuart Blackburn and Alan Dundes, editors of Ramanujan's book, classified the tale as the following tale types: an approximation to type AT 433B, "King Lindworm"; AT 465A, "The Quest for the Unknown"; and AT 569, "The Knapsack, the Hat, and the Horn".

=== Beauty and the Beast (Kadar) ===
Zacharias P. Thundy collected and published a tale from the Kadar people that he titled Beauty and the Beast. In this tale, a king and his minister are friends and are childless. They find a miracle-working holy man who advises them to pluck a certain mango in a tree and give it to their respective wives. It happens thus, and the king's wife eats the right side, while the minister's wife eats the left side. Their wives become pregnant, and the king and the minister promise to marry their children to each other. In time, a turtle is born to the king and a girl to the minister. The king and the queen pray for their son to have a transformation. Eventually, the minister's daughter reaches marriageable age, and is courted by many suitors. However, she announces she will only marry the one who brings her the celestial flower of parijata flower. The turtle prince asks his parents to tie him to a horse, and he rides to meet Lord Siva, who is called "the Sun-God". The turtle prince prays to him, and is given the ability to remove his shell. Lord Siva also points the now human turtle prince to seek the seven sages that are located on the way to heaven. The prince passes by them and reaches a pond where seven celestials damsels come to bathe. He steals the clothes of the seventh one and asks her to take him to heaven so he can pluck the parijata flower. It happens thus, but his human presence in heaven annoys the deities and they send him back. As a parting gift, the celestial damsel gives him a magic box. The turtle prince gains the music box and trades it for other items with the seven sages, but kills them all and steals the sages' treasures (a magic cub and magic cords from the seventh sage, a magic dish that produces food from the sixth, a necklace from the fifth, magic ring from the fourth, money and pumpkin from the third, a magic sword from the second, and a veena from the first). The prince returns to his turtle shell and delivers the parijata flower to the minister's daughter. She relents and marries the turtle-shaped prince. Unbeknownst to his wife, the turtle prince removes his turtle disguise to sleep and to bathe. One day, a servant spies through the door the prince's golden human form and tells the minister's daughter. She also spies on him and discovers her husband's true form, then burns the turtle shell. The prince dons clothes in human form and goes to meet his parents, and they celebrate an official wedding for the prince and his wife.

=== Collected by Stuart Blackburn ===
==== The Turtle Prince (Kovalam) ====
Stuart Blackburn collected an oral tale from a male informant named Devasahayam Pillai, from Kovalam, in 1978. In this tale, two pregnant women, Ammaravathi and Puthuval, go to a well to draw water and make a pledge to marry their children to each other, if one bears a boy and the other a girl, and vice-versa, then go back to their houses. At the end of their pregnancies, Ammaravathi gives birth to a turtle son, while Puthuval to a girl. People flock to the newborn girl's house as part of the seventh-month feeding ceremony, and no one visits the turtle and his mother. The turtle son lives in the gutters, but returns home to be fed by his mother. As time passes, the girl's marriage is arranged, and the turtle son asks his mother to be taken there in a basket. Despite his mother's protests that no one would marry a turtle and that he would die, the woman takes the turtle to the ceremony. During the ceremony, the turtle goes to the area where the wedding couple are and interrupts the wedding to recall about the pledge their mothers made by the well, the turtle's and the girl's. Puthuval admits to the pledge, but refuses to marry her daughter to a turtle. Her daughter says she will toss a garland to a person and marry whoever it lands on. The girl throws the garland and it falls on the turtle, so she redoes her action and it still falls on the turtle three times, marking the animal as her husband. The turtle marries her and takes her home with him, but still lies in the gutter. His mother scolds him for bringing home a beautiful wife and not doing anything with her. The turtle son retorts that he will bring home more beautiful wives. The turtle son learns that Selva Raja has two princesses that are struck with a fatal disease, prays to god to become human, and goes to heal them. On the road, the turtle prince takes the form of an old man and talks to a drum beater about the princesses' situation, promising to heal them and asking to be ferried to the raja on a cart. The old man tells the raja he can cure the princesses, but asks to be given them in marriage in return. He rolls his body dirty in three balls, dips them in water and gives them to the princesses. The raja is happy his daughters are safe, but despairs at the idea of marrying them to an old man. The old man reminds him that his promise (marry the girls to whoever cured them, be it Palan, Paraiyan or whoever) was written on a copper pot, and the king relents. The turtle prince returns home with two new wives and still resumes his chelonian form and does not "speak" with any of his wives (which Blackburn explains is an euphemism in Tamil for sexual contact).

Lastly, the turtle son goes to find new brides for himself, dons the disguise of a handsome youth and goes to talk to a Chola raja, whose daughter is infected with smallpox. The turtle prince, in the new disguise, cures the princess, and Chola raja promises to marry her to the youth, if he goes to a certain pool, fetch a certain box, take out the knife inside and sacrifice the golden cock, then take the two necklaces inside the bird and bring them back. The youth promises to do it, assumes an ascetic disguise, then goes to talk to the daughter of Icakki, a goddess. The girl helps the disguised turtle prince and asks her mother not to devour him. The turtle prince kills the cock and returns to Chola raja with the necklaces, then marries another princess. Back home, the turtle prince asks his father-in-law to arrange for a drama which people are to attend, which the man agrees to do after some initial reluctance and fear that there will be some confusion. The turtle prince, in turtle form, asks his seven wives to prepare the rice and attend the celebration, for he will stay home. After the septet leaves to the drama, the turtle son prays to Muttu Kutti, his protector, to assume human form, and a horse comes from the heavens to his side. The turtle son, in human form, rides the horse to the festival and clears out space in the crowd for his seven wives, to the latter's admiration. During the drama, a rock is thrown, there is a fight in the crowd with knives and blades, and the turtle prince returns home ahead of his seven wives, then pretends to be interested in the things the girls saw at the festival. He then convinces the raja to arrange another drama, which he attends in the human disguise on the horse. Like the raja predicted, there is a fight on the second drama, and on the subsequent dramas, up to the seventh. The turtle prince retires to his house with his wives and asks them to prepare him a bath. He removes his shell to take a bath in human form. The co-wives learn of their common husband's true form, steal the shell and decide to burn it to make him human permanently. The turtle son, now human, leaves the bath and cannot find the turtle shell, so he asks his co-wives about it, but they feign ignorance. The seven girls then confront the man that he is not a turtle, but a raja, a man, and has not fulfilled his marital duties. The first wife comes forward and questions him that she has not become pregnant. The now human turtle son prays to god and she becomes pregnant.

==== The Turtle Prince (Tamil) ====
Stuart Blackburn collected a Tamil tale from a male informant named Sivalingam, in the 1990s, which he titled The Turtle Prince. In this tale, raja and a minister promise to marry their children. When a turtle is born to the raja and six girls to the minister, the eldest daughter asks for her turtle suitor to get her a parijatam flower. The turtle prince goes to the sun god Surya, who grants him a boon: he can transform into human form and hold the turtle shell in his hand. With the directions of an ascetic, he steals the garments of a Kannimar to convince her to get him the flower. The Kannimar gives him the flower, and a vina in case he wants to summon her help anywhere. He also obtains a magic wand (baton), a magic bag and magic sandals. Assuming turtle form again, he returns home and marries the minister's eldest daughter. One day, he asks for a blind helper and a lame horse as a mount to join his brothers-in-law in the hunt. Later, he defends his father's kingdom against a foreign army, and, when he goes home to bathe, his wife takes the turtle shell and burns it.

=== The Turtle ===
In a South Indian tale from Karavali Uttara Kannada with the title "ಆಮೆ" ("The Turtle"), a king has a son in the shape of a turtle. One day, the turtle prince courts a neighbouring king's daughter, but she asks him to find her a certain flower named Kenda Sampi, which lies beyond seven seas. The turtle prince crosses the sea and finds a sage that gives him a jar, which can be used to summon a house and angels to provide him with food. The turtle prince fetches the flower and meets some sages on the road: the first one trades the jar for a magical stick that beats on command of its owner. The turtle prince returns home and gives the princess the flower. For her promise, she marries the turtle. However, one day, she spies on her chelonian husband taking a shower: he is human under the turtle shell. Some time later, the princess's elder sisters' husbands go on a hunt, and the turtle husband wishes to join them. The princess ties the turtle on a horse for him to join the hunt. In the forest, the turtle prince summons a house with the jar, removes the turtle shell and assumes human form, then commands a magical stick to gather all animals around him, and him only. It happens thus. The human brothers-in-law have no luck in finding any game, when they find the mysterious man (the turtle prince in human form), whom they do not recognize and ask for some animals. The human turtle prince makes a deal: some meat for allowing the prince to write a mark on their thighs. Later, war breaks out with another kingdom, and the turtle prince joins in the fray by removing his turtle shell. He meets his brothers-in-law and asks for a signet ring and a sword as payment, while he goes to defeat the enemies. The princess's father sends for his three sons-in-law to congratulate them for their "effort", when the human turtle prince appears to them and reveals their deceit by showing the signet ring and the sword and pointing to the marks on their thighs. At the end of the tale, while the human turtle prince is in the bath, the princess tells her father her chelonian husband is human, after all, and burns his turtle shell to keep him human.

=== Pomegranate Prince (Tulu Nadu) ===
In a South Indian tale from Tulu Nadu with the title "ದಾಳಿಂಬೆ ಕುಮಾರ" ("Pomegranate Prince"), in a kingdom the king and the prime-minister are childless, and make devotions and pilgrimages for the gods for a blessing. One day, an astrologer comes and predicts both rulers will have children, and they arrange a future marriage between their scions: if the prime minister's child is a boy, he will let him marry the princess; if a girl, she will marry the prince. However, the prime minister wants his son to inherit the throne, so he goes to the Ganges to bathe and is granted a blessing from deity Vishwanath: a pomegranate to be eaten by their respective wives. The prime minister presents his wife with the fruit, and goes to deal with his some matters. While her husband is away, the prime minister's wife eats the seeds and leaves the peels. The prime minister learns of this and tells the king. Despite the mistake, the queen gulps the peels with a drink and both women become pregnant. In time, the prime minister's wife gives birth to a girl, and the queen to a son that is covered in pomegranate peels, his head, hands and feet the only visible parts of his body, which reminds people of a turtle. For this, he is called Dalimbe Kumar ("Pomegranate Prince"). After a while, the prince asks to marry the prime minister's daughter, but she sets a condition for him first: fetch flowers from the prime minister's sister-in-law Atti Hu. Dalambe Kumar crawls to a magician's hut, who directs him this guru's ashram. The prince is instructed to go to a certain lake where the Sirikanyas (Yakshinis) play and sport in the water, steal the sáris of one of them and ask her to fetch the flowers. The prince spies on the maidens, steals the sari and crawls up a tree. One of the maidens notices her missing garments, finds the prince and offers a trade: the garments in exchange for her help in getting the flowers. The Sirikanya transports the prince to Sirilok, fetches a basket of jasmine flowers and returns to the lake. The maiden gives the prince a harp to summon her, since she has fallen in love with him, and removes his pomegranate peel skin, turning him into a handsome prince. The human prince asks her to put the husk again, but this time he can alternate between both states. On the road back, the prince trades the harp for the guru's magic sword, whom he kills by commanding the sword, and gains a lute from the magician, whom he also kills with the sword. The prince returns to his kingdom with the flowers and marries the prime minister's daughter. Some time after the wedding, a neighbouring king attacks the prince's kingdom and captures the king and the prime minister. Dalimbe Kumar removes his peely disguise, dons a heavy armour and kills the enemy army with the magic sword, releasing his father and father-in-law. At the end of the tale, the prince takes a bath in human form. His wife spies on him then burns the fruit peel disguise to keep him human.

=== Wedding of a Tortoise ===
In a tale collected from Tulu Nadu with the title Oñji Ēmeda Madme and translated as Wedding of a Tortoise, a king is childless and worries for not having heirs. One day, he goes on a journey to ascetics in search of an answer, and finds a tortoise trapped in land which he throws back in the water. He meets the ascetic and asks for a boon. The ascetic asks the king what virtuous work he did that would grant him a boon, and the monarch mentions the tortoise he helped, so the ascetic sends him on his way, saying that the king's prayers will be answered. Thus, a tortoise is born to the queen, to the endless mockery of the people. Still, the monarchs rear it to adolescence, until the day the queen asks the king to find the tortoise prince a bride. He sends emissaries to ask for a bride, but many reject him. Eventually, another king with four daughters takes the proposal, and his youngest daughter agrees to marry the tortoise prince, but he must quest for the red champak flower beyond seven seas. The tortoise-prince's parents say that their son cannot do so, thus is unable to have a wife, so he decides to go on the quest for the flower. Out of sight, he removes his carapace to become a handsome youth, then goes to the ascetic for directions. The now human prince reaches a kingdom ruled by women and steals the garments of four bathing ladies in return for their help in getting the flowers. They strike a deal, and the ladies bring back the red champak flowers and gift the prince with a vina, a stringed musical instrument, to summon them. The prince makes his way back to the ascetic and plays the vina to show him its powers, and orders the ladies to tie him and retrieve the veena for him. The same happens to two other ascetics, who try to steal the veena in exchange for other magical objects: a magic stick and a magic sword. The prince kills the two other ascetics with the stick and the sword and retrieves the veena. The prince then dons the carapace and returns with the flowers to the princess. The princess marries the tortoise-prince. After their marriage, the princess is advised to prepare her husband a bath and hide to see how he takes his bath. She does as instructed and hides in a pile of dry leaves used for fuel, and watches as the tortoise removes his carapace to become human and enter the water. The princess then comes out of hiding and throws the carapace in the fire, making him human for good.

== Analysis ==
=== Tale type ===
Folklorists Stith Thompson and Warren Roberts established an index for South Asian folktales based on the international Aarne-Thompson Index. In their joint work, titled Types of Indic Oral Tales, they identified an Indic type related to the cycle of the Animal as Bridegroom, which they indexed as type 441, "Hans My Hedgehog", a miscellaneous type that, while still belonging to the same cycle and dealing with the marriage between a human maiden and an enchanted animal, lacks the quest for the vanished or missing husband.

Stuart Blackburn also related the South Indian tales about "The Turtle Prince" to the cycle of the Animal as Bridegroom, but formulated a new Indic type, based on the variants he collected (at least 18 texts): AT 441B Ind, "The Despised Animal-Husband". (Note: The abbreviation "Ind" means "Indic". It refers to tale types that, although not registered in the Aarne-Thompson-Uther international index, exist in the oral and written literature of these three South Asian countries: India, Pakistan and Sri Lanka.) In this new tale type, the animal husband is born to a woman who pledged to marry her unborn child to another woman's child if a girl, but the second woman reneges on the promise since a turtle is born; the despised turtle prince removes his chelonian disguise to assume human form and perform deeds in order to gain the princess's favour (obtaining objects or a lotus flower); the animal prince also prevails over his brothers or brothers-in-law on a hunt or a quest; finally, he reenters his animal disguise and joins with his wife, but she destroys the turtle shell when her husband is bathing.

=== Distribution ===
In a 2001 study, Blackburn stated that these stories were "very popular" South Indian tales. In addition, he developed his new Indian tale type based mostly on oral and written variants of The Turtle Prince, collected from Tamil Nadu, Tamil-speaking areas in Sri Lanka, and in Karnataka. He also drew from the literary text Madanakama Raja, and considered that the literary tales followed the oral versions "in many details". Based on the distribution of the tales about the turtle-prince, Blackburn supposed that this new tale type was of Dravidian origin, since most of texts (literary and oral) were collected from languages of the Dravidian family.

=== Motifs ===
==== The turtle prince ====
The tales contain motif T554.5, "Woman bears tortoise (turtle)", motif D193, "Transformation: man to tortoise (turtle)", B604.2, "Marriage to tortoise" and B604.2.1, "Marriage to turtle".

According to scholarship, the Tortoise Prince appears in Tamil folklore. In a version of the tale, he is born after his mother swallows the pit of a mango.

==== Branding the brothers-in-law ====
According to German scholars Günther Damman and Kurt Ranke, a motif that appears in tale type ATU 314 is the hero branding his brothers-in-law during their hunt. Likewise, Ranke stated that the hero's branding represented a mark of his ownership over his brothers-in-law.

=== Interpretation ===
Stuart Blackburn interpreted the Turtle Prince tales of India as male-centered, in comparison to the European tales of the animal bridegroom: in female-centered tales, the heroine burns the husband's animal skin, causing their separation and her search for him, while in male-centered tales, burning the animal skin restores the animal husband to human form. In addition, while in tale type AT 425 and 433, the animal groom appears as fierce animals like wolves and bears, in Europe, and snakes and tigers in India, in type 441 the hero appears as a despised animal, like a hedgehog in the Grimm's tale, or a turtle or a crab in India. In this light, due to being a lowly animal, the hero is despised by potential brides and his relatives-in-law, and has adventures later in life to prove himself - a narrative that underscores male anxieties regarding their role in life.

== See also ==
- Tulisa, the Wood-Cutter's Daughter
- The Snake Prince
- Princess Himal and Nagaray
- The Pretty Little Calf (Chinese folktale; prince as bull or calf)

=== Water animals as husbands ===
- Eglė the Queen of Serpents
- The Frog Prince
- The Golden Crab
- The Little Crab (Greek folktale)
- Prince Crawfish (Belarusian folktale)
- Sang Thong (Thai folktale; prince as snail)
- The Snail Son (Japanese folktale)
- Muchie-Lal
