= Madanakamaraja Katha =

Collection of South Indian folktales

Madanakamaraja Katha is a collection of South Indian folktales. It goes by several similar names, such as Madanakamarajan Kathai in Tamil and Madana Kamaraju Kathalu in Telugu.

It collects stories told in South India, some of which are also found in Sri Lanka.

The frame story, like that of the Arabian Nights, involves the narration of stories to gain time. The prince Madanakāmarāja falls in love with two women he sees in a painting. He instructs his friend, a minister's son, to find them both and bring them to him, after which he will choose and marry one, and the minister can marry the other. The friend sets off, finds the two women, and starts bringing them home. As he does not know which of them will be his wife, he manages to keep them off by narrating them the several stories that make up the collection.

== Publication ==
The Tamil text was published in 1848 and 1855 and translated by S. M. Natesa Sastri as "Dravidian Nights" in 1886. The translation contains twelve stories in all.

Author V. A. K. Ayer also translated the compilation as Stories of King Madana Kama, published in 1962.

Dravidologist Kamil Zvelebil provided another English language translation with the title The Story of King Mataṉakāma.

== Legacy ==
Although it was important as a collection of folktales, it did not have much effect on Tamil literary culture. The 1941 film Madanakamarajan was broadly based on this work.

== See also ==
- The Turtle Prince (folktale) (South Indian folktale)
