= Enys Tregarthen =

Cornish author and folklorist

Nellie Sloggett (29 December 1850 in Padstow, Cornwall, UK – 1923) was an author and folklorist who wrote under the names Enys Tregarthen and Nellie Cornwall.

Nellie Cornwall (1910) Tamsin Rosewarne and her Burdens

== Life and work ==
Nellie Sloggett was born at the end of 1850; not as sometimes stated 1851. She was raised mainly by her mother, Sarah Sloggett, in Padstow; her father, Moses, worked at sea and died when Nellie was just six.

At 17 Nellie developed a spinal illness and was paralysed for the rest of her life. She started studying and writing and this practice eventually led to the publication of her first book, Daddy Longlegs, and His White Heath Flower, in 1885, under the pen-name 'Nellie Cornwall'. Of fifteen Cornwall books which would come out between 1885 and 1909: 'two are set in London, nine in Cornwall, one in an unnamed part of provincial England, and... three in Norway'. 'The Cornwall books, despite their changed settings, are similar in their essentials. They were written primarily for adolescents... They belong very much to the ‘evangelical tradition’... Many are what could be described as ‘waif’ novels, where children are neglected or inadequately protected and must fend for themselves, until God steps in.'

In her fifties Nellie came to devote much of her attention to Cornish folklore and legend. She collected and recorded many stories about the Piskey folk, fairies of Cornish myth and legend. She published her most celebrated works in this category under her better-known pen-name of Enys Tregarthen. After Tregarthen's death, the writer Elizabeth Yates edited her extensive unpublished materials for publication: three books emerged in the 1940s under Yates' custodianship.

== Works ==
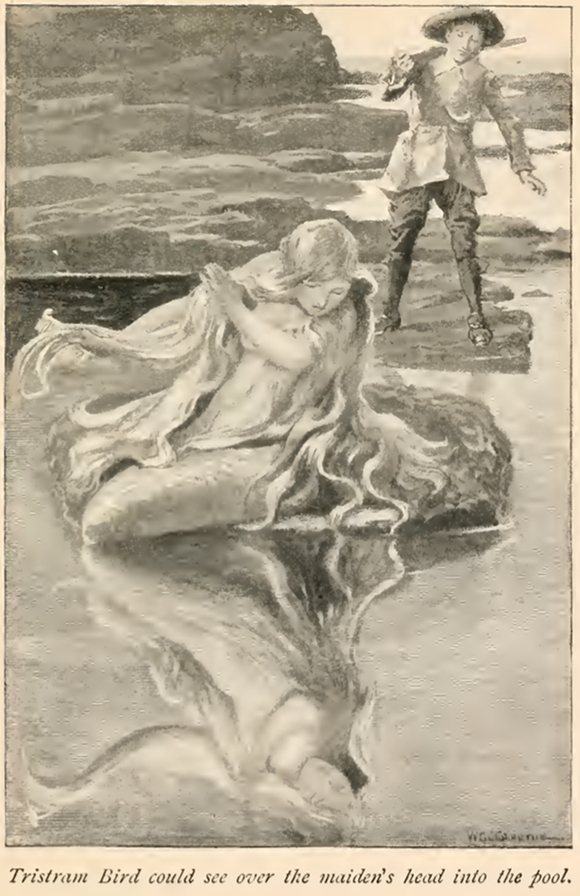
Tristram Bird and the Mermaid of Padstow, from Enys Tregarthen's North Cornwall Fairies and Legends

=== As Nellie Cornwall ===
- Daddy Longlegs and His White Heath Flower (1885)
- Granny Tresawna's Story (1886)
- Hallvard Halvorsen; or the Avalanche. A Story of the Fjeld, Fjord and Fos (1887)
- Twice Rescued or the Story of Little Tino (1888)
- Faithful Rigmor and Her Grandmother (1888)
- Mad Margrete and Little Gunnvald: A Norwegian Tale (1889)
- Sprattie and the Dwarf or The Shining Stairway (1891)
- Tamsin Rosewarne and Her Burdens (1892)
- Little Bunch’s Charge or True to Trust (1894)
- Joyce's Little Maid (1896)
- Little Annie (1897) Academia
- The Maid of the Storm (1900)
- The Hill of Fire (1901)
- The Little Don of Oxford (1902)
- Little Gladwise: the Story of a Waif (1909)

=== As Enys Tregarthen ===
- The Doll Who Came Alive (1942) ISBN 0-381-99683-2
- Pixie Folklore & Legends (reprinted 1995) ISBN 0-517-14903-6
- Padstow's Faery Folk (paperback)
- North Cornwall Fairies and Legends. London: Wells Gardner, Darton & Co. 1906 – via Internet Archive.
- The House of the Sleeping Winds and Other Stories (1911)
- The White Ring (1949)
