= Carmen Roy =

Canadian ethnologist, folklorist, and museum curator (1919–2006)

- Born: December 25, 1919; Bonaventure, Quebec
- Died: April 9, 2006 (aged 86); Ottawa Ontario
- Occupation(s): folklorist, ethnographer, museum curator
- Years active: 1948–1984
- Known for: oral tradition and folklore in Gaspésie

Carmen Roy was an ethnologist and folklorist who conducted an oral survey in the Gaspé Peninsula and served in many roles as curator and section director at Canada's National Museum in Ottawa in the late 1940s through to the 1980s. Working with Marius Barbeau and Luc Lacouciere, she helped build and modernize ethnographic practice in Canada and was considered an early leader in the field of folklore in the country. As an administrator at the National Museum she also helped foster the scholarship of collectors such as Helen Creighton and Edith Fowke.

== Early life and education ==
Roy grew up in Cap-Chat on the Gaspé Peninsula, where she published poetry under the pseudonym "Mousse Des Bois." She would later attend Collège Marguerite-Bourgeoys in Montreal where she completed her baccalauréat en Lettres in 1942. She then went on to study French at the Université Laval. It was there in Quebec city where she encountered Marius Barbeau in 1947 who sparked her interest in folklore. At his recommendation she secured a position at the National Museum of Canada. With the help of scholarships, she would later complete a doctorate in ethnography at the Sorbonne in 1953, under the supervision of Marcel Griaule, her thesis titled "Littérature orale en Gaspesis." Her jury included Charles Bruneau and Henri-Irénée Marrou. Some speculate she was one of the first women from the peninsula to obtain a doctorate degree.

== Career ==
As a specialist in French-Canadian and Acadian folklore, Roy worked as a curator at Canada's National Museum in Ottawa from 1948 to 1956. From 1948 to 1952 she coordinated a massive oral survey of the Gaspe Peninsula, collecting testimonies and data that would serve as the foundation of modern linguistic and ethnographic enquiry in the region for not only her own doctoral work, but other scholars working in linguistics and folklore studies. In 1957 when the National Museum established a folklore division, Roy became its director. In 1966 the Division of Anthropology was divided into an Ethnography and a Folklore Division, Roy became the director of the Folklore team. In 1970 the Canadian Centre for Folk Culture Studies was founded at the museum with Roy at its head. Although deeply passionate about the Gaspé and Maritime provinces, Roy applied herself to learning more about the Canadian West and encouraged collecting and study in more diverse communities. Under her direction, the Centre embraced federal policies of multiculturalism. By 1977 Roy held the position of Senior Scientist-Folk Culture at the now renamed National Museum of Man. She retired in 1984 but continued to work from the museum until 1992.

Roy's approach to the research and study of folklore has been characterized as "more professional, bureaucratic attitude" in comparison to her contemporaries like Helen Creighton, and she advocated for folklore studies to be treated as an emerging discipline in the social sciences. In an interview in 1968 she characterized folklore as something that changes and is replaced and should be "studied with an eye to sociology and history." She implemented a multidisciplinary approach to folklore studies in her leadership roles at the Folklore Division and expanded the scope to reflect the demographic realities of Canadian society the foundations of the Canadian mosaic.

== Selected publications ==
- Roy, Carmen. Saint-Pierre et Miquelon : une mission folklorique aux îles. 1966
- Roy, Carmen. Les Acadiens de la rive nord du fleuve Saint-Laurent. Ottawa: Queens Printer. 1963.
- Collection de chansons recueillies à la Baie Sainte-Marie : par Carmen Roy et Maguy Andral au cours des années 1959 e t 1962.
- Roy, Carmen. Contes populaires gaspésiens. Montreal: Fides. 1956.
- Roy, Carmen. La pêche en Gaspésie (technologie et terminologie). Ottawa: 1956
- Roy, Carmen. Le géant Brigandin. Montreal: Fides. 1956?
- Roy, Carmen. La Littérature Orale en Gaspésie. Ottawa: 1955.

== Awards ==
- Folkloriste canadien ou canadienne de distinction, Folklore Studies Association of Canada (1982)
- Public Service Award for 25 years of service (1979)
- Queen Elizabeth II Silver Jubilee Medal (1977)
- Canadian Centennial Medal (1967)
