= Gyula Pap (ethnographer) =

Hungarian ethnographer (1813–1870)

- Occupation: Writer
- Writing career
- Period: 19th century
- Genre: Folktale

Gyula Pap (1813–1870) was an ethnographer and writer of Hungarian folk tales, most notably The Folk-Tales of the Magyars.
