= Natesa Sastri =

Tamil writer and folklorist

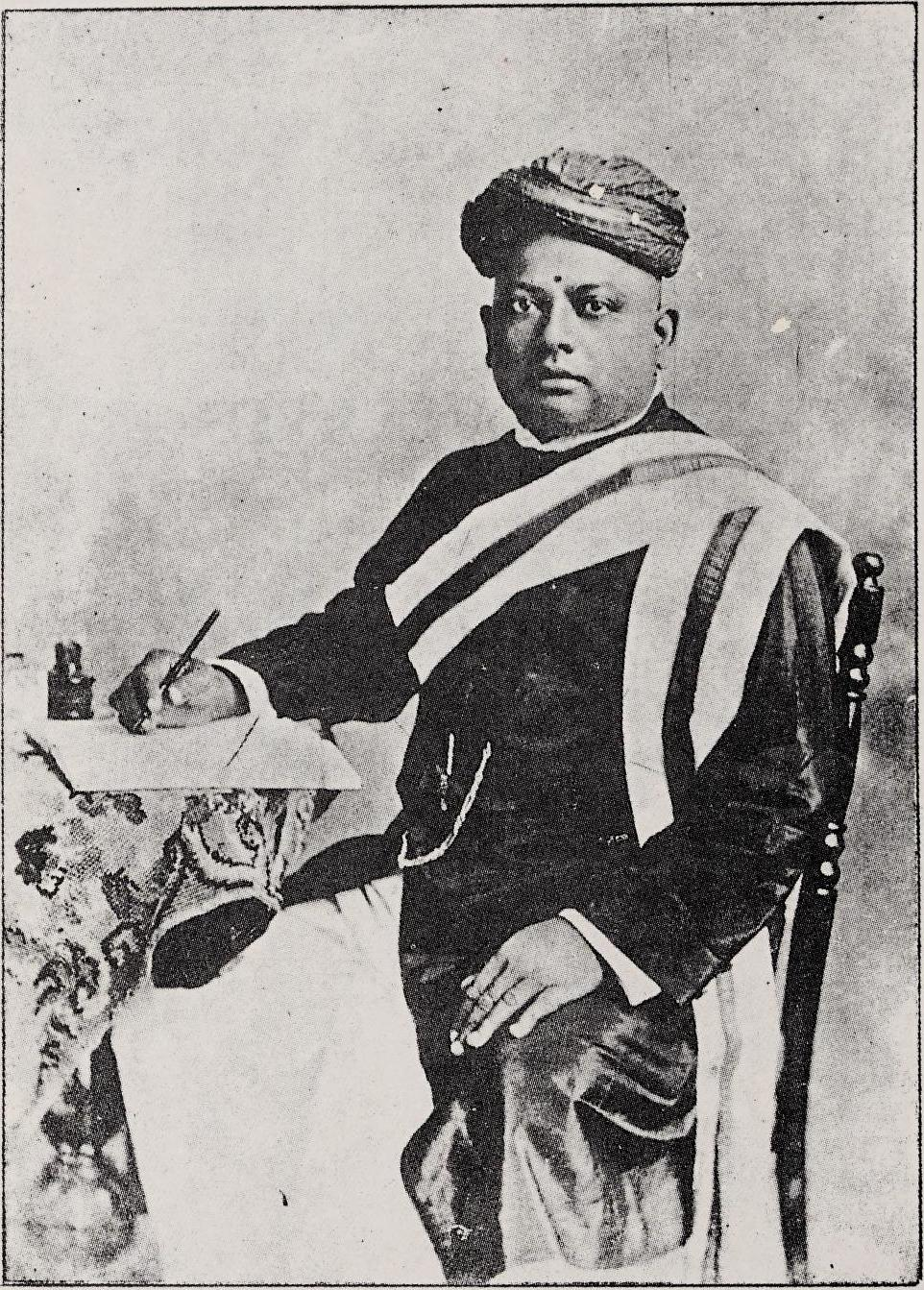
- Natesa Sastri before 1903
- Born: 1859; P. Sangendhi village ,Lalgudi Taluk , Tiruchirappalli district
- Died: 1906 (aged 46–47); Triplicane
- Citizenship: British India
- Education: Bachelor's degree in Arts
- Alma mater: Madras University
- Occupations: writer, Manager in the office of Inspector General of Documents Registration, Madras.
- Writing career
- Language: Tamil
- Subject: folk

Signature
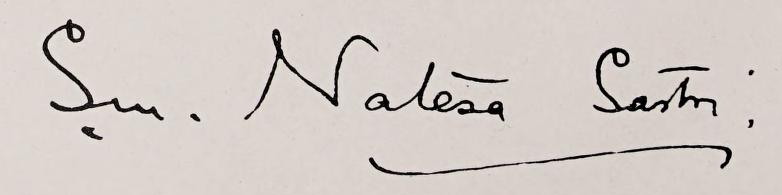

S. M. Natesa Sastri (1859–1906) was a polyglot, scholar in eighteen languages and authored many books in Tamil, Sanskrit and English. His scholarliness over Tamil and Sanskrit languages got him the title "Pandit".

== Life ==
Sastri was born in a traditional Brahmin family in a village called as Sangendhi which is in Lalgudi taluk in Tiruchirappalli District . And he was educated at Kumbakonam College and the Madras University. At 22, he joined the Archaeological Survey of India as an assistant to Robert Sewell.

Chembai Vaidyanatha Bhagavatar was one of his prominent disciples.

In 1906, he died tragically after being trampled by a horse at a temple festival in Madras.

== Work ==
His most popular works were his collections of Tamil folk tales. He published a four-volume collection of Tamil folk tales titled The Folklore of Southern India (1884–88). He believed that folklore was national literature, and that it was "the most trustworthy manifestation of people's real thoughts and characteristics." Sastri's collections were based on Tamil versions of the folk tales drawn from his own memory and translated to English, and addressed to non-Indian audiences.

It was Richard Carnac Temple, a British folklorist in India who served as the President of the Folklore Society, who inspired Sastri's work and encouraged him to publish his first book on the tales. One review of the Folklore Society proclaimed that Sastri was the only Hindu member of the organisation.

Sastri was very keen in emphasising the importance of folktales. However, despite the irrefutably native credentials of folklore, it did not ultimately become an important vehicle for nationalism in Madras, having been eclipsed by the Tamil classics of the Sangam period.

Apart from his work on folk tales, Sastri published critical studies of Sanskrit literature, translations of Valmiki's Ramayana and several of Shakespeare's plays and six Tamil novels, over his twenty-five year long scholarly career.

=== Novels ===
- His first original Tamil novel, Dinadayalu was first published under a pseudonym in 1900. It was the story of a Brahmin man whose mother died when he was young. A revised and enlarged edition appeared in 1902.
- The Rejuvenation of Komalan (1902), is a piece of bizarre comic romance in which two sisters obtain a drug which makes younger.
- The Two Orphans (1902) is a moralising story covering the life of two orphaned sisters from their birth till their marriage.
- A Wife Condoned (1903) is a melo-dramatic story in which a woman has an adulterous relationship with another man. The motif of women's adultery was quite new in Tamil fiction at the time.
- The Mother-in-Law in Council (1903) is somewhat a historical novel combining social criticism, set in the 18th century.
- Curtain Lectures (1903) is an adaptation of Douglas Jerrold's Mrs. Caudle's curtain lectures.
