= Molly Whuppie =

Fairy tale

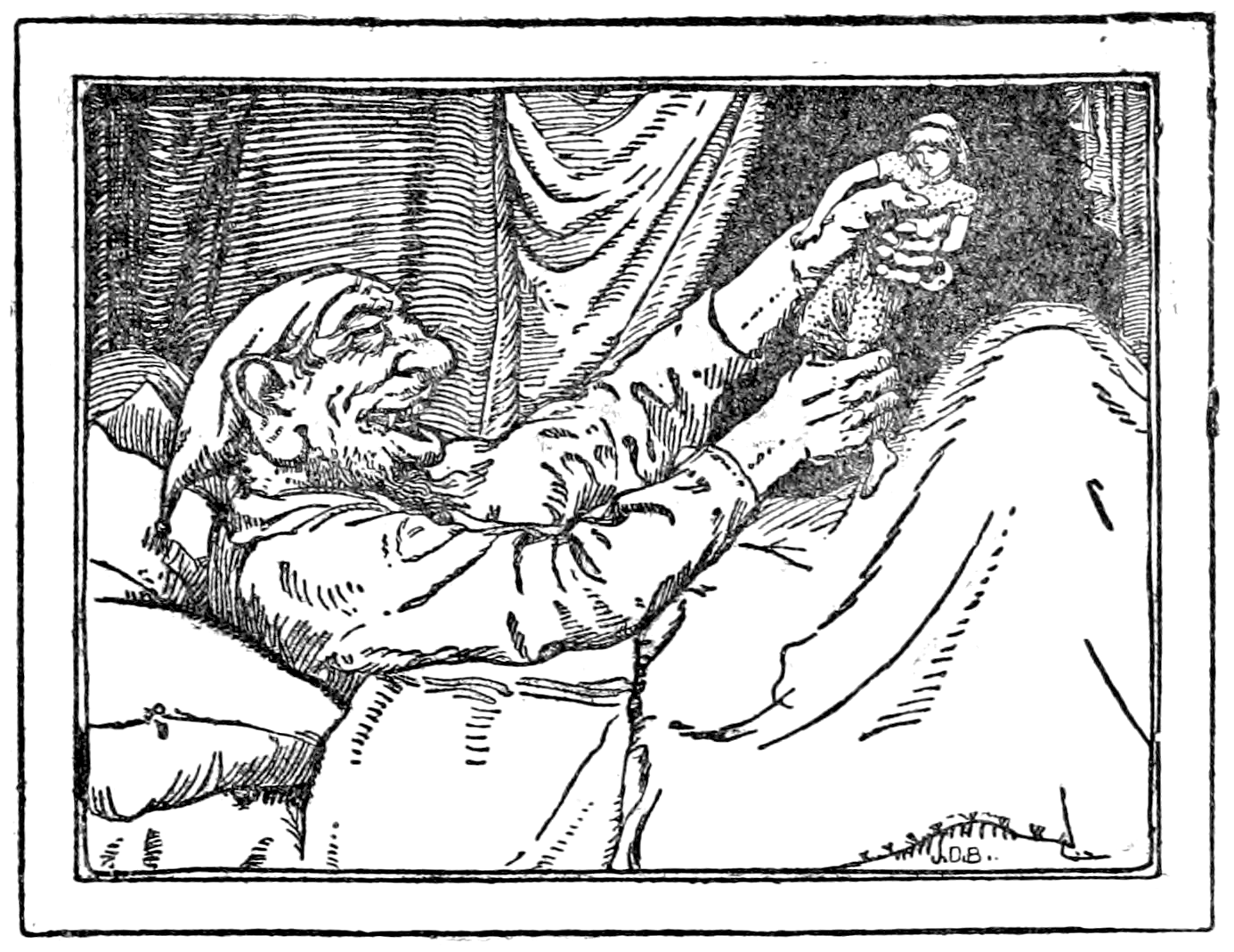

Folk tale
- Name: Molly Whuppie
- Also known as: Maol a Chliobain
- Aarne–Thompson grouping: ATU 327B, "The Brothers and the Ogre" + ATU 328, "Boy Steals the Ogre's Treasure"
- Country: England
- Published in: English Fairy Tales

Molly Whuppie is an English language fairy tale set in Scotland. It was first published in 'Three Folk-Tales from Old Meldrum, Aberdeenshire' in "Folklore" (6.2.1884). Rev. Walter Gregor said that the tales had been 'communicated to me by Mr. Moir, Rector of the Grammar School, Aberdeen. He had them from his mother, who kindly wrote out " Mally Whuppie " and " The Red Calf" at my request.' Anglicising the name to "Molly" from "Mally" Joseph Jacobs used this source of the story in his English Fairy Tales A Highland version, Maol a Chliobain, was collected by John Francis Campbell in Popular Tales of the West Highlands. Jacobs noted the relationship between the two tales, and an Irish variant, "Smallhead," and concluded that the tale was Celtic in origin.

It is Aarne-Thompson (ATU) type 327B, "The Brothers and the Ogre" – although, unusually, it is a girl who defeats the ogre. Others of this type include "Esben and the Witch" and "Hop o' My Thumb". Other tales using these motifs include "Jack and the Beanstalk" and "Boots and the Troll".

== Synopsis ==
In the Molly variant, a couple had too many children, so they took the three youngest into the forest and left them.

In the Maol variant, three daughters left their mother to seek their fortune. She baked three bannocks and offered each of them the choice between the larger portion and her curse, and the small portion and her blessing. Only Maol took the blessing. Her older sisters did not want her and tried to keep her away three times, tying her to a rock, a peat stack, and tree, but her mother's blessing let her follow them, so they went on together.

They came to a house and begged to be let in. The woman warned them that her husband was a giant and would eat them. They promised to leave before he came, but no sooner had she given them something to eat than he arrived. She told him that they were three little lassies and he was not to hurt them. He ordered them to stay the night and share his three daughters' beds. He put gold chains about his daughters' necks and straw chains about the lassies', or chunks of amber about his daughters' necks and horsehair about the lassies'. Molly, the youngest, switched them. In the middle of the night, the giant beat his daughters to death, or sent a servant to bring him the blood of the strange girls to drink because there was no water, and the servant killed them. Molly woke her sisters, and they ran away. In the Maol variant, they had to cross a river to escape the giant.

They ran on to a king's palace, or to a great farm. Their story impressed the king or farmer, but he said if she stole the giant's sword from the back of his bed, he would marry his oldest son to her oldest sister. She went and hid under the bed. When the giant went to sleep, she stole the sword. It rattled when she went over the threshold, and the giant chased her, but she escaped over the bridge of one hair. The king married his oldest son to her oldest sister, and then told her if she stole the purse the giant kept under his pillow, he would marry his second son to her second sister. Once again she hid under the bed and stole it while he slept, but he woke and chased her, and again she escaped over the bridge of one hair. Her second sister was married to the king's second son.

Then the king said if she stole the ring the giant wore on his finger, he would marry his youngest son to her. She went off, hid under the bed, and grabbed the ring, but the giant caught her. He asked what she would do if he had done to her what she had done to him and she had caught him. She said she would put him in a sack, with a dog, a cat, a needle, thread, and shears. Then she would hang the sack on the wall, go to the woods for a thick stick, and come back and beat him dead. The giant declared that he would do just that. When she was in the sack and he was gone, Molly began to say, "Oh, if ye saw what I see." The giant's wife asked her what she meant until she asked if she could see the same. Molly cut her way out with the shears and sewed the wife into it. The giant came back and began to hit her. The dog's barking and the cat's meows were too loud for him to hear his wife's voice, but he saw Molly running off with the ring. He chased her, but she escaped over the bridge of one hair, married the king's youngest son, and never saw the giant again.

== Publication ==
The tale was also published by author Flora Annie Steel in English Fairy Tales, with the title Molly Whuppie and the Double-Faced Giant.

== Analysis ==
=== Tale type ===
The tale is classified in the international Aarne-Thompson-Uther Index as both tale type ATU 327B, "Small Boy Defeats the Ogre" (first part), and ATU 328, "Boy Steals the Giant's Treasure" (second part).

=== Motifs ===
The motif of the mother's blessing for less food or her curse for more is a common British folktale theme: "Jack and his Comrades", "The Red Ettin", "The King Of Lochlin's Three Daughters", "The Adventures of Covan the Brown-haired", and "Jack and His Golden Snuff-Box".

According to German scholar Kurt Ranke, in Enzyklopädie des Märchens, a heroine appears as the protagonist of tale type ATU 328 more than other types. Variants with the heroine appear in Celtic (Ireland and Scotland) and Germanic languages (England, Scandinavia and Anglo-American tradition).

== See also ==
- Finette Cendron
- Hansel and Gretel
