= The Thirteenth Son of the King of Erin =

Irish fairy tale

Folk tale
- Name: The Thirteenth Son of the King of Erin
- Aarne–Thompson grouping: ATU 300 (The Dragon-Slayer)
- Country: Ireland
- Published in: Myths and Folk-lore of Ireland

"The Thirteenth Son of the King of Erin" is an Irish fairy tale collected by Jeremiah Curtin in Myths and Folk-lore of Ireland.

== Synopsis ==
A king had thirteen sons. One day, he saw a swan driving away one of its thirteen cygnets, and a seer explained that any man or beast with thirteen young should drive one away, to fall under Heaven's will. The king could not bear to choose one of his sons. The seer said he should shut the door on the last son to return that night. This was the oldest named Seán Ruadh. He asked his father for an outfit for the road and the king gave him it and a black horse that could run faster than the wind.

One day, he put on some poor clothing and was hired by a king to herd his cows. The king also told him that an urfeist, a sea serpent, demanded a king's daughter every seven years, and this year the lot had fallen on his own daughter. Many king's sons said they would save her, but her father did not believe them. The sea serpent would appear one day, he did not know when.

Three giants lived near the king's lands. Seán Ruadh pastured the cows on their lands, and fought with them, one per day. They promised their swords of light and horses if he would spare them, but he killed them, and their housekeepers, glad to be freed, showed him all their treasures. Each day, the cows gave more milk than they ever had before.

On the fourth day, he dressed in the black clothing of the first giant, took its black horse, and went down the shore. The princess awaited urfeist there. Seán Ruadh asked her to take his head in her lap until it arrived; then she should wake him. She took it, took three hairs from his head, and woke him when the urfeist arrived. They fought. Seán Ruadh cut off its head, but it instantly grew back. The sea serpent left, but said it would return.

The next day, he wore the blue clothing of the second giant and rode its brown horse, but when he laid down as before, the princess compared his hair to the three hairs and noted he was the same knight as the first one. He cut urfeist in half, but the halves joined again, and it threatened that no one would save her the third day.

The third day, he wore the many-colored clothing of the third giant, with its blue glass boots, and rode its red horse. When he was dressed the housekeeper told him that no one could fight urfeist that day; the only way to defeat him was to throw the brown apple she gave him down its open mouth. He took it. Again, the princess knew him by the hairs. He threw the brown apple, and urfeist melted away into jelly. The princess grabbed his boots and one came off. He had to leave it with her.

Many men claimed to be the hero, but a seer said they must all try on the boot. Finally, every man had tried it except the cowherd. They sent twenty men for him, but he overpowered them; when they sent another twenty, he overpowered them as well. Finally, the seer told the king to go himself. When the king asked and told him not to mind his work, Seán Ruadh came. The boot fitted on of its own. The princess jumped to his arms. He was told that the men swarming about had claimed to have saved her and he cut off all their heads. Then he married the princess at a great wedding feast and took her with him to the giants' lands.

== Analysis ==
This tale is classified in the Aarne-Thompson-Uther Index as tale type ATU 300, "The Dragon-Slayer".

== See also ==
- Cinderella
- The Bold Knight, the Apples of Youth, and the Water of Life
- The King of Lochlin's Three Daughters
- The Sea-Maiden
