= The Girl and the Dead Man =

Scottish fairy tale

The Girl and the Dead Man is a Scottish fairy tale collected by John Francis Campbell in Popular Tales of the West Highlands, listing his informant as Ann Darroch, in Islay.

== Synopsis ==
A poor woman's oldest daughter said she would go seek her fortune. The mother offered her a whole bannock with her curse or a little one with her blessing. She took the big one, and when she ate and birds begged for some, she refused it. She found a place at a house, watching by night over the body of the housewife's brother, which was under spells, but she fell asleep the first night and the mistress hit her such a blow that she died.

The second sister set out the same way and came to the same end.

The youngest also set out, but asked for the little one with her blessing, and shared it with the birds. She got the same place as her sisters, but stayed awake. In the night, the body propped itself up on its elbow and grinned; she threatened to beat it. It propped itself up twice more, and the third time, she hit it with a stick. The stick stuck to the body, and to her hand, and she had to follow it into the woods, where the nuts and sloes hit her as they went, but they got out of the woods and back to the house. They gave her a peck of gold and a peck of silver, and a cordial, which she used to bring her sisters back to life.

== See also ==
- Jack and his Comrades
- Jack and His Golden Snuff-Box
- Kate Crackernuts
- The Adventures of Covan the Brown-haired
- The King Of Lochlin's Three Daughters
- The Red Ettin
- The Story of the Youth Who Went Forth to Learn What Fear Was
