= Conall Cra Bhuidhe =

Scottish fairy tale

"Conall Cra Bhuidhe" or "Conall Yellowclaw" is a Scottish fairy tale collected by John Francis Campbell in Popular Tales of the West Highlands.

== Origin ==
Campbell lists his informant as James Wilson, blind fiddler in Islay.

== Synopsis ==
Conall Cra Bhuidhe was a royal tenant and had four (or three) sons. One day, his sons and the king's son fought, and the king's big son was killed. The king told Conall that he could save his sons if he stole the brown horse of the King of Lochlann. Conall told him that he would steal the horse to please the king, even if his sons were in no danger. His wife lamented that he had not rather let the king kill his sons than endanger himself.

Conall went with his sons to Lochlann, and there he told them to seek out the king's miller. They stayed with him, and Conall bribed the miller to put him and his sons in the sacks of bran he delivered to the king. In the stables, Conall had his sons make hiding holes before they tried to steal the horse. When they tried, it kept making such noise that the servants would come. They would hide, but in time, the king realized that there were men in the stables and found Conall and his sons.

Conall told his story and because he had had to steal it, the king said he would not hang him, but he would hang his sons. He told Conall that if he were ever in a worse situation than his sons, and told him the story, he would give Conall his youngest son.

Conall told of a time when he went to get a cow and its calf with his servant, and they met with cats. The head bard among them told cat after cat to sing a cronan to Conall, and demanded that he pay a reward for it. First he had to give the calf, then the cow, then (in Campbell's version) the servant, and finally the cats went after him. He got up a tree and killed a cat that came after him, but the cats dug at the tree's roots. Fortunately, a priest was traveling with delving men and heard the noise, and they came to his rescue.

The king told him he had won his youngest son, and if he could tell him of a still harder case, he would give him his next youngest son. Conall told of a time that he followed some smoke and fell into a giant's cave. It threatened to kill him, but it was blind in one eye, and Conall said he could cure that eye, and blinded it in the other instead. In the morning, the giant ordered him to free the goats. Conall killed one and in its hide escaped with the rest. The giant realized this and offered him a ring for his stalwartness. Conall told it to throw it to the ground and he would take it; he did, and it called to the giant when he called to it, and Conall could not take it off. He cut off his finger and threw it into the sea, and when it called back to the giant, the giant followed it and drowned. Conall took all its gold and silver and offered as proof that he was in fact missing a finger.

The king told him he had won his next youngest son, and if he could tell him of a still harder case, he would give him his (next) oldest son. Conall told him that he was married, but went to sea and found a woman trying to slit the throat of a baby by a cauldron. He asked her and she told him that the giant that lives there would kill her if she did not. He managed to trick the giant, but the giant caught him and Conall barely managed to kill him in time.

The king's mother was listening to this and told him that she had been the woman and he had been the baby, so Conall had saved his life. The king gave him the horse, gold and silver, and all the lives of his sons.

== Analysis ==
The tale has been classified in the Aarne–Thompson–Uther Index system as ATU 953 "The Robber and His Sons".

The tale type is likely to have a literary origin.

Professional researcher and storyteller Csenge Virág Zalka lists the tale type as folklore material that depicts loving fathers.

Discussing the tale type as a whole, Herbert Halpert and J. D. A. Widdowson compared the use of the frame story to classical literary productions like The Canterbury Tales or the Heptaméron.

== Variants ==
A medieval literary version, "The Sons of the Bandit", appears in Dolopathos by John of Alta Silva.

The Brothers Grimm removed a variant called "The Robber and His Sons", from the final edition of Children’s and Household Tales because it too closely resembled the Greek myth of how Odysseus blinded Polyphemus the Cyclops.

Joseph Jacobs included it in Celtic Fairy Tales, softening one episode and noting it occurred as The Black Thief and Knight of the Glen in Ireland.

MacEdward Leach located a Celtic version from Cape Breton, which he first obtained from Ronald Smith.

A Canadian variant, "Red Conall of the Tricks," appears in The Blue Mountains and Other Gaelic Stories from Cape Breton by John Shaw.
