= The Ridere of Riddles =

Scottish fairy tale

The Ridere of Riddles is a Scottish fairy tale collected by John Francis Campbell in Popular Tales of the West Highlands, listing as his informant John Mackenzie, a fisherman near Inverary. Joseph Jacobs included it, somewhat altered, in More Celtic Fairy Tales.

== Synopsis ==
A king's queen died when his son was born. He remarried, and his new wife also had a son. The stepmother tried to poison the first son so her son would inherit, but her son warned his brother. The first son decided to flee before she succeed, and his brother went with him. They tried the drinks she had given the older brother on their horses, and found they were poisonous. Then twelve ravens came to eat the dead horses and died as well. They took the ravens' bodies and had them made into pies. When they went on, they were waylaid by robbers; they claimed to have no purses but some food. The robbers took the pies, ate them, and died. The brothers took their gold and silver and went on to the Ridere (or Knight) of Riddles, whose beautiful daughter would marry whoever asked a riddle her father could not guess.

There, they asked, "One killed two, and two killed twelve, and twelve killed four and twenty, and two got out of it." The ridere could not guess, and sent maidens to wheedle the answer out. Twelve maidens lost their plaids to the younger brother, but could not get the answer. Finally, the princess herself went, and got the answer from the older brother, but left her plaid. The ridere would have executed them, but the older brother told the story of how his brother had shot twelve hares and got their hides, and he had shot a fine one and gotten her hide, so the ridere married him to his daughter. The younger brother went on, and the older gave him the right to the throne at home.

Three giants lived nearby, and the ridere told his son-in-law that if he had spirit, he would kill them. He did it, and was named the Hero of the White Shield, and went to live on the giants' lands. His brother heard of him, without knowing who he was, and went to fight with him. They fought, and neither one won, and they told each other their names.

The brother went home, but on the way, he saw twelve young men playing at shinny and learned they were his twelve sons, by twelve different mothers. He took both the young men and their mothers home with him.

== See also ==
Both Jacobs and Campbell noted the similarity between this and Grimms' The Riddle, but that there is no information to discern which is the source.
