= Kilmyshall =

Village in County Wexford, Ireland

Kilmyshall Cill Maisil
- Village
- Location in Ireland
- Coordinates: 52°37′34″N 6°39′02″W
- Country: Ireland
- Province: Leinster
- County: County Wexford

Population (2016)
  - Total: 149

Kilmyshall (Irish: Cill Maisil) is a village in County Wexford, Ireland, about 3 kilometres (2 mi) south of Bunclody. The population was 149 at the 2016 census. The 19th-century folklorist Patrick Kennedy was born in Kilmyshall. The village's Catholic church, Saint Mary Magdalene's, was completed in 1831.
