= Jack and His Golden Snuff-Box =

Romani fairy tale

Folk tale
- Name: Jack and His Golden Snuff-Box
- Aarne–Thompson grouping: ATU 560 (The Magic Ring)
- Mythology: Romani
- Country: England
- Published in: In Gypsy Tents, by Francis Hindes Groome; English Fairy Tales, by Joseph Jacobs
- Related: The Red Ettin, The Girl and the Dead Man, The Adventures of Covan the Brown-haired

Jack and His Golden Snuff-Box is a Romani fairy tale collected by Joseph Jacobs in English Fairy Tales. He listed as his source Francis Hindes Groome's In Gypsy Tents.

Ruth Manning-Sanders included it in The Red King and the Witch: Gypsy Folk and Fairy Tales.

== Plot ==
Jack lived with his parents in the forest, never seeing anyone else. He decided to leave one day, and his mother offered him a big cake with her curse or a little one with her blessing. He took the big one. He met his father on the way, and his father gave him a golden snuff-box, to open only when he was in danger of death.

He came to a house and asked for some food and a place to stay. The servant told the master, who asked him what he could do; he said, anything, meaning any bit of work about the house, but the master demanded a great lake and a man-of-war on it, ready to fire a salute, or Jack would forfeit his life. Jack opened the snuff-box, and three little red men hopped out. He told them what was needed, and they told him to go to sleep. In the morning, there was a lake and a man-of-war.

The master said that with two more tasks, he could marry his daughter. He felled all the trees about, and built the master a castle with a regiment, and married the daughter.

One day, as they went on a hunt, a valet found the snuff-box and with it carried the castle and himself over the sea. The master threatened to take Jack's wife from him, but agreed that Jack should have a year and a day to bring it back. He set out and met the King of the Mice, who summoned all the mice in the world. When none of them had seen it, he sent Jack on to the King of the Frogs, giving him a new horse. A little mouse asked to come with him, Jack tried to refuse on the grounds of offending the king, but the mouse told him it would be better. The King of the Frogs summoned all the frogs in the world. When none of them had seen it, he sent Jack on to the King of the Birds. A little frog asked to come with him, and again Jack was persuaded. The King of the Birds summoned all the birds, and last of all, an eagle came, and told of the castle. The eagle carried him to it, and the mouse stole the box back. They quarreled as they went back, and the box fell into the sea, but the frog retrieved it.

When he returned to the King of the Birds, he had the little men retrieve the castle. The men waited until everyone there but a cook and a maid had left for a dance; then they asked them whether they would rather go or stay, and when they said go, told them to run into the castle. Then Jack had them carry it to the King of the Frogs, and then next day to the King of the Mice, where he left it and rode home on his horse. There, he had the little men bring him the castle, and his wife showed him his new son.

== Commentary ==
The offer of a big cake or a little is common in British fairy tales —The Red Ettin, The Girl and the Dead Man, The Adventures of Covan the Brown-haired, and The King Of Lochlin's Three Daughters—but this tale is unique in that the big cake is not claimed by the hero's older brothers, but by the hero himself. Even in Jack and his Comrades, where the hero is the only one offered it, he prefers the smaller cake and the blessing. The traditional bannocks (breads) of the Gaelic regions held a ritual role in the marking of the seasons.

Parts of the tale also echo some parts of the Aladdin story: the hero winning a bride due to the genie/little men magically creating a palace/castle, and the lamp/snuffbox being stolen and recovered.

== See also ==
- Aladdin
- King Kojata
- The Bronze Ring
- The Prince and the Princess in the Forest
- The Prince Who Wanted to See the World
