= Jack and His Comrades =

Irish fairy tale

Folk tale
- Name: Jack and His Comrades
- Aarne–Thompson grouping: ATU 130 (Outcast Animals Find a New Home)
- Country: Ireland
- Origin Date: 1866
- Published in: Legendary Fictions of the Irish Celts

Jack and his Comrades is a short Irish fairy tale describing the title character's story of success with the help of his animal helpers, collected by folklorist Patrick Kennedy from a resident of County Wexford, Ireland, and published in Legendary Fictions of the Irish Celts (1866). It was later reprinted, revised but only slightly, by Joseph Jacobs in his Celtic fairy tale compilation.

In the Aarne-Thompson categorisation system, this can be classed as "folktale type 130", i.e. "outcast animals find a new home".

Kennedy collected the tale from a man named Garrett (Gerald) Forrestal, residing in the former barony of Bantry, in Wexford.

== Synopsis ==
Jack tells his mother he will seek his fortune. His mother offers him half a hen and half a cake with her blessing, or the whole of both without; he asks for the halves and is given the whole of both, with her blessing. On his way, he meets a donkey (Neddy) in a bog and helps it out. A dog (Coley) runs up to him for protection, with a pot tied to its tail and a crowd hunting it; the donkey bellows and scares them off and Jack unties the pot. He shares his meal with the dog, while the donkey eats thistles; a half-starved cat (Tom) comes by, and Jack gives it a bone with meat. In the evening, they rescue a cockerel from a fox. The cockerel is referred to as Irish: Cuileach Dhubh or "Black Cock".

They go to sleep in the woods. The cockerel crows, claiming to see dawn, and Jack realises that it's a candle in a house. They spy a look inside, and discover it to be a robbers' den. With the donkey placing its fore-hoofs on the window-sill, the animals stack one on top of another and make noise, then, at Jack's deceptive call to raise the pistols and fire, the beasts smash all the window panes, frightening the robbers into bolting the house and riding far out into the woods. Jack and the animals enter the house, enjoy a meal, and go to sleep. After a while, the captain of the robbers sorely misses the loot he left behind. He sneaks back inside the house in the dark, only to receive scratches from the cat, a bite from the dog, pecking from the cockerel, and finally a great kick from the donkey at the stable outside. The captain (who could see nothing in the dark) weaves a fancifully horrid account of what happened, adding that not all the plaster (a healing salve or potion, often applied thickly) in Enniscorthy would heal the cuts and wounds he received, and the other robbers lose all craving of trying to retrieve their loot.

Jack and comrades resolve next day to return the stolen gold to its owner, and journey to the manor of the Lord of Dunlavin. Jack is halted at the door by the crooked porter. Jack and the rest know from the thieves' conversation the night before that this porter was in league with the thieves, and complicit in the crime. The cockerel makes a sarcastic remark, plainly accusing the porter of giving the thieves free passage through the door to his master's house, and the porter's face turns completely crimson. The interchange is witnessed by the Lord of Dunlavin, who, addressing the porter by name (Barney), prods him to answer the charge, and the porter replies "sure I didn't open the door to the six robbers", thus betraying his own familiarity with the perpetrators.

Jack announces that, no matter, he has arrived with the stolen gold and silver, and requested a supper and lodging after a long ride from Athsalach ('muddy ford'). (Note: This Athsalach that might be in County Wexford is inferred from the thief captain's mention of Enniscorthy that indicates he is native to Co. Wexford. There are at least two places named "Ath Salach" in completely different locales. One is the ford that St. Ciarán of Clonmacnoise crossed on getting home, which shares an alternate name "Ath Saile" ('ford of the brine') with Assaly, located south of Wexford town. (Hogan, Edmund (1910). Onomasticon Goedelicum. "á. saile: Assaly, in b. Forth, c. Wexf.[;] á. salach, nr. Sierkieran, on the way from it to Clonmacnois, Sil. 14, Bc. 31." UCC)) The grateful lord declares he would provide them comfort enough to live out their lives, appointing Jack as his steward, brought his mother to live near the castle, and eventually married his lordship's daughter.

== Commentary ==
Jacobs cited listed the following three parallels (or cognates) to the present tale:

- "How Jack Went to Seek his Fortune" (American; No. 5 in Jacobs's English Fairy Tales)
- "Story of the White Pet" (Scottish; No. 11 in Campbell's Popular Tales of the West Highlands)
- Town Musicians of Bremen (German; Grimms' KHM 27)

In the Scottish and German counterparts, just the animals and no human seek their fortune, but still the similarities are striking.

The big and the little cakes are a common motif, although Jack is unusual in having no older brothers; preferring the smaller cake is often the distinguishing mark of the youngest child, as in The King of Lochlin's Three Daughters, The Adventures of Covan the Brown-haired, and The Girl and the Dead Man.

The "animals helpers" or "Helpful Animals" motif (Stith Thompson Motif-index B300-) is also common to many folktales. Puss 'n Boots is a famous example, though only one animal is featured. Many of the Irish or Scottish folktales that mention the Sword of Light (Claíomh Solais) also involve animal helpers, though those animals typically demonstrate some supernatural (magical) feats, rather than the sober mundane assistance given here.
