= The Black Thief and Knight of the Glen =

Irish fairy tale

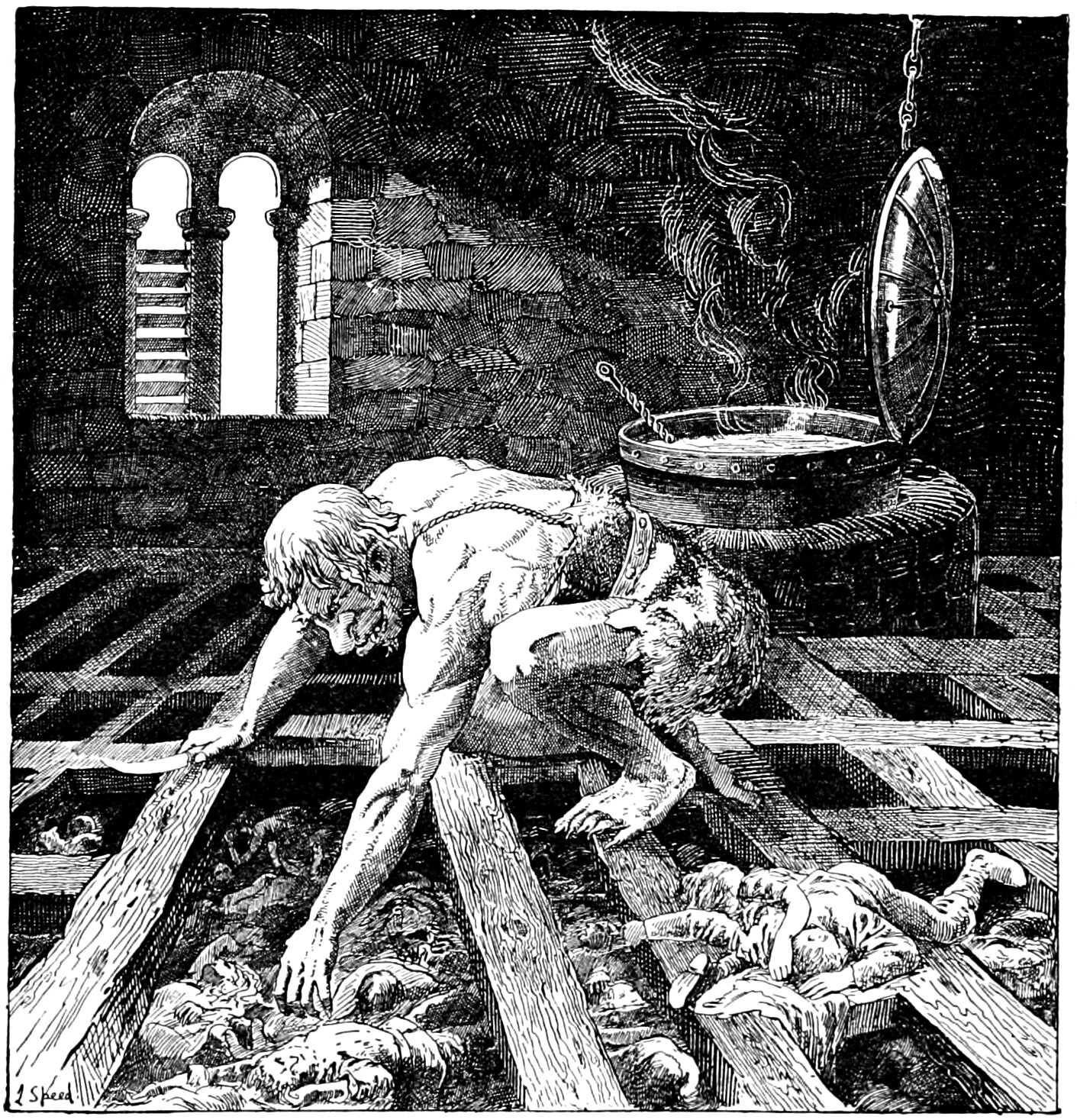
- Andrew Lang

Folk tale
- Name: The Black Thief and Knight of the Glen
- Aarne–Thompson grouping: ATU 953 (The Old Robber Relates Three Adventures)
- Country: Ireland
- Published in: Hibernian Tales

The Black Thief and Knight of the Glen is an Irish fairy tale collected in Hibernian Tales. Andrew Lang included it in The Red Fairy Book.

It is Aarne-Thompson type 953 ("The Old Robber Relates Three Adventures").

== Synopsis ==
A dying queen made her husband promise to hide her sons from the new queen by raising them in an island on a lake. When the king remarried, a henwife told the stepmother she knew a secret, and when the queen paid her richly, told her of her stepsons, and demanded that they be brought to court. The henwife gave the queen cards and told her to play with the stepsons for a geasa. The queen defeated her older two stepsons, but the youngest won. She set a geasa that the older two must steal: the Knight of the Glen's wild Steed of Bells. The youngest said that he will go with his brother, and set a geasa that she stand on a tower with her face to the wind, with a sheaf of corn to eat and water to drink, until they returned.

The princes met the Black Thief of Sloan, who warned them of the danger but came with them. When they tried to steal the horse, it rang the bells so that it warned the Knight and they were caught.

The knight took them to a furnace, to boil them, from the oldest to the youngest of the princes, and then the Black Thief. The Black Thief said that he had once been in more danger than the oldest and escaped with his life. The Knight said that if he told him that story, he would pardon the oldest son. The Black Thief told that he had once seen three witches going to sleep with their gold under the heads to keep the Black Thief from stealing it; he had put turf under their heads instead and gone off with the gold. They chased him as a greyhound, a hare, and a hawk. He climbed a tree. They changed themselves into a smith's anvil and a piece of iron, which the third one made a hatchet of, and she started to cut down the tree. But just then, a cock crowed and they disappeared.

The knight pardoned the oldest son and set about to boil the second.

The Black Thief said he might yet escape, and the knight said that if he had been in another such great danger, he would pardon the second. The Black Thief told he had heard how a rich bishop had been buried with jewels and rich robes, and he went to rob the grave. He heard footsteps and lost courage. Then he met with a dark figure, which he shot at, and found it was one of the clergy, who had already rifled the tomb. Some guards came. He held up the body, and the guards shot at it, and ran into the tomb to ensure he had no others with him. The Black Thief escaped once they were past him.

The knight pardoned the second son and said he would pardon the youngest for yet another such tale.

The Black Thief told how he had once come to a castle where a woman held a child and wept. She told him that a giant lived there and had ordered her to kill the child and cook it in a pie. He killed her a pig and had her cut off a finger; then she baked the pie. When the giant returned, the woman had him hid in a room where the giant kept corpses. The giant doubted the pie, but the woman showed him the finger. Being not full, he went to cut off some meat from the corpses, and cut off some from the thief. He did not cry out, and the giant got drunk and slept. He blinded it but could not kill it. The giant threw a ring after him, and it leapt on his toe, where it called out whenever the giant did. The thief cut off the toe and threw it into a fishpond, where it called to the giant, who followed and drowned.

An old woman told the knight that he was the baby and she the woman, and the thief the man who had saved his life. They told the knight why they had to get the horse, and to spare their lives, he gave him it. The queen heard them coming, and threw herself from the tower and died.

== Variants ==
Joseph Jacobs included the Scottish Conall Cra Bhuidhe in Celtic Fairy Tales, with notes that the Irish version was The Black Thief and Knight of the Glen.

The Texas Folklore Society included a variant in its thirty-fourth publication, which also mentioned versions published in the writings of Jeremiah Curtin and William Thackery.

Three variants were collected in Newfoundland.

"The Byzantine Brigand," told by Angus MacLellan, was collected for Stories from South Uist.

A variant from Australia, The Witch's Tale, appears in the autobiography of Simon McDonald.

A Canadian variant, "The Black Thief" was given by Lauchie MacLellan of Nova Scotia.

== See also ==
- How Ian Direach got the Blue Falcon
