= The Seven Foals =

Norwegian fairy tale

The Seven Foals (in Norwegian : De syv folene) is a Norwegian fairy tale collected by Peter Christen Asbjørnsen and Jørgen Moe. It is included in Andrew Lang's Red Fairy Book.

The hero of the story is sometimes called, in an analogue to Cinderella, Cinder-lad.

== Synopsis ==
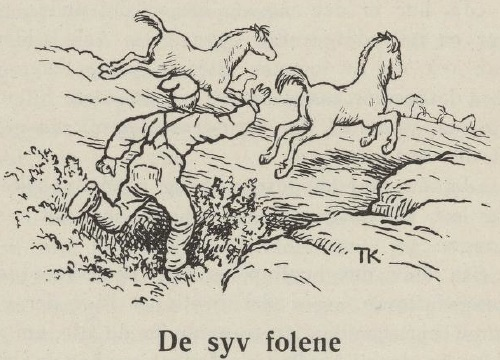

A poor couple had three sons, the youngest of whom would lie about in the ashes.

The oldest went to the king to enter his service. The king set him to watch his seven foals all day and find out what they ate and drank. If he succeeded, he would marry the princess and receive half the kingdom; if he failed, he would have three strips taken out of his back.

The next morning, he had to chase after the seven foals and grew so tired that when an old woman, spinning, called him to stay with her and let her comb his hair, he did. In the evening, he was going to return home, but the old woman told him the seven foals would come back this way, and gave him moss and water to give to the king as what they ate and drank. The king had three stripes cut from his back and salt rubbed in them, and the oldest son went home.

The middle brother tried next, but it went with him as with his older brother.

The youngest brother decided to go, which made his brothers jeer at him and his parents plead, but he went. He took the same job as his brothers, but ran past the old woman, at which the youngest foal told him to ride it, because they had far to go. They reached a birch tree, and in a room inside it there were a sword and a pitcher. The foals asked him to wield the sword, which he could not, until he had drunk three times from the pitcher. They then made him promise to cut off their heads on his wedding day, because they were the princess's brothers, a troll had enchanted them into this form, and that would free them. Then they went on to a church where they received bread and wine from the priest, and the youngest son took some with him when they left.

When the king received the bread and wine, he made arrangements for the wedding, and when the youngest son cut off the foals' head and restored them as princes to their father, the king promised him the entire kingdom after he died.

== See also ==
- The Red Ettin
