= The Adventures of Covan the Brown-haired =

Celtic fairy tale

The Adventures of Covan the Brown-haired is a Celtic fairy tale translated by Dr. Macleod Clarke. Andrew Lang included it in The Orange Fairy Book.

== Synopsis ==
A goat herder and his wife had three sons and a daughter. One day, the daughter vanished while tending the kids. The kids came home. Her parents could not find her.

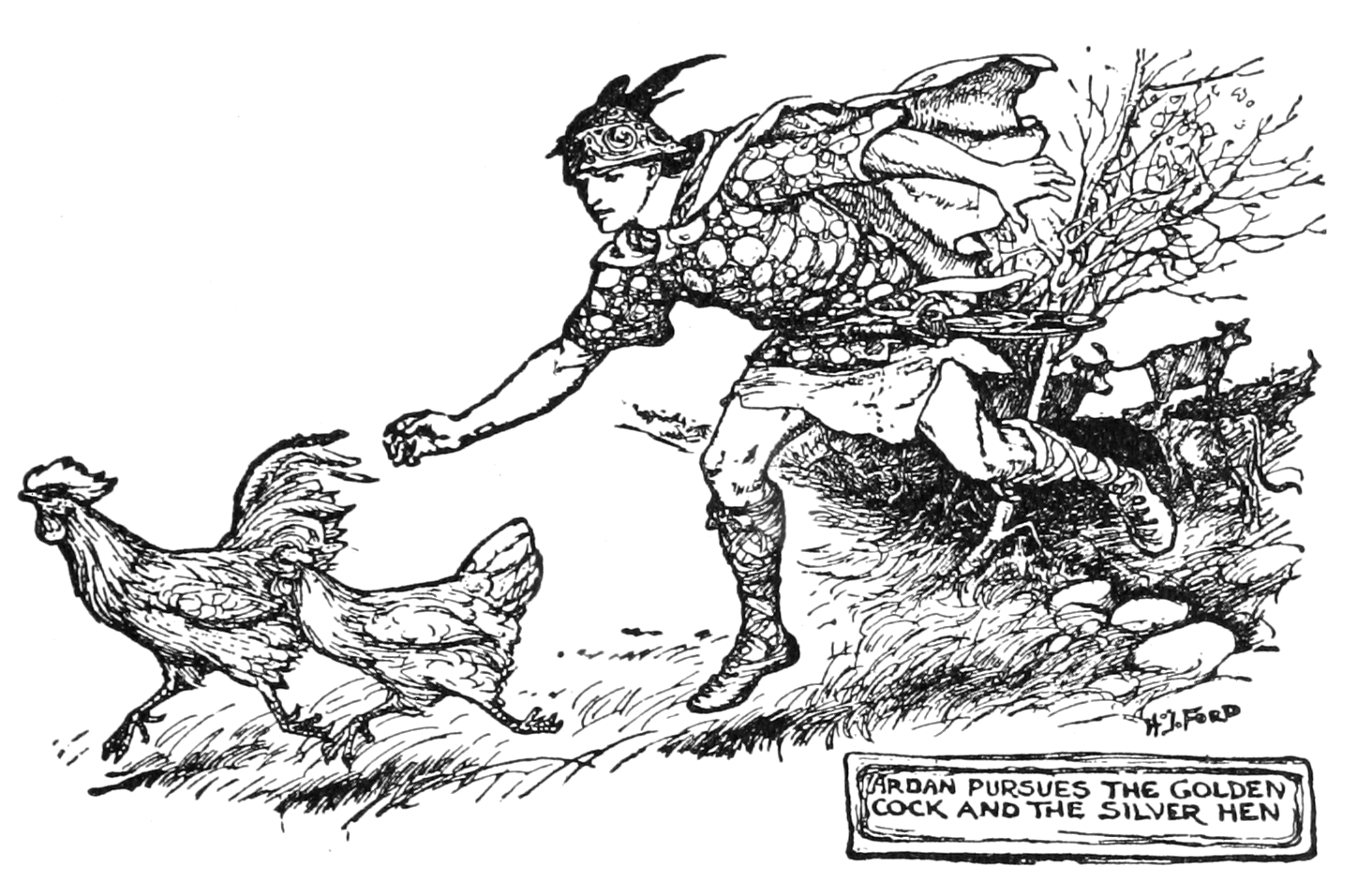

Ardan, the eldest son, declared he would set out in search of his sister. His mother reproved him for not asking his father first. But since he had made a vow, she made two cakes, a large one and a little one, and asked which one he wanted, the big one without her blessing or the little one with it. He picked the large cake. When a raven asked him for some, he refused it. Then he came to an old man in a cottage, with a young woman combing her hair of gold. The old man offered to let him watch his three cows for a year. The young woman warned against it, but he refused her advice rudely and took the service anyway.

The old man told him to follow the cows, because they knew good pasture, and to never leave them. But the first day watching the cows, he saw a golden cock and a silver hen, and let them distract him, and also a staff of gold and a staff of silver. When he brought them back, the cows had no milk, only water. The old man turned Ardan to stone.

Then Ruais, the second son, set out in the same manner, and suffered the same fate.

Finally, Covan the Brown-haired, the youngest, sought leave to go after his brothers and sister. His father gave him his blessing, and Covan took the smaller cake and gave the raven some. When he came to the cottage, he thanked the maiden for her advice, though he did not take it. He followed the cows and sat down when they came to pasture. There he heard music and listened to it. A boy ran to him and claimed his cows were in the corn; Covan said he could have driven them out in the time it took to come to him. Then the boy returned with the claim that dogs were worrying the cows; Covan said the boy could have driven the dogs out in the time he took to come running to him.

Then the cows went on. They went through a barren pasture, on which a mare and her foal were fat; a lush pasture with a starving mare and her foal, and a lake with two boats, one with happy youths going to the land of the Sun, and the other with grim shapes, going to the land of Night. The cows went on, and it grew so dark he could not see the cows. The Dog of Maol-mor, whom he had heard of, bade him stay the night. He did. In the morning, the dog was grateful, because he took what was offered and did not mock him, and so said he could call on him for aid. The next day, the cows ended in a barren plain. The raven offered him hospitality and he took it. The raven was grateful that he took it and did not mock it, and so said he could call on him for aid. The next day, the cows ended up by a river. The famous otter Doran-donn offered Covan his hospitality, and he took it, and the otter offered to come to his aid.

Then the cows returned, and they had milk instead of water. The old man was pleased and wanted to know what Covan wanted as a reward. Covan wanted to know how to get his brothers and sister back. The old man warned him that it would be hard, but told him where to get a roe with white feet and a deer's antlers, a duck with a green body and a gold neck, and a salmon with silver skin and red gills. If he brought those to the old man, he could get his brothers and sister back. The dog helped him catch the roe; the raven, the duck; and the otter, the salmon. The old man gave him back his sister, and restored his brothers, though they would be fated to wander forever for their idle and unfaithful ways.

Covan asked him his name. He said he was the Spirit of Age.

== See also ==
- Jack and his Comrades
- Jack and His Golden Snuff-Box
- The Girl and the Dead Man
- The King Of Lochlin's Three Daughters
- The Red Ettin
- The Seven Foals
