= Claíomh Solais =

Great weapon of Celtic myth

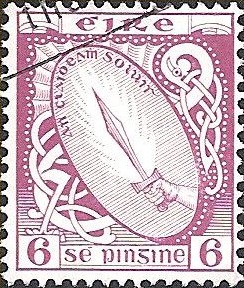
Definitive 6-pence stamp of Sword of Light, Ireland, 1922–3. Arched caption reads "An Claiḋeaṁ Soluis (An Claidheamh Soluis)"

The Sword of Light or Claidheamh Soluis (Old Irish; modern Irish: Claíomh Solais [ˌklˠiːw ˈsˠɔlˠəʃ]) is a trope object that appears in a number of Irish and Scottish Gaelic folktales. The "Quest for sword of light" formula is catalogued as motif H1337.

The sword appears commonly as a quest object in the Irish folktale of a hero seeking "The One Story" (or the "Cause of the one story about women"), which culminates in the discovery of a "Tale of the Werewolf" (a man magically turned wolf by an unfaithful wife). However, the sword is uninvolved in the man-wolf portion, and only figures in the hero-adventure frame story.

The sword of light, according to a different commentator, is a fixture of an Irish tale group describable as a quasi-bridal-quest. This characterization is inspired by the formula where the hero gains a beautiful wife (and riches) by gambling against a gruagach a.k.a. wizard-champion, but suffers losses which makes him beholden to mount on a hopeless-seeming quest. Like the actual "giant's daughter" bridal quest tales, the sword of light hero often gains assistance of "helpful animals" in completing his tasks or ordeals.

The sword has been regarded as a legacy to the god-slaying weapons of Irish mythology by certain scholars, such as T. F. O'Rahilly, the analogues being the primeval Celtic deity's lightning-weapon, Lugh's sling that felled Balor, the hero Cú Chulainn's supernatural spear Gáe Bulg and his shining sword Cruaidín Catutchenn.

== Forms ==
The spelling as appears in published Irish texts and scholastic commentary is Claidheamh Soluis alternatively (an) cloidheamh solais; but these are pre-reform spelling, and in modernized reformed spelling Claíomh Solais is used. The name has also been transliterated into Hiberno-English as chloive solais. The sword may be rendered in English as the "Sword of Light", or "Shining Sword".

Likewise, the Scottish Gaelic form is claidheamh solais "glaive of light", or claidheamh geal solais "White Glave of Light". (Note: While glaive can denote a broadsword, though it may often refer to a polearm.)

== Overview ==
The folk tales featuring the sword of light may be bridal quests, and the hero's would-be bride often becomes the hero's helper. (Note: Or involve the winning of husbands in e.g., Maol a Chliobain.)

But also typically the story is a sort of quasi-bridal quest, (Note: Joseph Baudiš remarks the tale group is similar to the "quest for the bride".) where the hero wins a bride by wager, but then suffers a loss, becoming oath-bound (compelled by geis (Note: By laying a geas or geasa (taboo), e.g., Kennedy's version, Ó Cillín ed. Cf. Hyde's version with Eng. tr.)) to never come home until he has completed the quest for the sword (and other objectives). The opponent who tempts the hero with this gambling game is usually a gruagach ("wizard-champion") or wizard/druid. (Note: draoidheadóir. sighe draoi, "the Druid",) and the sword's keeper is often a giant (athach, Scottish Gaelic: fhamhair) or hag (cailleach), (Note: Examples: Curtin ed. "Baranoir": "sword of light from the three evil war hags".) or a sibling of the wizard.

The sword-keeper oftentimes must be defeated (killed), which is not possible except by some secret means. Thus the hero or helper may resort to the sword of light as the only effective weapon against this enemy. But often the sword is not enough, and the supernatural enemy has to be attacked on a single vulnerable spot. The weak spot, moreover, may be an external soul (motif index E710) concealed somewhere in the world at large (inside animals, etc.); or, as in the case of "The Young King Of Easaidh Ruadh", this external soul is encased within a nested series of animals.

Typically bound up with the quest for the sword of light is the quest for the "One Story" (' truth about women'), namely, the story of the faithless wife who transforms her husband into a wolf.

The hero in some examples are compelled to perform (three) sets of tasks, aided by helpers, who may be the would-be bride, (Note: As in "The Thirteenth Son of the King of Erin", where the princess aids her rescuer who will win her if he succeeds, or "Morraha".) "helpful animals", (Note: "Helpful animals" being the phrase in Stith Thompson's motif-index. Examples: a goose, otter, and fox in O'Foharta and three brothers-in-law who transform into a ram, salmon, and eagle in "The Weaver's Son".) or a supernatural being ("little green/red man"). (Note: "little green man" (Irish: fear gearr glas) in Hyde, "little red man" in MacManus's variant.)

== Texts ==
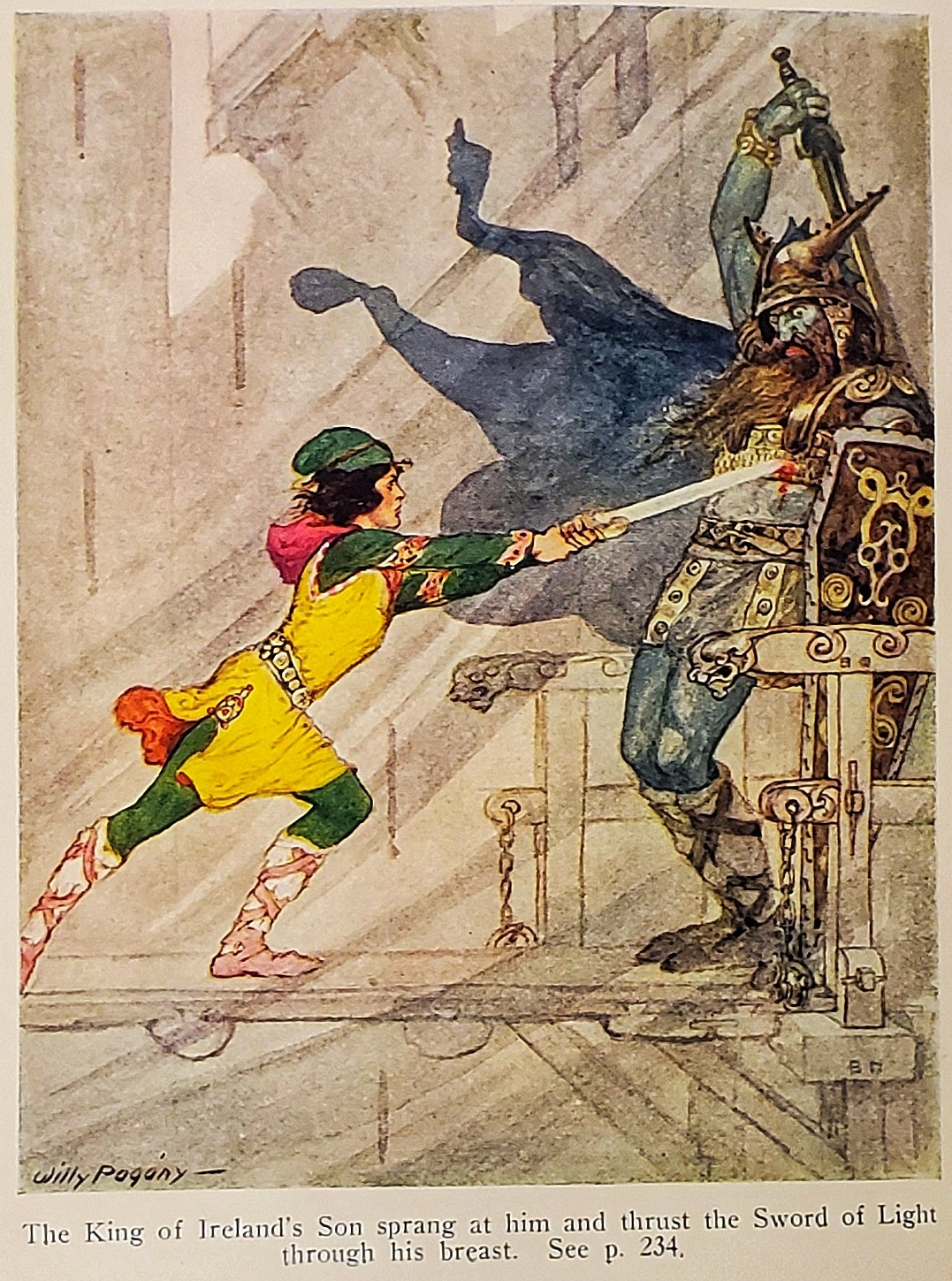
The King of Ireland's Son thrusts the sword of light. —Willy Pogany illustr., frontispiece of Padraic Colum, The King of Ireland's Son (1916).

Below are the lists of tales where the sword of light occurs. Kittredge's sigla (K J L C_{1} O'F H c m) are given in boldface: (Note: Kittredge listed eight "Irish versions" of the werewolf tale, 1) K 2) J 3) L 4) C_{1} 5) C_{2} 6) O'F 7) H 8) S. He refers to the eight versions collectively as I.) (Note: However, Kittredge's 5) C_{2} does not mention the sword of light. Nor 8) S ""How the Great Tuairisgeul was put to death", with Tuairisgeul glossed as 'Description, report, calumny', which is a Scottish version, which contrasts with J. F. Campbell's The Young King Of Easaidh Ruadh which features a "glaive of light". Instead, the hero barters his horse to obtain an old man (the werewolf himself), who turns out to be none other than "the Great Tuairisgeul".)

=== Irish folktales ===
- "The Story of the Sculloge's son from Muskerry (Sceal Vhic Scoloige)" (Kennedy (1866)) **K**
  - (in-tale) "Fios Fath an aon Sceil" (perfect narrative of the unique story)"
- "Adventure of the Sgolog and the Red" (GruagachEachtra air an sgolóig agus air an ngruagach ruadh) (Ó Briain (1889), Gaelic Journal) (Note: In Irish; this is another version of Kennedy's "Sculloge's son from Muskerry" or Larminie's "Morraha".) **J**
- "The Weaver's Son and the Giant of the White Hill", (Curtin (1890), Myths and Folk-lore of Ireland). (Note: Here it is the "sword of sharpness". Cf. footnote in A.C.L. Brown.)
- "The Thirteenth Son of the King of Erin" ( Curtin, Myths)
- Leaduidhe na luaithe ("Ashypet" or "The Lazy Fellow") (Ó Fotharta/O'Foharty/O'Faherty (1892)) (Note: Name half-anglicized as to "Domhnal O'Foharty" by William Rooney and anglicized "Donald O'Faherty" by Leland Duncan; Duncan also gave the English-translations of the book-title, story-titles, with summaries.) (Note: As for the Irish title, leaduidhe is glossed as a "person who is loath to leave the fireside", and na luaithe (genitive of luaith) signifies "of the ashes". Hiberno-English "leadaí na luatha" is literally 'lazybones of the ashes'. As Dasent notes, "ashypet" is a Scott English word listed in Jamieson's dictionary, and equivalent to Askefis (Askeladden) of the Norwegian Fairy Tales.)
- "Smallhead and the King's Sons" (Curtin (1892), repr. Jacobs (1894) No. XXXIX) (Note: Source stated as Curtin's tale published as "Hero Tales of Ireland", New York Sun. It was the 11 December 1892 issue of The Sun.)
- "Baranoir, son of a King in Erin, and the Daughter of King under the Wave" (Curtin (1893), repr. Ó Duilearga (1942) ed. Béaloideas **12** (1/2)) (Note: Assigned AT Type 507A "The Monster's Bride: The King of Greece's Daughter" and 531.)
- "Morraha; Brian More, son of the high-king of Erin, from the Well of Enchantments of Binn Edin" (Larminie (1893); repr. Jacobs (1894)) **L**
- "Simon and Margaret" (Larminie)
- "Beauty of the World" (Larminie)
- "The King who had Twelve Sons" (Larminie)
- "Cud, Cad, and Micad", (Curtin (1894), Hero-tales of Ireland). (Note: An Irish text "Cod, Cead agus Mícead" was given in An Seaḃac (1932), "Dhá Scéal ó Dhuibhneachaibh", Béaloideas Iml. 3, pp. 381–400. Where it is noted that the storyteller of Curtin's version was found and its Irish version transcribed by Seán Mac Giollarnáth.)
- "Coldfeet and Queen of Lonesome Island", (Curtin, Hero-tales)
- "Art and Balor Beimenach", (Curtin, Hero-tales). **C_{1}**
- "The Shining Sword and the Knowledge of the Cause of the One Story about Women" (O'Foharta (1897), ZCP **1**)) **O'F**
- "The King of Ireland's Son (Mac Righ Eireann )" (Hyde (1890), Beside the Fire) (Note: Summarized and analyzed for folk motives by James Mackillop, but in this version by Hyde version the hero's party obtains "the sword of the three edges" (Irish: cloidheamh na tri faobhar).)
  - Mac Rígh Eireann agus Ceann Gruagach na g-Cleasann "The king's son of Ireland and the chief-magician's with his tricks" ( (Note: French translation by Dottin is given, accompanying the Irish text.) Hyde (1899), No. XXIX, Annales de Bretagne ) **H**
  - "The Snow, Crow, and the Blood" (MacManus (1900)). (Note: Story-line closely follows Hyde's Mac Righ Eireann above.)
- An untitled tale of Finn's three sons by the Queen of Italy collected at Glenties in Donegal (Andrews (1919))
- An Claidheamh Soluis: agus Fios-fátha-'n-aoin-scéil "The Sword of Light and the knowledge of the motive of the unique (?) tale" (Ó Ceocháin (1928) in Béaloideas **1**).
- Mac Rí Chruacháin (Curtis (1929) in Béaloideas **2** (1)).
- Séarlus, Mac Rí na Frainnce (Ó Dubhda & An Seabhac (1929) in Béaloideas **2** (2)).
- Fios bhás an an-sgéalaidhe agus an Claidheamh Solais "Knowledge of death of the Ansgéalidhe (Storyteller) and the Sword of Light" ( (Note: Ó Cillín joins "an-sgéalaidhe" into an unhyphenated name "Ansgéalidhe (?)", but sgéalaidhe appears to signify "storyteller".)Ó Cillín (1933) in Béaloideas **4**). (Note: Told by Pádraig Ó Loingsigh of Bailén tSlé in Ventry parish, who was a storyteller for Curtin.)

=== Scottish Gaelic folktales ===
The publication of tales from the Highlands (Campbell (1860), Popular Tales of the West Highlands) predate the Irish tales becoming available in print.

- "The Young King Of Easaidh Ruadh" ("Rìgh òg Easaidh Ruadh") (Campbell (1860), No. 1) **c**
- "Widow's Son" (Campbell, No. 2, 2nd variant)
- "Tale of Conal Crovi" (Campbell, No. 6)
- "Tale of Connal" (Campbell, No. 7)
- "Maol a' Chliobain" (Campbell, No. 17)
- "The Widow and her Daughters" (Campbell, No. 41, 2nd variant)
- "Mac Iain Dìreach" (Campbell, No. 46)
- "An Sionnach, the Fox" (Campbell, No. 46, 4th variant;)
- "The Herding of Cruachan (Buachaillechd Chruachain)" (MacInnes (1890), No. 4.) **m**
- "The History of Kitty Ill-Pretts" (Bruford & MacDonald (1994), No. 21)

== Commentary ==
The sword of light (or glaive of light) is a trope artefact that occurs in a number of Gaelic tales. It also occurs in Irish folktales also, as described below. The "Quest for sword of light" (H1337) motif is also listed in Stith Thompson's Motif-Index of Folk-Literature.

=== Grouping ===
One strand of the "sword of light" tale has been transmitted in French Canada as the tale of the "Sword of Wisdom", and assigned type 305A. However, the Irish cognate had not been catalogued as a tale type by Aarne-Thompson, though recognized in The Types of the Irish Folktale. (Note: Seán Ó Súilleabháin and Reidar Thoralf Christiansen edd.)

==== One Story and Werewolf's Tale ====
The quest for the sword of light is an added layer, attached to the core tale of the quest for "the one story", (Note: Kittredge uses "the one story" once Kittredge (1903), pp. 263 but generally adheres to "the cause of the one story about women"; "The Only Story" (Irish: An t-A on-Scéal) is given by Properly, "the cause of the one story about women".) which forms a frame story to the Irish versions of the medieval werewolf tale, according to George Lyman Kittredge's 1903 study.

"The one story" is actually shorthand, and Kittredge generally uses "the cause of the one story about women", as occurs in O'Foharta's version. Similar titles or sub-titles occur in Irish as well. The form "news of the death of Anshgayliacht" in "Morraha", is deemed to be a corruption.

The werewolf tale, recounted by a man who had once been magically transformed into a wolf by an unfaithful wife, is analyzed by Kittredge for its compound structure, but the in-tale generally does not concern the Sword of Light. (Note: Kittredge analyzes the in-tale (framed tale) of werewolf as containing a lengthy Defence of the Child interpolation, which is in itself a composite consisting of a Faithful Dog tale fused with what he calls the Skilful Companions and The Hand and the Child tale types. The Hand and the Child tale has the motif of a grasping hand that seizes the victim, which gets cut off in some cases, akin to Grendel's arm in Beowulf.)

It is pointed out that in the sword of light fails to occur in the Scottish version of the werewolf tale, replaced by the hero obtaining custody of the werewolf himself, by bartering his horse. (Note: Also, the wife is replaced by a stepmother in the Scotch variant S.)

==== Quasi-bridal quest ====
Some tales fall into an actual bridal-quest pattern. In "The Thirteenth Son of the King of Erin", Sean Ruadh (actually the eldest prince) is assisted by the princess who is his would-be bride in slaying the urfeist (sea-serpent). And in the "Widow's Son", the hero promises marriage to the giant's daughter, who also becomes the hero's helper.

Josef Baudiš suggested a slightly different grouping, which similar to the bridal-quest type but distinguishably different: the hero wins a beautiful wife (and riches) as wager in a game played against a gruagach (wizard-champion) figure, but it is a trap, and when the hero suffers a loss, he is compelled to go on a quest, usually for the sword of light. (Note: The motif is H942 "Tasks assigned as payment of gambling".) (Note: Baudiš was examining parallels to Tochmarc Emire.)

=== Helpful animals ===
Kittredge has recognized the presence of "helpful animals" assisting the hero in the tales, catalogued in the range of Types B300–590, "Helpful Animals" in Thompson's Motif-Index. (Note: Thompson, Stith Motif-Index 1: 422–460: Types B300–590, "Helpful Animals", apud Kete.) Kittedge recognizes the Skilful Companions motif in the werewolf in-story, but that portion does not much concern the sword, as aforementioned. (Note: Kittredge defers to Theodor Benfey who performed a study of parallel tales known to be widespread all over the world.)

In O'Foharta's Irish text (O'F) the helpers are a hawk, otter, and a fox ("Hawk of the Grey Wood", the "Otter of the Endless Tempests", and the "Fox of the Pleasant Crag"). In Campbell's Scottish The Young King of Easaidh Ruadh (c text), the helpers are a dog, hawk, and an otter ("slim dog of the greenwood", "hoary hawk of the grey rock", and "brown otter of the river"). (Note: Cf. Campbell's Introduction of re suggestion to translated "slim dog" as "lion" or "greyhound".) In McInnes's Scottish version (m text) there are not three, but four animals.

It might be noted that Irish bridal quest of the "giant's daughter" type (Note: Which Josef Baudiš recognized as being similar to the sword of light tales) is recognized as an equivalent to folktale to the Six Go through the Whole World type (ATU 513A), and this type features "magical helpers" or "extraordinary helpers".

=== The secret about women ===
In the Irish folktale, the hero goes on quest for ' The Only Story' (Irish: An t-Aon Scéal) which is thought to mean ' truth about women '. That meaning is illuminated in versions that provide a more fuller title, e. g., "The Shining Sword and the Knowledge of the Cause of the One Story about Women", (Note: Kennedy's title is partly identical to O'Foharta's title, but Kennedy's translation is inaccurate according to Kittredge.) (Note: Cf. "Fios-fáh-an-oyn-scéil (the knowledge of the motive of the unique(?) tale)" given in Ó Ceocháin (1928), An Claiḋeaṁ Soluis: agus Fios-fáṫa-'n-aoin-scéil, summary in English, p. 281.) This has been corrupted to "news of the death of Anshgayliacht" in the L (Larminie) version.

Kittredge considered the "secret about women" element to be an essential and original part of the Irish story, as seen in the stemma of texts given by him, (Note: The "secret about women" being found also in the Latin G text (Arthur and Gorlagon) his assumption is it was also found in their common ancestor y.) even though the "woman" part of it has been lost in some variants, such as Kennedy's Fios Fath an aon Sceil ("perfect narrative of the unique story")

A more familiar Arthurian tale perhaps than Arthur and Gorlagon which embeds the quest of "What is it that women most desire?" is The Wedding of Sir Gawain and Dame Ragnelle.

=== External soul motif ===
The external soul motif in Sword of Light stories have been noted for example by Gerard Murphy.

The tale "The Young King Of Easaidh Ruadh" was also given as a typical example of "External soul" motif (E 710) by folklorist Katharine Mary Briggs. It has been pointed out that the Easaidh Ruadh refers to a place name in Ireland, probably the Assaroe Falls in Ballyshannon, County Donegal.

The AT 302 "The Giant Whose Heart Was In an Egg" that exhibits this external soul motif applies to some of the tales

A similar Irish tale involving the "external soul" is the Donegal tale "Hung up Naked Man" (Note: Irish: An Crochaire Tarrnochtuighthe; alternate Irish title: "Éamonn Ua Ciórrthais(?)" ed. E. C. Quiggin),) or "The Bare-stripping Hangman" (Note: S. Douglas calls it "The Bare-stripping Hangman" and names it alongside the sword of light tale "The Weaver's Son and the Giant of the White Hill"." as two tales of "external soul" type.) studied at length by Roger Sherman Loomis (1927). While Loomis does not explicitly state a connection to the sword of light, he remarks that there is parallel to the Irish giant Cú roí, whose death-tale Aided Chon Roí is of the external soul type, involving the destruction of a golden apple or ball to kill him, as revealed by Cú roí's abducted and forced wife Blaíthíne, and Loomis describes Cú roí a "solar host" or "solar divinity", noting further that Cú roí could only be "slain with his own sword". In T. F. O'Rahilly's conception (cf. § As a mythological sword below), this Cú roí is just one of the names of the Otherworldly God (often a sun god), to be opposed by the Divine Hero (most prominently Cúchulainn) who carries, in later story-telling, the "Claidheamh soluis of [Ireland's] halfpenny postage-stamps" (cf. top image).

=== Three attempts ===
In the specimen collected by Kennedy, the hero is assisted by the king who is his own father-in-law, who happens to be the brother of the sword owner, and the hero's antagonist, the Druid demanding the sword.

The Sculloge's rides forth to the dwelling of the sword owner three times, his horse being hacked by the sword in the first two tries, but succeeding on the third. The three time's the charm element that occurs here is also present in the Morraha tale collected by Larminie.

=== As a mythological sword ===
The assertion has been made that Claidheamh Soluis is "a symbol of Ireland attributed in oral tradition to Cúchulainn" (James Mackillop), although none of the tales listed above name Cuchulainn as protagonist. T. F. O'Rahilly only went as far as to suggests that the "sword of light" in folk tales was a vestige of divine weapons and heroic weapons, such as Cúchulainn's shining sword Cruaidín Catutchenn, whose name means 'the Hard-headed Steeling'. This sword (a.k.a. "Socht's sword") is said to have "shone at night like a candle" according to a version of Echtrae Cormaic ("Adventures of Cormac mac Airt").

In T. F. O'Rahilly's schema, roughly speaking, the primeval divine weapon was a fiery and bright lightning weapon, most often conceived of as a throwing spear; in later traditions, the wielder would change from god to hero, and spear tended to be replaced by sword. From the heroic cycles, some prominent examples are Fergus Mac Roigh's sword Caladbolg and Mac Cecht's spear. But Caladbolg does not manifest as a blazing sword, and the latter which does emit fiery sparks is a spear, thus failing to fit the profile of a sword which shines. One example which does fit, is Cúchulainn's sword Cruaidín Catutchenn which was aforementioned. And the legacy of these mythological and heroic weapons (Lug's lighting-weapon, his "son" Cúchulainn's remarkable sword, etc. ) survive in the "sword of light" in folklore.

=== Connection to Arthuriana ===
A broad sweeping parallel has been made between the light or lightning weapons of Celtic tradition and King Arthur's Excalibur, described as brightly shining in several places of the Vulgate cycle Roman de Merlin. (Note: Citing Roman de Merlin, ed. H. Oskar Sommer 1894, p. 99, p. 24) Similar passages obviously occur in Thomas Malory's Le Morte d'Arthur, which draws from the Vulgate Cycle as a source. (Note: "thenne he drewe his swerd Excalibur, but it was so breyght in his enemyes eyen that it gaf light lyke thirty torchys.")

Wounding by one's own sword

A more precise parallel which has been argued is that just as the sword of light in Irish and Scottish folktales contain a "(fatal) wounding by one's own sword" motif, the Arthurian cycle contains an episode where Arthur is imperiled by his own sword, Excalibur. In the Huth Merlin, Morgan le Fay plots to have Arthur killed with his own Excalibur, by stealing the sword for her lover Accalon, who unbeknownst fights his lord King Arthur with it. The Lady of the Lake intercedes at the right moment to prevent Arthur's death. The episode has been copied by Malory as well (with the knight being called Accolon unlike the French original)

Sleeping giant

Dáithí Ó hÓgáin deduces that certain properties of the sword of light (such as screaming when touched in order to alert its owner) is likely borrowed from Arthurian material, because there is evidence that a version of Fios Fatha an Aonsceil ('the knowledge of the cause of the One Story') had been told about Gearóid Iarla (Earl Gerald FitzGerald) of the 14th century, whose family had close ties with Arthurian tradition. To the Earl is attached a Barbarossa legend (King asleep in mountain motif), which makes the figure conducive to be transformed into a "sleeping giant" of folktale.

Grail sword

Other commentators have equated the Sword of Light to the Grail sword. Loomis also suggested that the sword obtained by Cei (Sir Kay) in the Welsh tale Culhwch and Olwen (i.e., the sword of Gwrnach the giant) must be "related to the sword of light which is the object of the Irish and Scottish folk-tales".

== See also ==
- Flaming sword (mythology)
- Lugh's spear
- Lúin of Celtchar
- Irish mythology in popular culture
- Four Treasures of the Tuatha Dé Danann
- Nuada Airgetlám

== Bibliography ==
=== Irish or Scottish Gaelic texts, some with translations ===
- Campbell, J. F. (1860), Popular Tales of the West Highlands (in Scottish Gaelic), Edinburgh: Edmonston and Douglas Vol. I Vol. II)
- Curtis, Edmund (June 1929), "Mac Rí Chruacháin", Béaloideas (in Irish and English), 2 (1): 35–46, doi:10.2307/20521535, JSTOR 20521535
- MacInnes, D[onald] (1890), "Buachaillechd Chruachain" [The herding of Cruachan], Folk and Hero Tales, Waifs and Strays of Celtic Tradition. Argyllshire Series No. 11 (in Scottish Gaelic), Alfred Trübner Nutt (notes), Publications of the Folk-lore society, pp. 95–125
- Ó Ceocháin, Domhnall (June 1928), "An Claiḋeaṁ Soluis: agus Fios-fáṫa-'n-aoin-scéil", Béaloideas (in Irish), 1 (3): 276–282, doi:10.2307/20521487, JSTOR 20521487
- Ó Cillín, Tomás (1933), "An Claiḋeaṁ Soluis: agus Fios-fáṫa-'n-aoin-scéil", Béaloideas (in Irish), 4 (2): 155–163, doi:10.2307/20521787, JSTOR 20521787
- O'Foharta, Daniel (1897), "An Cloidheamh Soluis Agus Fios Fáth an Aon Sgeil ar na Mnáibh" [The Shining Sword and the Knowledge of the Cause of the One Story about Women], Zeitschrift für Celtische Philologie, 1: 477–492, doi:10.1515/zcph.1897.1.1.477, S2CID 202550923
- Ó Dubhda, Seán; An Seabhac (1929), "Séarlus, Mac Rí na Frainnce", Béaloideas (in Irish and English), 2 (2): 122–137, doi:10.2307/20521567, JSTOR 20521567

=== Translations or tales collected in English ===
- Bruford, Alan J.; MacDonald, Donald A., eds. (1994), "The History of Kitty Ill-Pretts", Scottish Traditional Tales, Edinburgh: Polygon, pp. 185–190
- Curtin, Jeremiah, ed. (1890), Myths and Folk-Lore of Ireland, Boston: Little, Brown, ISBN 978-0-8103-3546-2
- Curtin, Jeremiah, ed. (1894), Hero-tales of Ireland, Boston: Little, Brown, pp. 198–222, 242–261, 312–334, ISBN 978-1-4047-2499-0
- Jacobs, Joseph, ed. (1894), More Celtic Fairy Tales, pp. 80–96, 135–155, archived from the original on 8 October 2015 (wikisource: More_Celtic_Fairy_Tales)
- Kennedy, Patrick, ed. (1866), Legendary Fictions of the Irish Celts, London: Macmillan and Co.
- Larminie, William (1893), West Irish Folk-Tales and Romances, London: Elliot Stock; text via Internet Archive

=== Critical studies ===
- Milne, F. A.; Nutt, A. Nutt (25 March 1904), "Arthur and Gorlagon", Folklore, 15 (Folklore): 40–67, doi:10.1080/0015587X.1904.9719384, JSTOR 1254552
- Baudiš, Josef [in Czech] (1921–1923), "On Tochmarc Emere", Ériu, 9: 98–108, JSTOR 30007915
- Briggs, Katharine Mary (1976), "Separable Soul, or external soul", An Encyclopedia of Fairies: Hobgoblins, Brownies, Bogies, and Other Supernatural Creaturest, Pantheon Books, pp. 356–357, ISBN 978-0-394-73467-5
- Bruford, Alan (1966), "Gaelic Folk-Tales and Mediæval Romances: A Study of the Early Modern Irish 'Romantic Tales' and Their Oral Derivatives", Béaloideas, 34: i–v, 1–165, 167–285, doi:10.2307/20521320, JSTOR 20521320
- Kittredge, G. L. (1903), Arthur and Gorlagon, Studies and Notes in Philology and Literature, vol. 8, Harvard University, pp. 150–275
- Krappe, A. Haggerty (April 1933), "Arthur and Gorlagon", Speculum, 8 (2): 209–222, doi:10.2307/2846751, JSTOR 2846751, S2CID 161250408
- Loomis, Roger Sherman (1927). Celtic Myth and Arthurian Romance. New York: Columbia University Press. Archived from the original on 26 January 2023.
- Ó hÓgáin, Dáithí (1991), "'Has the Time Come?' (MLSIT 8009): The Barbarossa Legend in Ireland and Its Historical Background", Béaloideas, Iml. 59: 197–207, doi:10.2307/20522387, JSTOR 20522387
- O'Rahilly, T. F. (1946), Early Irish History and Mythology (snippet), Dublin: Dublin Institute for Advanced Studies
- Puhvel, Martin (1972), "The Deicidal Otherworld Weapon in Celtic and Germanic Mythic Tradition", Folklore, 83 (2): 210–219, doi:10.1080/0015587X.1972.9716470, JSTOR 1259546

=== Popularized versions ===
- Campbell, J. F. (1891). The Celtic Dragon Myth. Translated by George Henderson. pp. 33ff., a composite retelling.
- MacManus, Seumas (1900), Donegal Fairy Stories, New York: McClure, Phillips & Co, pp. 157–174
