= Town Musicians of Bremen =

German fairy tale

Coordinates: 53.076181°N 8.807528°E

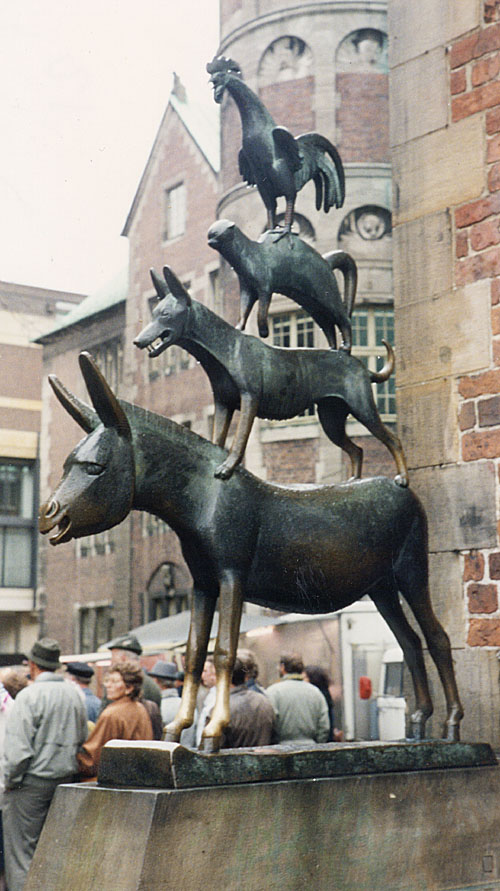
- A bronze statue by Gerhard Marcks depicting the Bremen Town Musicians located in Bremen, Germany. The statue was erected in 1953.

Folk tale
- Name: Town Musicians of Bremen
- Aarne–Thompson grouping: ATU 130 (The Animals in Night Quarters)
- Country: Germany
- Origin Date: 1812
- Published in: Grimms' Fairy Tales

The "Town Musicians of Bremen" (German: Die Bremer Stadtmusikanten) is a German fairy tale collected by the Brothers Grimm and published in Grimms' Fairy Tales in 1819 (KHM 27).

It tells the story of four ageing domestic animals, who after a lifetime of hard work are neglected, mistreated and marked for death by their former masters. Eventually, they decide to run away and become town musicians in the city of Bremen. Contrary to the story's title, the characters never arrive in Bremen, as they succeed in tricking and scaring off a band of robbers, capturing their spoils, and moving into their house. It is a story of Aarne–Thompson Type 130 ("Outcast animals find a new home").

== Origin ==
The Brothers Grimm first published this tale in the second edition of Kinder- und Hausmärchen in 1819, based on the account of the German storyteller Dorothea Viehmann (1755–1815).

== Synopsis ==
In the story, a donkey, a dog, a cat, and a rooster, all past their prime years in life and usefulness on their respective farms, are soon to be discarded, mistreated or killed by their masters. One by one, they leave their homes and set out together. They decide to go to Bremen, known for its freedom, to live without owners and become musicians there.

On the way to Bremen, they find a cottage with light in the windows. Inside, they see three robbers enjoying their ill-gotten gains. Standing on each other's backs, they decide to perform their first song. However, the men run away in fright, not knowing what the strange sound is. The animals take possession of the house, have a good meal, and settle in for the evening. The donkey sleeps outside, the dog by the door, the cat on the mantle and the rooster in the loft.

Later that night, the robbers return, determined to get the cottage back. Thinking whatever scared them left, they decide to send one of them to go back and check. He sees the cat's eyes shining in the darkness and reaches over, thinking they are the coals of the fire, so he can light a candle. Things happen in quick succession; the cat scratches his face with its claws, the dog bites him on the leg, the donkey kicks him with his hooves, and the rooster crows in his ear. The terrified robber tells his companions that he was beset by a horrible witch who had scratched him with her long fingernails (the cat), a monster who stabbed him with a knife (the dog), a giant who had hit him with a club (the donkey), and a judge calling out from the rooftop (the rooster). Horrified, the robbers abandon the cottage, where the animals live happily for the rest of their days, deciding not to go to Bremen after all.

== Variants ==
In the original version of this story, which dates from the 12th century, the robbers are a brown bear, a lion, and a grey wolf, all animals featured in heraldic devices. When the donkey and his friends arrive in Bremen, the townsfolk applaud them for having rid the district of the terrible beasts.

In another variant, the animals' master(s) have been deprived of their livelihood by the thief, who stole their money or destroyed their farm or mill, and therefore sent the animals away, unable to care for them any longer. After the animals dispatch the thieves, they return the stolen wealth back to their master so that they can rebuild.

Other versions involve at least one undomesticated animal, such as a lizard, helping the domestic animals out in dispatching the thieves.

== Analysis ==
=== Tale type ===
The tale is classified in the international Aarne-Thompson-Uther Index as type ATU 130, "The Animals in Night Quarters (Bremen Town Musicians)". Folklorists Stith Thompson and Barre Toelken see a deep relation between this type and type ATU 210, "Cock (Rooster), Hen, Duck, Pin, and Needle on a Journey".

Folklorist Antti Aarne proposed an Asian origin for the tale type ATU 130, "Die Tiere auf der Wanderschaft" ("Wandering Animals and Objects").

French folklorist Paul Delarue identified two forms of the tale type: a Western one, wherein the animals in exile are always domestic animals (represented by Grimm's tale), and an Eastern one, wherein the characters are "inferior animals". This second form is popular in Japan, China, Korea, Melanesia and Indonesia.

=== Similar stories ===
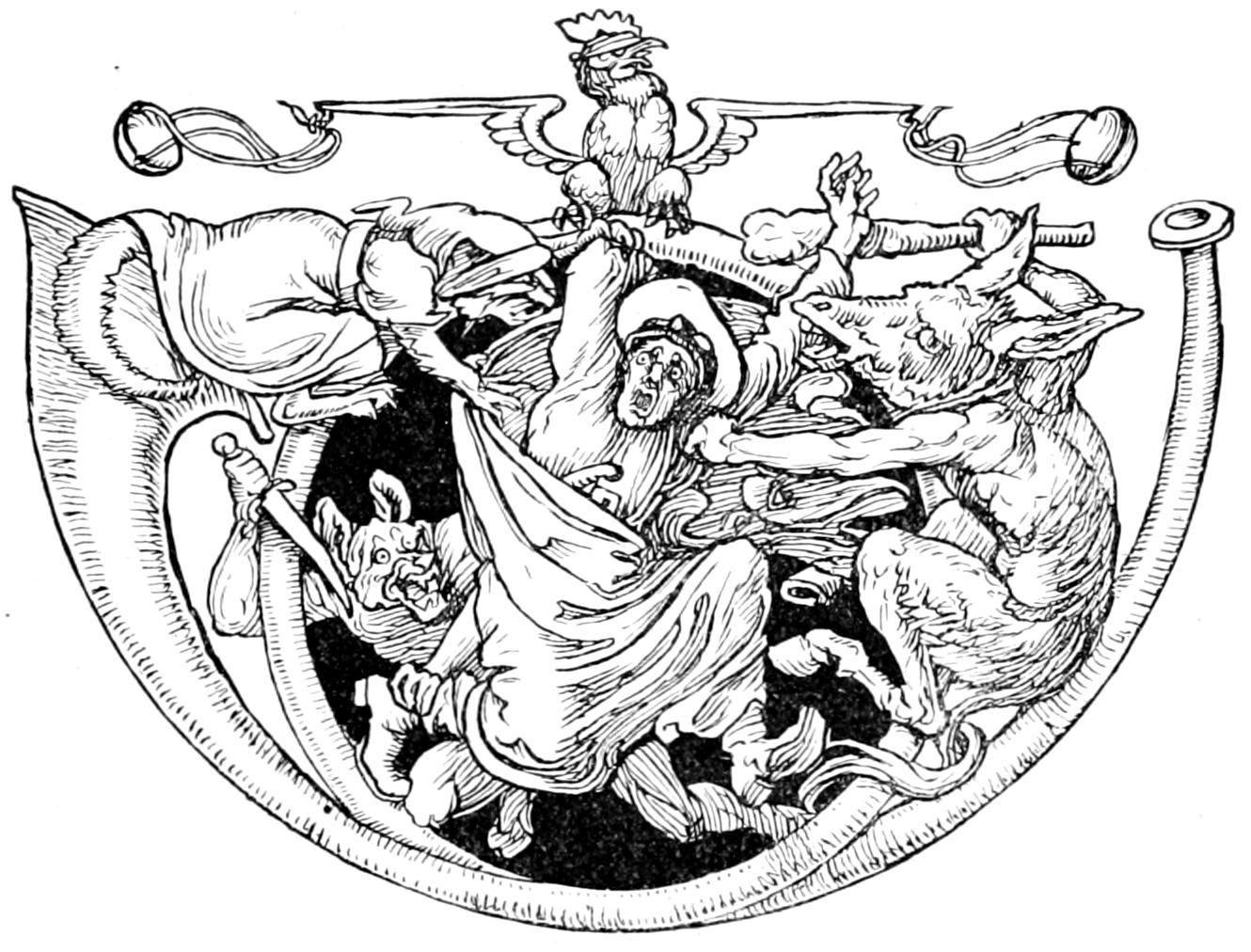
Illustration by Walter Crane

The story is similar to other AT-130 tales like the German/Swiss "The Robber and the Farm Animals", the Norwegian "The Sheep and the Pig Who Set Up House", the Finnish "The Animals and the Devil", the Flemish "The Choristers of St. Gudule", the Scottish "The Story of the White Pet", the English "The Bull, the Tup, the Cock, and the Steg", the Irish "Jack and His Comrades", the Spanish "Benibaire", the American "How Jack Went to Seek His Fortune" and "The Dog, the Cat, the Ass, and the Cock", and the South African "The World's Reward".

Joseph Jacobs also cited this as a parallel version of the Irish "Jack and His Comrades", and the English "How Jack went to seek his fortune". Variants also appears in American folktale collections, and in Scottish Traveller repertoires.

== See also ==
- Jack and His Comrades (Irish fairy tale collected by Joseph Jacobs)
- Ub Iwerks' ComiColor Cartoon The Bremen Town Musicians (1935 film)
- The Bremen Town Musicians (1969 Soviet musical cartoon)
- The Four harmonious animals - one of the Jātaka tales in Buddhist mythology

== Bibliography ==
- Boggs, Ralph Steele. Index of Spanish folktales, classified according to Antti Aarne's "Types of the folktale." Chicago: University of Chicago. 1930. p. 33.
- Bolte, Johannes, Polívka, Jiri. Anmerkungen zu den Kinder- u. hausmärchen der brüder Grimm. Erster Band (NR. 1-60). Germany, Leipzig: Dieterich'sche Verlagsbuchhandlung. 1913. pp. 237–259.
- "Children's Stories in Sculpture: Bremen Town Musicians in Bremen." The Elementary School Journal 64, no. 5 (1964): pp. 246–47. www.jstor.org/stable/999783.
