= Four harmonious animals =

Story in Buddhist traditions, especially South Asian

Information
- Religion: Buddhism
- Language: Pāli, Sanskrit, Tibetic languages
- Sutras: In Vinaya texts and Jātaka collections of many Buddhist canons

The tale of the four harmonious animals, four harmonious friends or four harmonious brothers (Standard Tibetan: མཐུན་པ་སྤུན་བཞི།) (Wylie: mthun pa spun bzhi or Wylie: mthun pa rnam bzhi) is one of the Jātaka tales, part of Buddhist mythology, and is often the subject in works of Bhutanese and Tibetan art. It is perhaps the most common theme in Bhutanese folk art, featuring on many temple murals, stupas, and as a decorative pattern on many daily utensils. It is the best-known national folktale of Bhutan and is popular in Tibet and Mongolia: it is widely referred to in these cultures.

== Outline of story ==
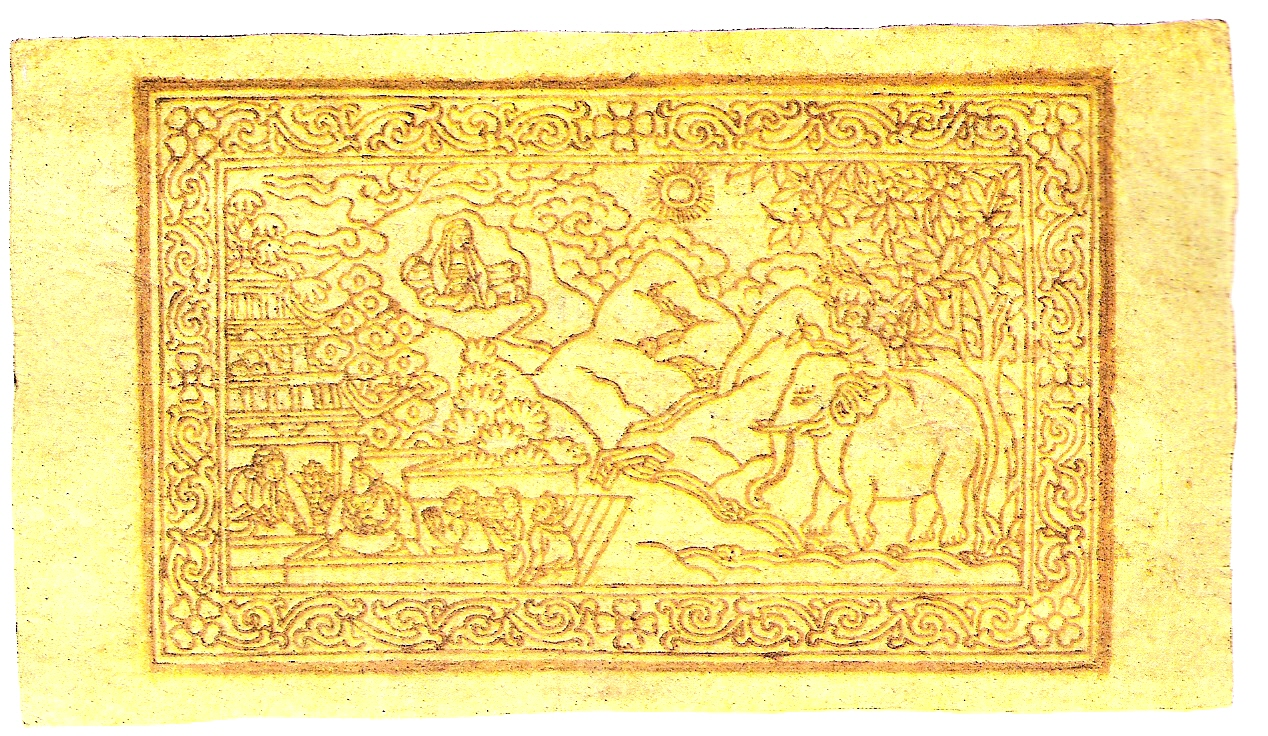
Backside of Tibetan 25 tam banknote, dated 1659 of the Tibetan Era (= 1913 CE). On the right, the four harmonious animals are represented.

A popular scene often found as wall paintings in Tibetan religious buildings represents an elephant standing under a fruit tree carrying a monkey, a hare and a bird (usually a partridge, but sometimes a grouse, and in Bhutan a hornbill) on top of each other. The scene refers to a legend which tells that four animals were trying to find out who was the oldest. The elephant said that the tree was already fully grown when he was young, the monkey that the tree was small when he was young, the hare that he saw the tree as a sapling when he was young and the bird claimed that he had excreted the seed from which the tree grew. So the bird was recognized by the other animals as the oldest, and the four animals lived together in co-dependence and cooperation, helping each other to enjoy the fruits of the tree. After the story is finished, it is revealed the partridge was the Buddha in a previous life. The story was meant as an illustration of cooperation and respect for seniority, and was told by the Buddha after some of his students had failed to pay due respect to the senior disciple Śāriputra. Sometimes the tale also describes the animals upholding the five precepts and teaching them to others. One of the oldest extant forms of the story is the Pāli version, called the Tittira Jataka.

== Themes ==
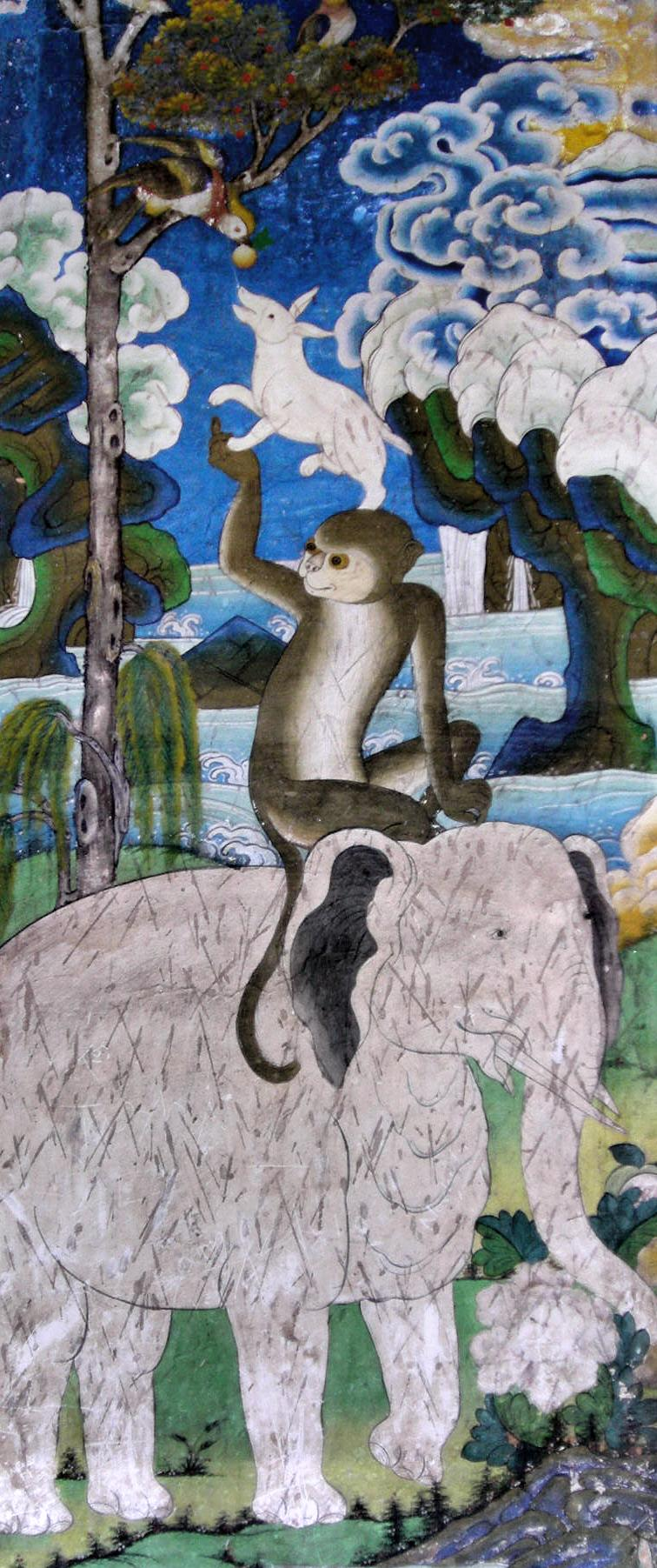
Wall painting, Sikkim

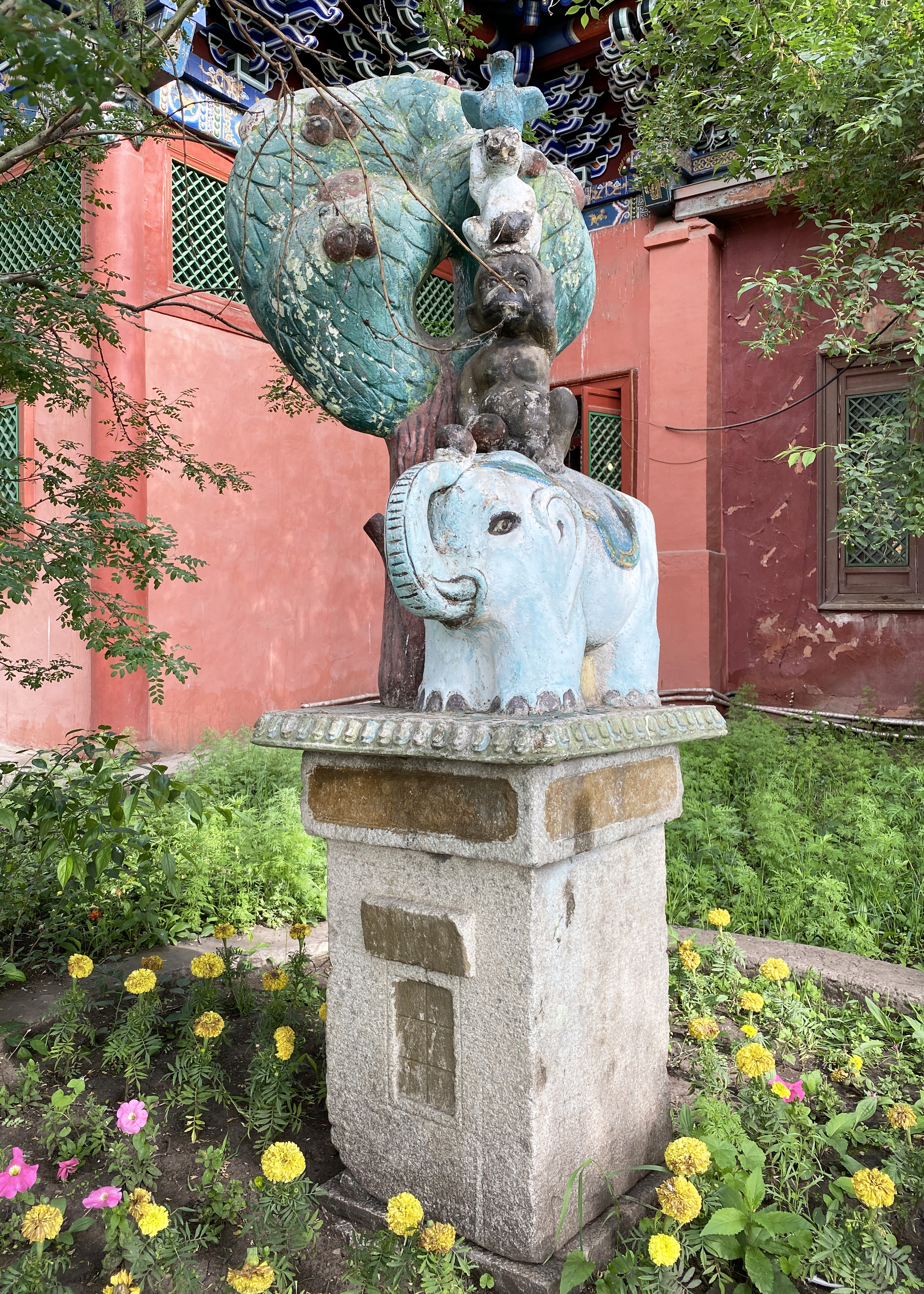
Sculpture at Gandantegchinlen Monastery in Mongolia

Communal harmony and respect for seniority are the main moral of the story. Such respect stands in contrast with a pecking-order according to strength, size and power: it is the partridge which is most respected, not the elephant. Although the Buddha did sometimes downplay the value of respecting older people merely for their age, in this story he illustrates that a senior person should nonetheless be respected for their experience, because, as Tachibana points out, "the maturity of age is generally the sign of much experience". However, the story led to the establishment of several rules of conduct with regard to respect for seniority in the context of the monastic life, in which the number of years ordained as a monk (Sanskrit: bhikṣu; Pali: bhikkhu) is measured, rather than age. Buddhist monk Thanissaro Bhikkhu explains the relation between respect for seniority and harmony, drawing from the story: "A hierarchy based on seniority, however, is both objective and, in the long run, less oppressive: one's place in the hierarchy is not a measure of one's worth. Such a hierarchy also discourages the pride and competition that would come if bhikkhus could fight their way up the hierarchy by outdoing the measurable merit of others."

The four animals represent the different habitats of the animal world—the sky, the trees, the ground, and underground. The partridge assumes the role of the most senior animal: in pre-modern India, the partridge was highly regarded for its intelligence and understanding of language. The excreting of the seed of the tree is relevant, because some Indian trees are believed to only sprout when the seed is excreted by a bird, thus further amplifying the concept of cooperation and mutual dependence. The image of the animals standing on each other's shoulders, on the back of a patient elephant, also portrays social and environmental harmony: the bird finds a seed and plants it, then the rabbit waters it, and the monkey fertilizes it. Once the seed sprouts and begins to grow, the elephant protects it. After some time, the small plant grows into a big, beautiful tree full of healthy fruit. By working together and using their individual talents, the four friends are able to reach and enjoy the fruit.

== Origins ==
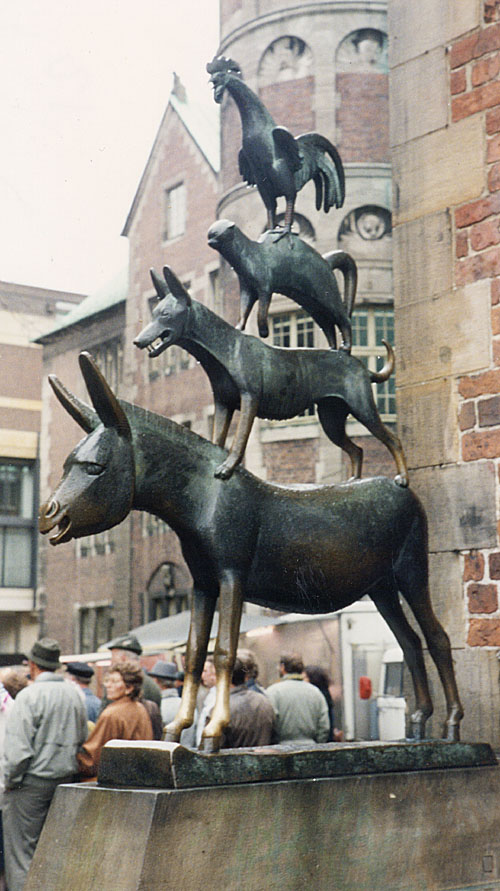
A bronze statue by Gerhard Marcks depicting the "Town Musicians of Bremen".

The primary source for the Buddhist legend of the four harmonious brothers is the Vinayavastu (Wylie: 'dul ba'i gzhi), which forms the first section of the Kangyur, the canon of Tibetan Buddhism. In canons of other Buddhist traditions, such as in the Pāli Canon of Theravāda Buddhism, and in the texts of the Mahāsāṃghika, Mūla-Sarvāstivāda and Sarvāstivāda orders, almost the same Jātaka tale is found in the Vinaya and Jātaka collections. The Dharmaguptaka and Mahīśāsaka orders did not consider the story part of the Jātaka, however, and only included it in their Vinayas. Bhikkhu Analayo believes that the story originally was not considered a previous life of the Buddha, but a didactic parable taught by the Buddha.

== Similar motifs worldwide ==
Old Irish scholar Eleanor Hull has pointed out that the story may reveal a custom of the ancient world to determine the date based on the life spans of different animals. Stories dealing with the question which animal lives the longest are found throughout the world. Most versions of the story usually feature three animals, as indeed, the Pali and Chinese versions of the Jātaka do. As for the fourth animal not present in the Pāli version, the hare—it was included in later versions.

A similar story was made famous when the Brothers Grimm included it in their collection of folk tales, as the "Town Musicians of Bremen".
