= The Red Ettin =

Fairy tale

The Red Ettin or The Red Etin is a fairy tale collected by Joseph Jacobs. It was included by Andrew Lang in The Blue Fairy Book.

== Synopsis ==
Two widows lived in a hut, and one had two sons and the other had one—or a single widow had three sons. One day the eldest son was told by his mother to fetch water for a cake, because it was time for him to seek his fortune, and the cake was all she could give him. The can was broken, the water he brought back little, and so the cake was small. The mother offered him all of it with her curse, or half with her blessing, and he took the whole. He left behind a knife, and said if the blade grew rusty, he was dead.

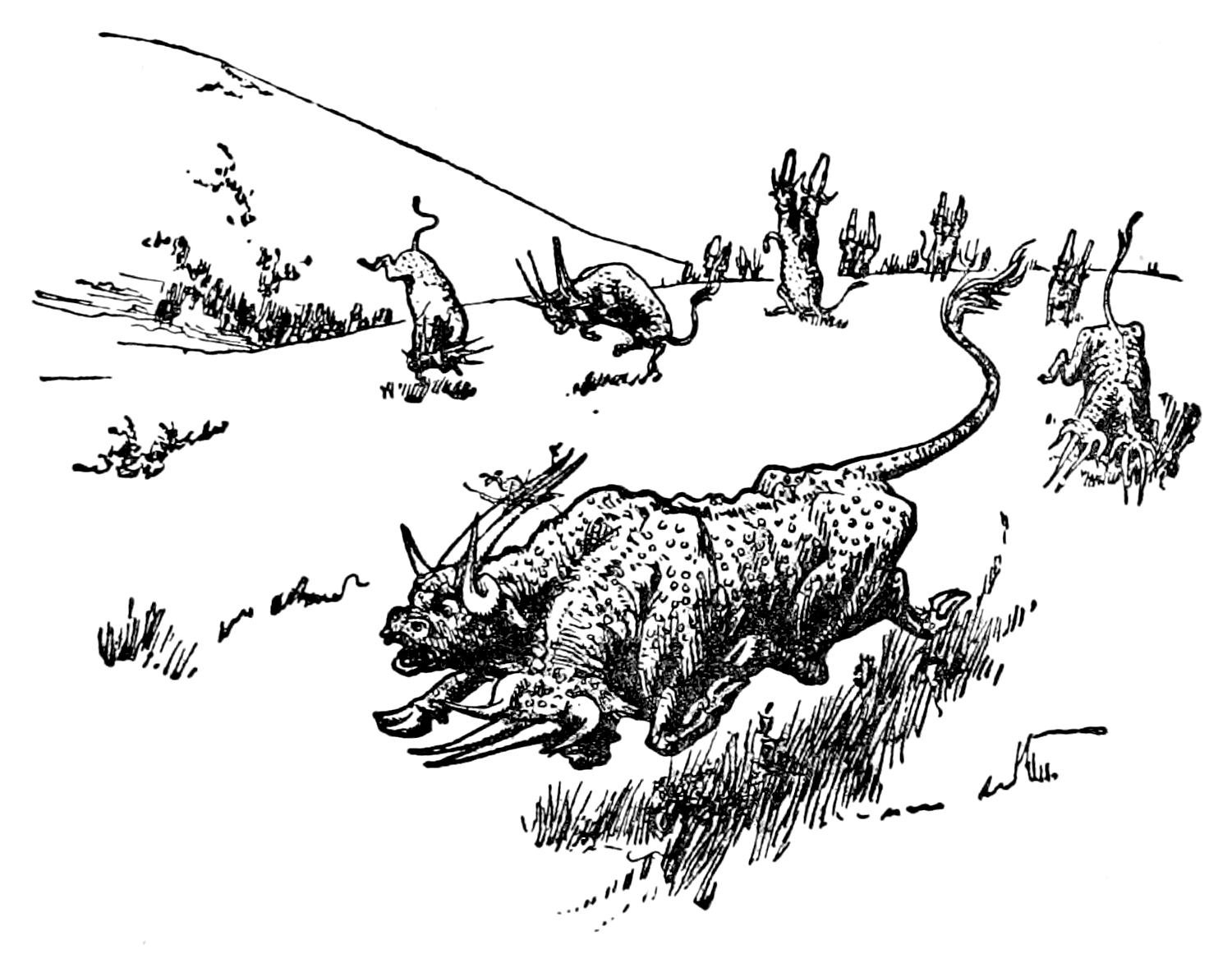
Illustration from Jacobs's version by John D. Batten

He met a shepherd, a swineherd, and a goatherd; each of the three told him the Red Ettin of Ireland had kidnapped the king of Scotland's daughter, but that he was not the man to rescue her. The shepherd also told him to be wary of the beasts he would meet next. They each had two heads, with four horns on each head, and the man fled them and hid in a castle. An old woman told him that it was the castle of the Red Ettin, who had three heads, and he should leave, but he begged her to hide him as best she could, for fear of the beasts.

The Red Ettin returned, soon found him, and asked him three riddles; when he could answer none of them, the Ettin turned him to stone. At home, his knife grew rusty. In the variants with three sons, the younger brother went after the elder, and met the same fate. The youngest son, or the son of the other widow, set out after him, or them. First, a raven called over his head to look out as he brought the water, and so he patched up the holes and brought back enough water for a large cake. Then he left half with his mother for her blessing.

He met an old woman on the way who asked for a piece of his cake, and he gave it to her. She, being a fairy, gave him a magical wand and a great deal of advice on what to do, and vanished. The shepherd, swineherd, and goatherd told him of the Red Ettin and the king of Scotland's daughter, and said that he was the man to defeat him. He walked boldly through the beasts to the castle, striking one dead with the wand, and stayed at the castle.

The Red Ettin asked him his riddle, but the man answered it correctly and was thus able to cut off the Ettin's three heads. He then restored his petrified brother/brothers to life and freed the women whom the Red Ettin had held prisoner. Soon afterward he was rewarded by the king with his daughter’s hand in marriage.

== Commentary ==
Joseph Jacobs collected a version with the three men, but suppressed one because it was repetitious. Andrew Lang included all three young men.

The word etin or ettin is related to Germanic Jötunn.

The incident of the life token is also present in variants of the Aarne–Thompson–Uther tale type ATU 303, "The Twins or Blood Brothers".

== See also ==
- Jack and His Comrades
- Jack and His Golden Snuff-Box
- The Adventures of Covan the Brown-haired
- The Giant Who Had No Heart in His Body
- The Girl and the Dead Man
- The King of Lochlin's Three Daughters
- Tritill, Litill, and the Birds
- Jötunn
