= The King of Lochlin's Three Daughters =

Scottish fairy tale

"The King of Lochlin's Three Daughters" (Scottish Gaelic: Sgeulachd Air Nigheanan Righ Lochlainn) is a Scottish fairy tale collected by John Francis Campbell in his Popular Tales of the West Highlands, listing his informant as Neill Gillies, a fisherman near Inverary.

== Synopsis ==
Three giants carried off the king's three daughters. The sheanachy said that the only way to get them was through a ship that could travel over sea and land. A widow's oldest son asked her to bake him a bannock and roast a cock, because he would go to cut wood to build that ship. She offered him a small bannock with her blessing or a large one without it; he took the large one and refused to share some with a uruisg. When he reached the trees, everyone he cut down would attach itself to its roots again. His middle brother did the same, and ended the same, but the youngest son took the smaller and gave some to the uruisg. The uruisg told him to go home but come back in a year and a day. When he did, the boat was floating there, with a crew and gentlemen who were to marry the king's daughters.

They met a man drinking a river, and the youngest son brought him on board, and the same with a man eating stots in a park, intending to eat them all, and a man who could hear the grass grow. The listener listened, and said that this was the place where the giants kept the king's daughters. They descended on a creel down the giant hole. The first giant said they should have not have the king's daughter until they had set a man who could drink as much as he could; the drinker went up against him, and before he was full, the giant burst. The second giant said they should have not have the king's daughter until they had set a man who could eat as much as he could; the stot-eater went up against him, and before he was full, the giant burst. The third giant said they should have not have the king's daughter until the youngest son agreed to be his slave for a year and a day. He agreed and sent the servants and the daughters back. The gentlemen took them to the king and claimed to have rescued them.

At the end of the service, the giant gave him an eagle to fly out, and meat to feed it, but the meat was not enough, and the eagle turned back. The giant demanded another year and a day. After that, he gave him the eagle and more meat, but it was still not enough. After a third year and day, the giant sent him off with still more meat; it was not quite enough, but the son cut off some meat from his thigh, and the eagle finished the flight and gave him a whistle to summon it.

The son went to work for a smith as a gillie. The princesses demanded that he make for them crowns like they had when they were the giants' prisoners; the smith did not know what such crowns were, but the son had the eagle fetch the exact crowns. The princesses were astounded, and the king wanted to know where he learned to make such crowns. The smith confessed that his gillie had made them, and the king sent for the gillie. His gillies threw him roughly into the carriage; the son blew the whistle and had the eagle take him off and fill the carriage with stones, so that the king was nearly crushed by their fall, and those gillies were hanged. Another set came, were as rude, and delivered a coach full of dirt. The king's confidential servant went, told the son that the king sent for him and he should wash, and then put him in the carriage. He blew the whistle to have the eagle fetch him gold and silver clothing from the giant's castle. There, he told the king the true story. The gentlemen who sought to marry the king's daughters were hanged, and the son married the oldest daughter.

== Analysis ==
=== Tale type ===
The tale is classified in the international Aarne-Thompson-Uther Index as tale type ATU 301, "The Three Stolen Princesses": a hero - often having an animal parentage - finds two companions, climbs down a hole and rescues three maidens from their underground captivity; he is betrayed by his companions and trapped underground, but eventually finds a way out back to the surface - usually by flying on an eagle's back.

=== Motifs ===
The episode of the journey on the eagle's back is parallel to similar events in many fairy tales, where a hero needs to feed pieces of meat to the eagle (or another mythical bird) for the remainder of the journey, otherwise it will not complete its flight. In this regard, folklorist scholarship recognizes its similarities with the tale of Etana helping an eagle, a tale type later classified as Aarne–Thompson–Uther ATU 537, "The Eagle as helper: hero carried on the wings of a helpful eagle".

According to Irish folklorist Seán Ó Súilleabháin, the name Lochlainn designates Scandinavia "in general".

== See also ==
- Askeladden and the good helpers
- How the Hermit helped to win the King's Daughter
- Jack and his Comrades
- Jack and His Golden Snuff-Box
- Jean de l'Ours
- Long, Broad and Sharpsight
- The Adventures of Covan the Brown-haired
- The Blue Mountains
- The Bold Knight, the Apples of Youth, and the Water of Life
- The Fool of the World and the Flying Ship
- The Girl and the Dead Man
- The Griffin
- The Red Ettin
- The Rider Of Grianaig, And Iain The Soldier's Son
- The Story of Bensurdatu
