= Patrick Kennedy (folklorist) =

Irish folklorist (1801–1873)

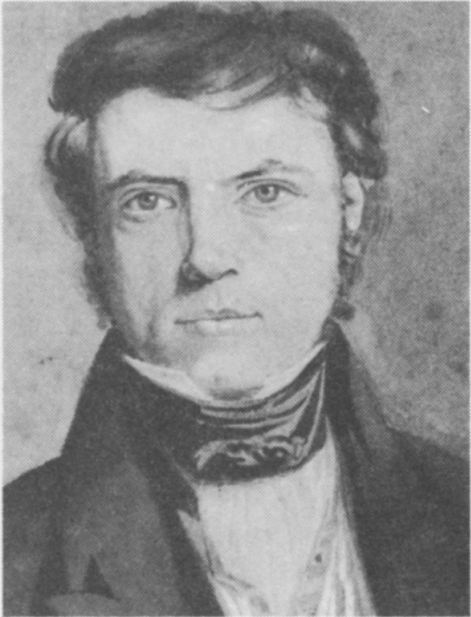
- Patrick Kennedy's self-portrait. ―Held by the Department of Irish Folklore, University College Dublin.
- Born: early part of 1801; Kilmyshal, County Wexford, Ireland
- Died: 29 or 28 March 1873; Dublin
- Resting place: Glasnevin Cemetery (Note: A different figure by the same name is given by O'Duffy.)
- Occupation: bookseller
- Spouse: Maria (née Kelly?)
- Writing career
- Language: English
- Genres: folklore, local lore
- Notable work: Legendary fictions of the Irish Celts (1866)

Signature
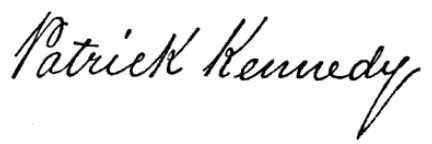

Patrick Kennedy (early 1801 – 29 March 1873) was a folklorist from County Wexford, Ireland. An educator turned bookseller, who also contributed various articles and reviews as a writer, he eventually became best known as a collector and publisher of Irish folktales and folklore, particularly from his native County Wexford.

== Life ==
Kennedy was born in the early part of 1801 in Kilmyshal beyond the outskirts of Bunclody, County Wexford, Ireland, in a financially well-off family of peasant stock. The lived in the village of Kilmyshal until he reached age six, and Mount Leinster, which loomed tall over his boyhood hometown, served as a backdrop of his first book.

In 1807, the family moved to a district in Castleboro, Killegney civil parish, County Wexford; it is known they resided particularly at Coolbawn townland from 1810 to 1814. Then in 1814 they moved again three miles east to Courtnacuddy, Rossdroit civil parish. (Note: Although Delaney refers to the "parish of Courtnacuddy", Kennedy himself refers to Courtnacuddy as a village, and is listed townland in Rossdroit civil parish in the census.) During this period, Patrick went away briefly in 1813 to attend school at Shanowle near Taghmon, staying with his mother's relatives, but this lasted only one or two terms. Subsequently, he was schooled closer to home at Cloughbawn, in Clonroche townland. The school was run by the famous "Mr. O'Neill", and at first Patrick's classes were held at the Cloughbawn Parish Church, until a schoolhouse was erected by the landlord, Robert Carew. Patrick lodged at the home was Morgan Dunne, his room and board paid for by tutoring. The Cloughbawn school had high standards and Patrick would later commend it in writing. His studies there lasted until 1818 or late 1819.

In 1819 when he took up a temporary teaching post at Tombrick School vacated by a friend (O'Brien) who was going to attend the Teachers Training School at Kildare Place. In 1820 or 21, Kennedy himself went to Dublin to enroll in the teacher-training program at Kildare Place (officially called the "Society for Promoting the Education of the Poor of Ireland"), and received such high evaluations that after completing the program c. 1821, he was not assigned to his landlord's school, as might have been expected, but gained employ at the Society itself as an instructor, or as Junior Assistant to the Superintendent, c. 1822. The Society, which the British Government as the apparatus overseeing the education of the whole of Ireland, was abolished in 1831, due to pressure from proponents of the Catholic Emancipation movement.

After the abolition of his position in 1831, Patrick Kennedy set himself up as a "Drawing Master", and as of 1836 his name is found registered with the Dublin Directory as Professor of Drawing. He married Maria Kelly on 24 October 1832. The Commission of Education which replaced the Society emphasized agricultural learning, and when the Glasnevin facility with a farm for practical training and a residence for the trainee teachers were completed in 1838, Kennedy was appointed Superintendent. But he was dismissed shortly after, having quarreled with the farm's manager.

At an uncertain time, he abandoned the teaching profession and established a lending-library and bookseller shop on 8 Anglesea Street, Dublin, which he later moved to the Anglesea Street on the corner of Cope Street. Edward Dowden remembered the proprietor "with round, bald head, grizzled beard, and a smile and twinkle over all his face". Kennedy ran the shop for some thirty years. Kennedy died 29 March 1873.

Alfred Webb's A Compendium of Irish Biography (1878) writes that his home often played host to the "Hibernian Temperance Association", though possibly this is a result of confusion with Dr. Patrick Kennedy, Bishop of Killaloe, associated with Father Mathew's temperance movement.

== Literary career ==
Kennedy's career in writing began by being published in such periodicals as the Wexford Independent and Duffy's Fireside Magazine. At first contributed articles and reviews, and later began to set down tales from his native Wexford County into writing.

=== Legends of Mount Leinster ===
In 1851, writing under the pen name "Harry Whitney" for the Wexford Independent, Kennedy asked his readership to send him rough accounts of local traditions, so he may print such stories and legends in his "Whitney Papers" column for the edification of the younger generation. (Note: It does not seem the case that a piece called "Legends of Mount Leinster" was serialized in the "Irish Quarterly Review" as almanac editor George Griffiths wrote in 1890, but rather, an advanced proof copy was provided to the Irish Quarterly Review in 1854.) Such stories formed the core of his first book, Legends of Mount Leinster (1855). In the book a cast of characters convene a fireside gathering, telling stories, probably modeled after actual gatherings Kennedy observed.

=== Legendary Fictions of the Irish Celts ===
Some of his stories which he sent to Sheridan Le Fanu in 1862 appeared as "Leinster Folk Lore" in the Dublin University Magazine from 1861 till 1869. Later, at Le Fanu's encouragement, a full collection was published as Legendary Fictions of the Irish Celts (1866). The first included tale is "Jack and His Comrades," later reprinted by Joseph Jacobs.

The collected stories were interleaved with a considerable amount of his own narrative: his "stories link by running commentary and characterized by often ponderous moralizing".

"The Palace in the Rath" is recognized as a folktale of the AT 503 ("The Gifts of the Little People") type, but Bo Almqvist prefers to regard it as a migratory legend, or, a "fabulate".

From the perspective of later providing material and influencing the Yeats or the Celtic Revival movement, the Legendary Fictions of the Irish Celts was the most important of Kennedy's works, alongside Fireside Stories of Ireland (1870), and Bardic Stories of Ireland (1871). Kennedy's "The Belated Priest" in Legendary Fictions was the source of Yeats's 1889 poem "The Priest and the Fairy".

=== Banks of the Boro ===
The Banks of the Boro: a Chronicle of the County of Wexford (1867) and Evenings in the Duffrey (1869) are described as the most ambitious of his works, insofar as they each is designed with (an albeit nominal) plot, and the two most important of Kennedy's contribution in the estimation of IFC collector James G. Delaney. These plots were stitched together from actual events he either witnessed himself, "or heard secondhand from his friends in the years 1812 to 1822".

In The Banks of the Boro, Kennedy's alias Harry Whitney (or "H. W.") still makes appearance. The namesake Whitney family of Moneytucker lived down the road from the Kennedy home at Courtnacuddy. Mr. Whitney of Moneytucker is a hero in the tale of "The Fate of the Priest Catcher" from the time of the Penal Laws, having sequestered a fleeing priest and assisting his escape. The storyteller states that the Whitney's good deed was remembered, so that some years later, the life of a kinsman (Whitney of Rathnure) was spared in the Irish Rebellion of 1798. But Robert Whitney of Moneytucker testified to suffering a harrowing experience at the hands of the rebels, for his house was plundered and burned, himself taken captive, lashed, and threatened to be killed a number of times. The 1798 rebellion was before Patrick Kennedy's birth, but there were three or four elder siblings who experienced it, and three yeomen came riding in search of rebels at their home, with one searcher about to torch the place down before a comrade intervened.

The book contained not just tales and legend, but also ballads performed and the games played (e.g. "Old Dowd and his Daughters") at wakes. Delaney confirms that even in later times in the region, such pastimes at wakes were often engaged in, in unrestrained and prolonged fashion, particularly if the deceased was a transient, with no close acquaintances to mourn him.

=== Bardic Stories of Ireland ===
Bardic Stories of Ireland (1871) was another important work for the Celtic Revival. The tale "Baille and Ailinn" in this collection was adapted by Yeats into the poem "Baile and Aillinn".

== Critical evaluation ==
Patrick Kennedy was one of the pioneers in uncovering Irish folkloric material, with a lasting impact on William Butler Yeats and the Celtic Revival movement. The tales were told in rusticated English of the Irish peasantry who had established roots in The Pale, the anglicized part of Ireland. He is "widely credited with preserving Irish idioms in the turn of phrase, sentence structure, Irish words".

Kennedy's folklore-collecting has been assessed as "unfailingly accurate" by James G. Delaney, a folklore collector for the Irish Folklore Commission who has conducted field work largely in the Midlands, but began his career in 1954 collecting folklore in areas of Wexford where Kennedy grew up. Kennedy was also assiduous about recording folklore for the sake of it being tradition deserving to be preserved, even in the cases of a particular ballad he did not have high opinion of, or the custom of irreverently playing games and singing ballad, for which he privately held reservations.

Bo Almqvist also compares Kennedy favorably to Thomas Crofton Croker as folktale collector, and although Kennedy did to add literary flair and contrived humour, or somewhat dwelled on stereotypes of the Irishman such as his love for alcohol, but did not take license and tamper with the tales in a major way compared with Croker. Kennedy's tales from County Wexford, mostly recalled from memory as told in English during his youth, are valuable since they preserve the folklore of a region that became somewhat neglected from folklore-collection subsequently in the 19th century.

== List of works ==
Under pseudonym of Harry Whitney

- Legends of Mount Leinster (1855).

As Patrick Kennedy

- Fictions of Our Forefathers (1859).
- Legendary fictions of the Irish Celts (1867).
- The Banks of the Boro a Chronicle of the County of Wexford (1867).
- Evenings in the Duffrey (1869).
- The Fireside Stories of Ireland (1870).
- The Bardic Stories of Ireland (1871).
