= Popular Tales of the West Highlands =

1860s collection of fairy atles

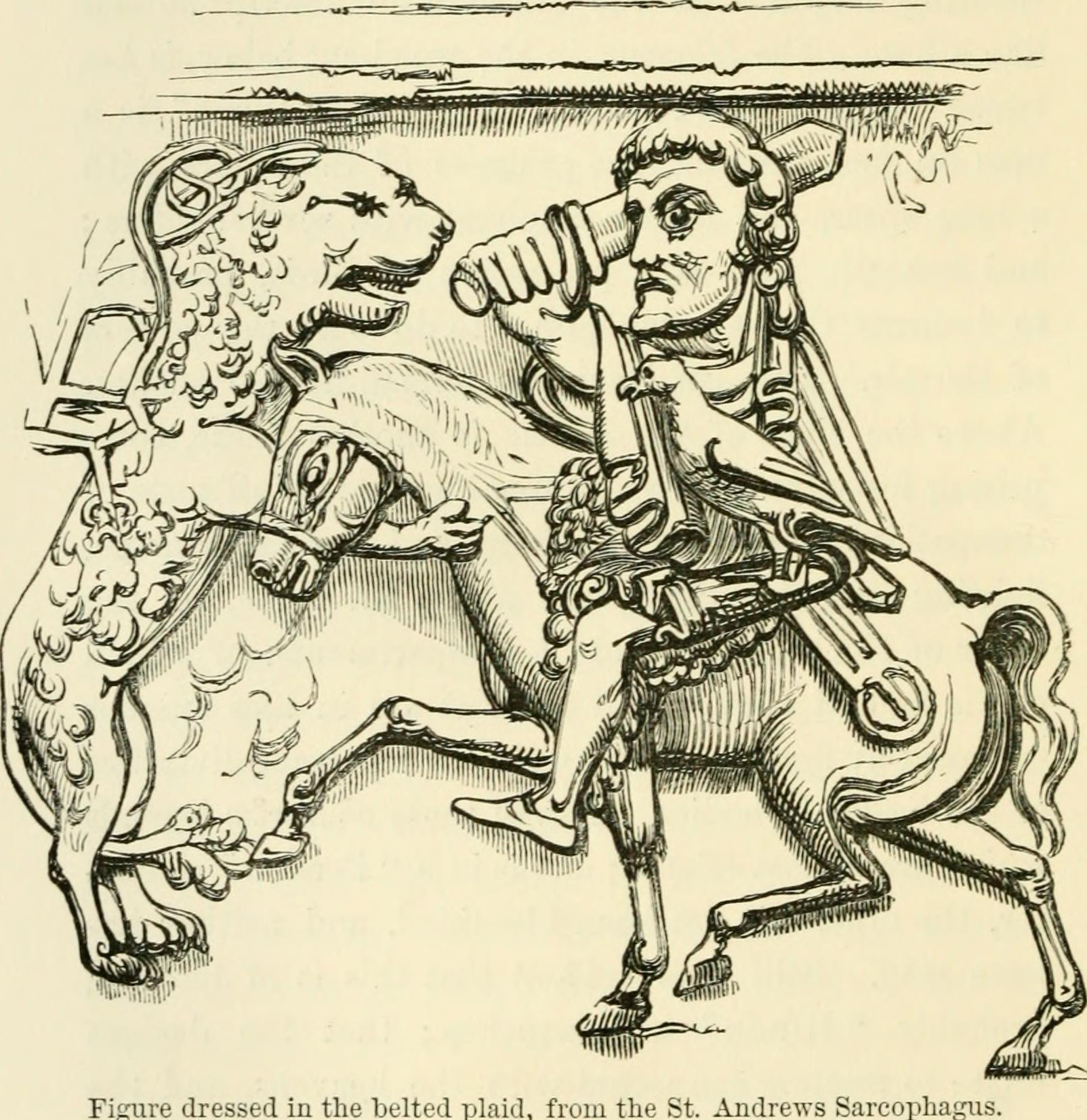
Detail of the St Andrews Sarcophagus

Popular Tales of the West Highlands is a four-volume collection of fairy tales, collected and published by John Francis Campbell, and often translated from Gaelic. Alexander Carmichael was one of the main contributors. The collection in four volumes was first published in 1860–62 in Edinburgh. A new edition (with different pagination) appeared under the auspices of the Islay Association in 1890–93. Campbell dedicated the work in 1860 to the son of my Chief, the Marquess of Lorne.

Volume IV, subtitled "Postscript", contained miscellany. The greater part of it was devoted to commentary on the Ossian controversy, the rest filled with descriptions of traditional costume, music, and lore on supernatural beings. More West Highland Tales (1940) was later published, provided with translations by John Gunn McKay.

== Fairy tales ==
=== Volume I ===
- The Young King Of Easaidh Ruadh
- The Battle of the Birds
- The Tale of the Hoodie
- The Sea-Maiden
- Conall Cra Bhuidhe
- The Tale of Conal Crovi
- The Tale of Connal
- Murchag a's Mionachag
- The Brown Bear of the Green Glen
- The Three Soldiers
- The Story of the White Pet
- The Daughter of the Skies
- The Girl and the Dead Man
- The King who Wished to Marry His Daughter
- The Poor Brother and the Rich
- The King Of Lochlin's Three Daughters
- Maol a Chliobain
- Fables
- Bailie Lunnain
- The Slim Swarthy Champion
- The History of the Ceabharnach
- The Tale of the Shifty Lad, the Widow's Son

=== Volume II ===
- The Chest
- The Inheritance
- The Three Wise Men
- A Puzzle
- The Ridere (Knight) of Riddles
- The Burgh
- The Tulman
- The Isle of Pabaidh
- Sanntraigh
- Cailliach Mhor Chlibhrich
- The Smith and the Fairies
  - Kirkcudbright
  - Sutherland
  - Badenoch
  - Ross
  - Bearnairidh
  - Isle of Man
  - Devonshire
  - Conclusion: Fairy Beliefs
- The Fine
- The Two Shepherds
- Osean After the Feen
- The Barra Widow's Son
- The Tale of the Queen Who Sought a Drink From a Certain Well
- The Origin of Loch Ness
- Conall
- Maghach Colgar
- The Brollachan
- Murachadh Mac Brian
- The Three Widows
- The Son of the Scottish Yeoman who Stole the Bishop's Horse and Daughter, and the Bishop Himself
- The Widow and her Daughters
- The Tale of the Soldier
- The Sharp Grey Sheep
- The Widow's Son
- Mac-a-Rusgaich
- MacIain Direach
- Fearachur Leigh
- The Tale of Sgire Mo Chealag
- The Cat and the Mouse
- The Three Questions
- The Fair Gruagach, Son of the King of Eirinn
- The Knight of the Red Shield
- The Tail

=== Volume III ===
- The Rider Of Grianaig, And Iain The Soldier's Son.
- Fionn's Questions.
- Diarmaid And Grainne
- The Lay of Diarmaid
  - The Story of the Lay of Diarmaid, No. 1
  - The Lay of Diarmaid, No. 2
  - The Lay of Yeearmaid. No. 3
  - The Lay of Diarmaid, No. 4
  - Fables
- How the Fox Took a Turn Out of the Goat
- How the Cock Took a Turn Out of the Fox
- The Hen
- The Keg of Butter
- The Fox and the Little Bonnach
- Caol Reidhinn. Why the Name was Given to it
- Thomas of the Thumb.
- The Bulls.
- The Hoodie Catechising the Young One
- The Hoodie and the Fox
- The Yellow Muilearteach
- The Story of the Lay of the Great Fool
- The Lay of the Great Fool
- Guaigean Ladhrach 'S Loirean Spagach
- Conall Gulban; or Guilbeinach, or Gulbairneach
  - Introduction
  - The Story of Conall Gulban
  - Story of the King of Spain.
  - The Story of Conall Gulban (Part II)
- John, Son of the King of Bergen
- The Master and his Man.
- The Praise of Goll
- Osgar, the Son of Oisein
- The Lay of Osgar
- How the Een was Set Up
- The Reason Why the Dallag (Dog-Fish) is Called the King's Fish
- The Lay of Magnus
  - Manus
  - The Song of the Smithy
- Duan Na Ceardach
  - Nighean Righ Fo Thuinn. The Daughter Of King Under-Waves

=== Volume IV ===
  - Postscript
  - I. Ossian, Points for Argument, Statement of the Case, Current Opinions-- English; Scotch; Irish; Irish Arguments Considered, Lowland Scotch
  - Authorities—Heroes of Ossian, References to Fenian and other Traditions, and to Ossianic Heroes and Poems in Old Writings, chronologically arranged.
  - Published Evidence and Books
  - Popular Ballads
  - Current Gaelic Traditions
  - Internal Evidence
  - Essay on Gaelic Poetry by H. MacNair
  - Letter from John Dewar
  - Letter from D. K. Torrie
  - Letter from Archibald Sinclair
  - Letter from Alexander Carmichael
  - Conclusion
  - Ossianic Proverbs and Family History
  - II. Traditions—British Traditions
  - Welsh Stories, etc., compared with Gaelic
  - III. Mythology—Aryan Theory
  - West Highland Stories
  - Supernatural History—Water-Bulls, and Water-Horses, Boobries, Dragons, Fairies, etc.
  - Icelandic Saga
  - IV. A Plea for Gaelic
  - List of Sanscrit words, Topography, Some words common to Gaelic and English, Other Languages, Saxon
  - V. Highland Dress
  - VI. Celtic Art and its probable origin
  - VII. Music
  - Conclusion
  - List of Ballads orally collected
  - References to Printed Ballads
  - List of Stories Collected
  - Index
