= John Francis Campbell =

Scottish author and scholar (1821–1885)

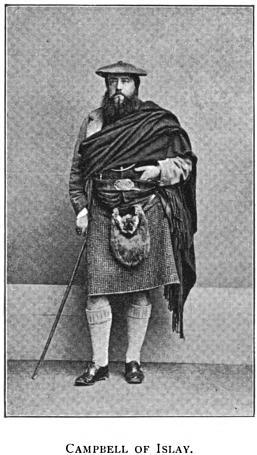
John F. Campbell of Islay, famous folktale collector

John Francis Campbell (Scottish Gaelic: Iain Frangan Caimbeul; Islay, 29 December 1821 – Cannes, 17 February 1885), also known as Young John of Islay (Scottish Gaelic: Iain Òg Ìle) was a Scottish writer and scholar who specialised in Celtic studies, considered an authority on the subject.

== Early life ==
John Francis Campbell was born on Islay on 29 December 1821 to Lady Eleanor Charteris (1796–1832), eldest daughter of Francis Wemyss Charteris Douglas, and Walter Frederick Campbell of Islay (1798–1855), MP for Argyll. Campbell was a descendant (great-great-great-grandson) of Daniel Campbell of Shawfield who had bought Islay from the Campells of Cawdor, for £12,000 in 1726. His upbringing meant he was a fluent speaker of Gaelic.

Campbell was his father's heir, but creditors forced the island of Islay into administration, and the family left in 1847. After his father's death he was known as Campbell of Islay, even though the island had by then been sold.

== Education and early career ==
Campbell was educated at Eton and the University of Edinburgh.

He was called to the bar at the Inner Temple 1851, and appointed private secretary to George Campbell, 8th Duke of Argyll, the Lord Privy Seal, in 1853. He was assistant secretary to the General Board of Health in 1854, he became secretary to the Trinity House Royal Commission of Lighthouses in London 1859. In 1861 he was Groom of the Privy Chamber.

== Celtic studies ==
Campbell was known as an authority on Celtic folklore and the culture of the Gaelic peoples.

=== Fieldwork and Popular Tales of the West Highlands ===
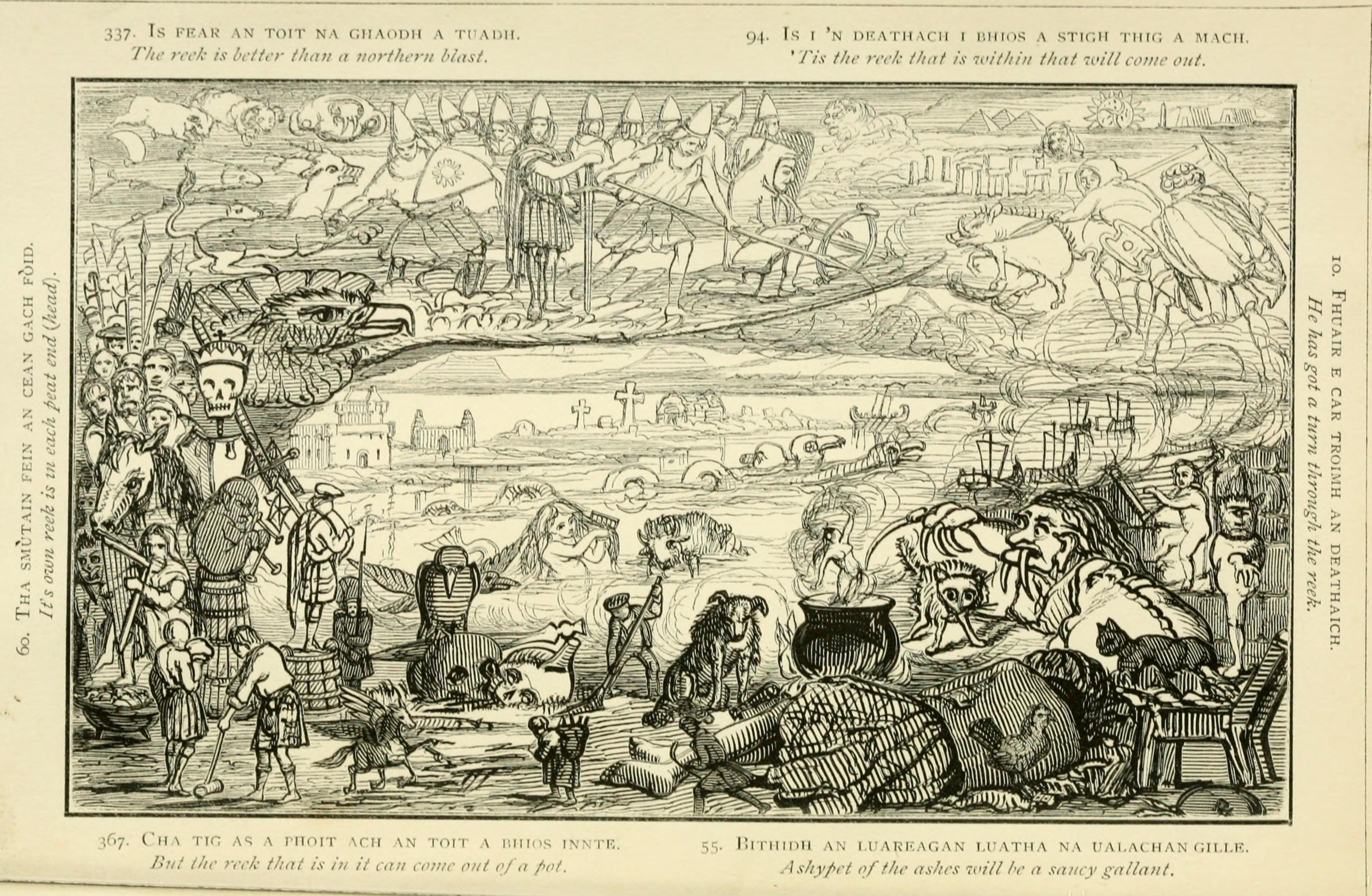
Illustration from Popular Tales of the West Highlands

His best-known published work is the bilingual Popular Tales of the West Highlands (4 vols., 1860–62). Its achievement has been compared by Richard Dorson to that of Grimms' Fairy Tales.

Its origins lay in Popular Tales from the Norse (1859) by his friend George Webbe Dasent. Reading Dasent's book, Campbell realised that he had heard Gaelic versions of some of the stories when young. He organised extensive fieldwork to collect Gaelic tales, and edited some of the resulting corpus for publication: a substantial part of the research remained unpublished at the time. He dedicated Popular Tales of the West Highlands to the Marquess of Lorne, son of George Campbell, 8th Duke of Argyll. Among the recruits to Campbell's collecting team was Alexander Carmichael. Campbell, with others, influenced the Irish folklorist Patrick Kennedy.

Campbell supported Francis James Child's interest in collecting traditional ballads in a number of ways, from sending ballads collected through fieldwork to providing introductions.

=== Leabhar na Feinne ===
In 1872 Campbell self-published Leabhar na Feinne, a collection of heroic ballads culled from manuscripts held by libraries, but to his chagrin this endeavour failed to meet with success.

=== The Celtic Dragon Myth ===
The Celtic Dragon Myth was published posthumously in 1911. Campbell had started preliminary work on The Celtic Dragon Myth in 1862, and work intensified on it from 1870 until 1884. After Campbell's death in 1885 the noted Gaelic scholar George Henderson contributed some translation work, provided an introduction, and completed the editing of the manuscript for its eventual publication in 1911.

=== Other works ===
- A Short American Tramp in the Fall of 1864 (1865)
- Frost and Fire: Natural Engines, Tool-Marks and Chips (1865, 2 vols.)
- My Circular Notes: Extracts From Journals, Letters Sent Home, Geological and Other Notes, Written While Travelling Westwards Round the World, From July 6, 1874 to July 6, 1875 (1876)
- Canntaireachd: Articulate Music (1880)
- Thermography (1883). Campbell held a lifelong interest in the sciences, especially geology and meteorology. He invented the meteorological sunshine recorder or thermograph that bears his name as the Campbell–Stokes recorder.

He edited for publication his late father's work Life in Normandy, Sketches (1863).

== Travel ==
Campbell travelled extensively throughout the Scottish Highlands and Islands with his scribes, scrupulously recording West Highland tales, Fenian ballads, songs, charms and anecdotes.

He was proficient in Gaelic, Danish, Norwegian, Swedish, Lapp, Italian, Spanish and German. He travelled extensively, especially in Europe and Scandinavia. In 1874 he embarked on a year-long world tour that took him to America, Japan, China, Java, Ceylon and India. Campbell was acquainted with Colin Alexander McVean, a Scottish engineer hired by Japan's Public Works as chief surveyor, and visited sights around Tokyo with McVean at the end of 1874, including Nikko. During the observation of the Venus transit by the Meiji government on 9 December 1874, he superintended a theodolite on the Gotenyama Hill site in Tokyo. He travelled through the central part of Honshu to Kyoto, then left Japan from Kobe in February 1875. He bought Japanese antiques and showed them in London to friends including Frank Dillion.

== Later life ==
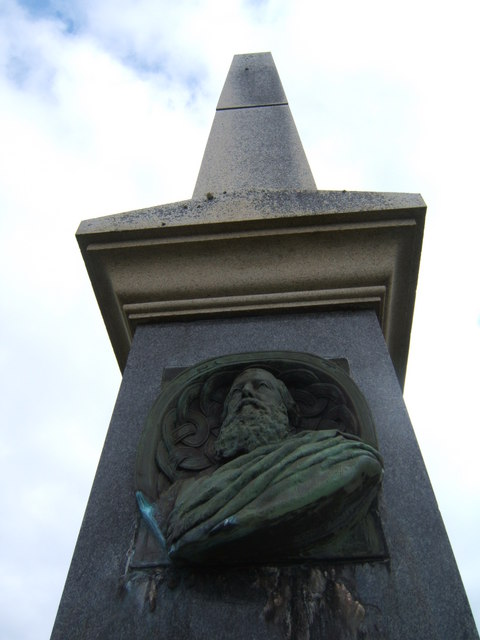
Monument near Bridgend, Islay

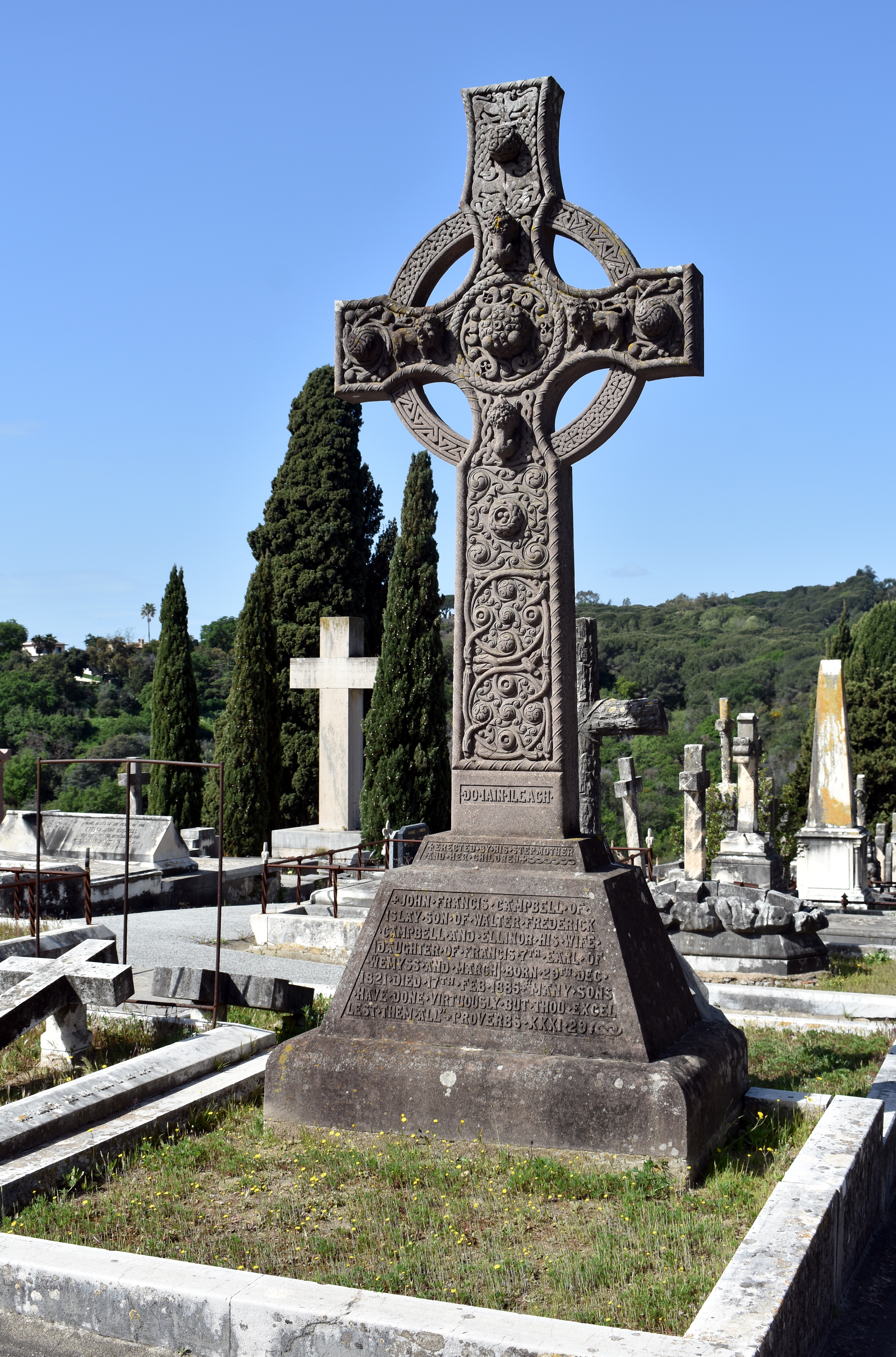
Celtic cross on Grave of John Francis Campbell

He is buried under a replica of Islay's treasured Kildalton Cross in the Grand Jas Cemetery (le cimetière "du Grand Jas") at Cannes.

Campbell never married.
