= Făt-Frumos with the Golden Hair =

Romanian fairy tale

Folk tale
- Name: Făt-Frumos with the Golden Hair
- Also known as: The Foundling Prince
- Aarne–Thompson grouping: ATU 314, "Goldener"
- Mythology: Romanian
- Country: Romania

Făt-Frumos with the Golden Hair (Romanian: Făt-Frumos cu părul de aur) or The Foundling Prince is a Romanian fairy tale about Făt-Frumos collected by Petre Ispirescu in Legende sau basmele românilor.

The story is classified in the international Aarne-Thompson-Uther Index as tale type ATU 314, "Goldener": a hero has a horse as a helper, and later finds work as a king's gardener.

== Source ==
According to Ispirescu, the tale was provided by his father, who heard it in the period of 1820-1834. Ispirescu then published it in 1872.

== Publication ==
The tale was also published under the title Fet-Frumosu cu perulu de auru, both by author I. C. Fundescu and Romanian folklorist Atanasie Marian Marienescu in newspaper Albina (ro).

== Synopsis ==
A hermit lived alone. One day, a box floated down the river to him. It contained a beautiful boy child, Făt-Frumos, and a letter saying that his mother was a king's daughter who had erred and done this out of fear of her parents. A grape vine sprung up in his hut, and with its fruit, he was able to feed the child. When he was grown, the hermit died, telling him that a lion would come to dig his grave, and that he should take the horse reins in the attic, which, if he shook, would bring him a horse. He did as his foster father said. The horse gave him clothing, and he rode off. At the horse's direction, he took service with three fairies. The horse told him that every seven years, their bathroom had a flow of gold that would turn anyone's hair gold; it also had a chest with three magnificent suits of clothing. One day, the fairies went to a party but directed him to summon them back if the gold started to flow. It did. The horse directed him to bathe in it himself and take the clothes. He did, and they escaped the fairies.

He hid his hair and got a job working for a gardener for a king. One day, the king's oldest daughter arranged for herself and her sisters to bring melons to the king: hers was overripe, her next sister's was ripe, the youngest's was just about ripe. His councilors explained that the oldest should have been married already, the next was ready for marriage, and even the youngest daughter was nearly ready. Suitors came for them, and the oldest was married to a prince. The wedding procession set out from the castle; only the youngest princess stayed behind. Făt-Frumos loosed his hair, put on the suit like a flowering meadow, and rode his horse over the garden. It did much damage, but the princess was enchanted with him. The gardener was angry, but the princess gave him gold and told him not to beat the boy. When the second sister married, the youngest princess stayed behind, the boy loosed his hair, wore a suit like the starry night and rode his horse, ruining the garden; the youngest princess bribed the gardener with two handfuls of gold not to beat him. The king had a feast at his hunting lodge; again the youngest princess did not go, and Făt-Frumos loosed his hair, wore a suit with the sun, the moon, and the stars, and ruined the garden so badly that weeks did not restore it. The youngest princess bribed the gardener with three handfuls of gold.

The king saw how his youngest daughter was always sad. His councilors suggested that all the princes and nobles should walk under the gate, and whoever the princess dropped a golden apple to would be her husband. They all walked, but she did not drop the apple. Then all the servants, last of all the bald undergardener, Făt-Frumos, appeared. She dropped the apple to him. The king refused, but after three times she took the walk three times and each time dropped the apple to him he relented. They married quietly and the king gave them a hut in a distant corner of his courtyard.

The princes who had wooed her were offended and banded together to attack her father. His sons-in-law raised armies to come to his aid. Făt-Frumos said he would do the same, but his father-in-law jeered at him, finally let him come only as a water carrier. But out of sight, Făt-Frumos changed into the clothes he had stolen from the fairies and came to the king's aid. The forces attacked three times, and the third, Făt-Frumos was wounded. The king gave him a handkerchief to bind his wounds.

The king began to go blind. It was learned that only the milk of red wild goats would cure him. His sons-in-law set out to find it. Făt-Frumos found the goats and got the milk, and offered to sell some to his brothers-in-law if they would let him brand them as his slaves. They agreed, thinking they could escape, but only Făt-Frumos's milk restored the king's sight.

At the banquet, Făt-Frumos revealed that he had branded the other two kings as his slaves and was the hero who had helped the king's army. The king demanded that he reappear as he appeared then. When Făt-Frumos did so, he gave up his throne to Făt-Frumos. The first thing Făt-Frumos did was free his brothers-in-law.

== Translations ==
The tale was also translated from the original Romanian into English with the title The Hermit's Foundling with the Golden Hair; Prince Charming, the Golden-Haired, and Lad-Handsome with the Golden Hair.

== Analysis ==
=== Tale type ===
Romanian scholars classify the tale as type 314 of the international Aarne-Thompson-Uther Index. In tale type ATU 314, "Goldener", the hero enters the service of a sorcerer or another magical being, and finds a horse that warns him about the danger his benefactor poses. The hero then flees with the horse to another kingdom, where he hides his golden hair (hence the name of the type) under a cap and finds work as a king's gardener. According to Romanian scholarship, the hero of the tale type is also called Cheleş, for the fact that he hides his golden hair under a cap of ox bladder. Fourteen variants of tale type 314 are registered in Romania, with six others combined with the narrative about the hero answering "Nu ştiu" or "I Don't Know" (type ATh 532).

=== Motifs ===
==== The suitor selection test ====
The motif of the princess throwing an apple to her suitor is indexed as motif H316, "Suitor test: apple thrown indicates princess' choice (often golden apple)". According to mythologist Yuri Berezkin and other Russian researchers, the motif is "popular" in Iran, and is also attested "in Central Europe, the Balkans, the Caucasus, the Near East, and Central Asia".

According to Turkologist Karl Reichl, types ATU 314 and ATU 502 contain this motif: the princess chooses her own husband (of lowly appearance) in a gathering of potential suitors, by giving him an object (e.g., an apple). However, he also remarks that the motif is "spread in folk literature" and may appear in other tale types.

==== The gardener hero ====
According to Richard MacGillivray Dawkins, in the tale type, the hero as gardener destroys and restores the garden after he finds work, and, later, fights in the war. During the battle, he is injured, and the king dresses his wound with a kerchief, which will serve as token of recognition.

==== Quest for the remedy ====
A motif that appears in tale type 314 is the hero having to find a cure for the ailing king, often the milk of a certain animal (e.g., a lioness). According to scholar Erika Taube, this motif occurs in tales from North Africa to East Asia, even among Persian- and Arabic-speaking peoples. Similarly, Hasan M. El-Shamy noted that the quest for the king's remedy appears as a subsidiary event "in the Arab-Berber culture area".

== Variants ==
=== Făt-Frumos cel rătăcit ===
Author Petre Ispirescu collected the tale Făt-Frumos cel rătăcit ("Făt-Frumos, The Lost One"), from a teller named P. Niculescu, in Craiova, in 1862. In this tale, a poor working couple feeds their mare, and longs to have a son. One day, they wander until they find a sorcerer who gives them an apple, but warns them that the apple must not be shared with any animal. They go back home and eat the apple, and leave the peels in the yard, which their mare eats. Nine months later, a boy is born to the human couple, and a foal to the mare. The old man is glad to have been doubly blessed and allows his son to keep the horse. The boy grows up fast and becomes too strong and smart, and, one day, rides the horse at a very fast pace away from his parents' farm. The couple try to find him, but he is too far away to be seen, so they weep for their vanished son. Meanwhile, the boy reaches a distant place and feels he is unable to retrace his tracks, and cries over the situation. The horse tries to comfort him, and gives him its bridle, then gallops somewhere else to find a place they can stay the night. After a while, the horse returns and guides its master to the castle of three fairies, where he works as their servant. With the horse's secret guidance, the boy learns of the fairies' secrets (clothes and nuts in shelves), and their golden bath. One day, the boy stands beneath their golden water, and bathes his hair in it with a golden tint. He then takes the horse and gallops to another kingdom, far away from the fairies, where he finds work as a gardener's assistant to an emperor. When the gardener falls ill, the boy takes bouquets for the emperor's three daughters, the first made of faded flowers, the second with flowers in bloom, and the third with budding flowers. Later, the emperor takes the court to church, and leaves the boy alone in the garden. While the nobles are away, he summons the horse to take a ride around the garden in brass armour - an event seen by the youngest princess - then goes to church. This happens again with the boy wearing silver and golden armour. Time passes, and the emperor summons a crowd of suitors for the princesses to choose their husbands by throwing a golden apple to them. The youngest, however, withholds hers until the gardener's assistant passes in front of her. She throws her golden apple to the poor boy, to the king's consternation. He agrees to their marriage, but banishes her to a buffalo pen with the husband. The boy, to alleviate their situation, summons his horse and orders him to build an underground palace for them. Later, war breaks out, and the boy is given a lame mount to join the war. While he is away, he summons the magic horse and fights three times against his father-in-law's enemies. At the end of the tale, the king goes blind, and, according to an astrologer, only milk from the bird that flies over the Jordan river can cure him. The boy rides the horse and finds the bird's milk, while his brothers-in-law buy a fake remedy from a seller. Finally, the boy goes to the emperor's court and ends his charade.

=== Le Chauve aux Cheveux D'Or ===
Romanian historian Nicolae Iorga translated a Romanian tale into French, giving it the title Le Chauve aux Cheveux D'Or ("The Bald [One] With the Golden Hair"), collected from an informant in Jassy (Iasi). In this tale, a poor couple do not have a son. One day, a hermit appears and gives the wife an apple for her to eat. The same apple is eaten by the couple's mare. The mare foals a young colt and the woman a boy. The colt turns into a horse with "fiery eyes" that belie its hidden magic power, and the boy a youth with peerless strength. One day, they decide to flee from home into the world. At a distance, the horse talks to the youth and gives him a bridle to summon the animal should the need arise. They gallop to a palace of three fairies where the youth works as an ostler. Some time later, the horse confides in him that the youth's fortune lies in the palace: he must wait for the fairies to bathe and be dowsed in their golden water, then take three nuts to hide the fairies' linen robes and run away on the horse. The youth works for the fairies for years until, following the horse's advice, he stands under the fairies' shower of gold and gilds his hair with a golden colour. He also takes the fairies' three nuts and flees on the horse. They ride to a distant castle where an emperor lives with his three daughters, the youngest being the most beautiful. The horse then advises the youth to hide his golden hair under a cap and to work there as the royal gardener's assistant. Time passes, and the youth, in his new job, arranges bouquets for the three princesses, and places two extravagant flowers in the youngest's. Later, the emperor arranges marriages for his three daughters: the elder two marry foreign princes, but the youngest refuses any of her potential suitors. The story then flashes back to the time when the imperial family went to church, and the gardener's assistant seized the opportunity to ride his horse around the garden in a copper armor, then in a silver armour, and lastly in a golden armour - events witnessed by the youngest princess, who stayed at the castle. Back in the present, she decides to marry the gardener's assistant, and throws him a golden apple three times. The emperor, her father, agrees to her marriage, but expels her from the castle. Years later, war breaks out, and the emperor's sons-in-law rush to defend the empire, while the bald son-in-law is given a lame mount, but he summons the horse with the bridle and kills the emperor's enemies. Some years pass; the emperor is going blind, and the only cure is milk from the fairies that live beyond the river. The sons-in-law bring him the wrong milk, but the bald one rides his horse, gets the milk and cures his father-in-law.

=== Împăratul fără copii ===
Writer and folklorist Cristea Sandu Timoc collected a Romanian variant from teller Jovan Ilic and published it with the title Împăratul fără copii ("The Emperor without a Son"). In this tale, a childless emperor longs to have a son. He even tries to find a remedy for his wife, the empress. Fortunately, a hermit appears in the city and offers the solution for the empress: an apple that can grant her the son they have longed for. The empress eats the apple, and its peels are eaten by a mare. The empress gives birth to a son, while the mare foals a colt with a horn on its head. As the boy and the colt grow up, the colt becomes a wild horse that no one can approach, save for the young prince. Some time later, the emperor notices that neither his son, nor the horse are at the stables, for they were taken by the dragons (Romanian: zmei). The young prince is made to be their servant, while the zmei lock up the horse in their stables. The young prince feeds the zmei's horses, and talks to his own. The apple-born animal tells the prince to shave the zmei and collect some of their blood and beard's hair for them to use in their upcoming escape. The prince follows his horse's advice and brings the blood and hair. He also fetches copper, silver and gold from three fountains, which gilds his hair to a golden colour. The horse advises him to hide his golden hair under a cap so people think he is bald, and lastly to steal a pebble from under the zmei's bed before they make their escape. With all objects in hand, the prince and his horse ride away to the border of the zmei's domains, which are alerted by their mare. The zmei take the mare and chase after the duo, but the horse instructs the prince to throw back the pebble (which creates a stone wall), the hairs (which create a forest), and the blood (which creates a sea) to deter the zmei. At a safe distance, the horse tells the prince to find a job in a castle where an emperor lives with his three daughters, and gives him a bridle so the prince can summon the equine. The prince finds work as the royal gardener's assistant, and eventually as the royal gardener when the latter retires. One day, when the emperor goes to church with his daughters, but leaves the youngest at home, the prince uses the bridle to summon the horse and tramples the flowers. After the emperor returns, he sees the destroyed garden and admonishes the prince, who lies that some knights came and trampled the garden - a lie that is corroborated by the third princess. Later, the gardener makes some bouquets for the princesses, the youngest getting the most beautiful. Soon after, the emperor arranges marriages for his daughters: eligible bachelors are to pass by a gazebo where the princesses will stand and will throw an apple to their suitors of choice. The elder princesses throw theirs to princes, while the youngest withholds hers until the gardener passes by them. The princess throws the apple to him, to the emperor's anger, who banishes her to the edge of the realm with her lowly husband. Time passes: war breaks out, and the emperor's sons-in-law ride into battle to defend the kingdom, while the gardener is given a lame mount. While the emperor is away, the gardener summons his horse with the bridle and fights his father-in-law's enemies, but injures his hand in the process. The emperor dresses his wound with a scarf, and the gardener returns home to his wife. While he rests, the empress pays a visit to her daughter, the third princess, and is surprised that their home is decorated with gold. The princess then tells her mother that her husband has a stash of copper, silver and gold, and the empress insists she comes back to the castle to explain the whole story to the emperor. Following her mother's advice, the princess tells her husband the emperor summoned them, and that the gardener should doff the lowborn disguise. The gardener agrees and lets the princess go ahead of him. He then summons his horse, ditches the cap and rides to the banquet to reveal himself.

=== Cojocilă ===
In a Romanian tale collected in 1986, from teller Virgil Bornescu, in Nifon village, Tulcea, with the title Cojocilă, an old couple has three sons. One day, the parents gather their sons for them to tell their dreams: the elder dreamt he was eating a pot of beans; the middle one that he was eating a pot of milk, and the third refuses to divulge his dream, so his father presumes he is thinking of some future treasure, and beats him up. Later, the man gives him better boots and clothes and he tells his dream: Saint Peter was washing his hands and God was giving him a towel to dry them. The boy then says he will go out in the world, so he dons a "cojoc" (sheepskin waistcoat) and departs. Some time later, he reaches a well where a man is drawing water. He asks for some water and the man lets him have it, then takes him in. After three days of silence, the man welcomes the boy and gives him the keys to the pantry, telling the boy he is allowed to snoop around, save for a specific room, while he is away to visit his brothers. The boy spies on the man turning into a snake (zmeu) and faints. When he comes to, he decides to open every door, even the forbidden one, and finds a horse. The animal tells the boy to remove the sheepskin cojoc and to take a bath in a boiler, which he does and is bathed in gold. The horse then bids the boy tie every hair of its mane, lest the zmei hear it and alert their brother. The boy does so, and escapes the man's lair on the horse. However, he leaves a single strand of hair untied, which the zmei hear over nine seas and nine countries and inform their brother about the fleeing duo. The zmeu resigns that the boy took the horse and lets him have it.

As for the boy, he and the horse reach the edge of an emperor's village, and he takes shelter with an old couple, who he addresses as mother and father, and sleeps soundly after the chase. The old man, being a flower seller, sends the boy to the market to sell flowers, and he earns a thousand lei. The couple then send the boy on a Sunday to the emperor's three daughters to sell bouquets. When the boy arrives, the girls take a liking to him and wish to buy the flowers for two or five lei a piece. He agrees to their price and delivers them the bouquets, but accidentally shows the youngest princess his gilded skin underneath the cojoc, causing her to pay fifty lei for it. The elder princesses notice this and scold the youngest for falling in love with a florist and going against their joint decision. The following Sunday, the episode happens again. Some time later, the king sends for eligible bachelors of noble stock for his daughters to choose their husbands. The noblemen and boyars are donning silver, gold and rich garments. The old couple nudge Cojocilă to try his luck in the assemblage. The boy then summons the horse and asks it to go for a run ("să facem o roată") over the castle and take him to the assemblage of suitors. Back to the princesses, the elder two have chosen their bridegrooms, but not the youngest, who did not like any person in the gathering and is being chastised by the emperor. Suddenly, Cojocilă, all in gold, appears on the horse, to the amazement of the crowd, and the princess recognizes him, then throws him an apple, signifying her choice. The emperor then marries his three daughters in grand weddings.

== See also ==
- The Black Colt
- The Magician's Horse
- Iron John
- The Hairy Man
- Little Johnny Sheep-Dung
