= Roswall and Lillian =

Roswall and Lillian is a medieval Scottish chivalric romance. A late appearing tale, it nevertheless draws heavily on folkloric motifs for its account of an exiled prince, reduced to poverty, who rises from it to win a princess.

The date of the composition is uncertain, and the name of the writer is unknown. It is estimated that the work was written in either the 15th or the 16th century, but the earliest surviving version is a printed edition dating to 1663. The plot is very similar to the 1580s English ballad The Lord of Lorn and the False Steward, which suggests a common origin of the tales. Several of the tale's folkloric elements are shared by a number of known fairy tales, including Iron Hans, The Gold-bearded Man, and The Hairy Man. All these tales are classified in the international Aarne-Thompson-Uther Index as type ATU 502, "The Wild Man as Helper".

In the tale, Prince Roswall is exiled for having released his father's prisoners, who he viewed as victims of a miscarriage of justice. His father allows him to take a small fortune and a companion with him to exile. The companion betrays the prince, steals his identity and wealth, and then abandons him. The impoverished prince is eventually hired by a different king, and then falls in love with his new employer's daughter. Three unnamed knights from his homeland help Roswall in his efforts to secure her hand in marriage and to expose the imposter prince.

== Synopsis ==
Roswall frees some of his father's prisoners whom he feels have been imprisoned unjustly. For his crime, he is exiled, albeit with a small fortune and a royal steward to accompany him.

However, after leaving the kingdom, the treacherous steward threatens to murder Roswall if he does not hand over all his possessions and swear to become his servant. The steward, taking Roswall's identity and possessions, abandons the prince to find a finer servant.

After wandering alone and penniless, Roswall finds a city in another kingdom. A woman takes Roswall in and sends him to school with her son. The prince does so well he impresses the school master, who brings him to the king to take into service. The king's daughter Lillian and Roswall fall in love.

However, the future of their love seems ill-fated. A tournament is set to be held to honor Lillian's approaching marriage to a prince from a nearby kingdom. The prince is revealed to be the treacherous steward.

Roswall goes hunting and encounters a white knight from his former kingdom. The knight gives him a horse and armor to use to enter the tournament. Roswall wins but flees before being recognized. The next day, he encounters a gray knight who aids him in the same way, and the third day, a green knight does the same.

The night before the wedding, the knights come to the city and salute the king, queen, and Princess Lillian, but not the steward. When asked why they have broken the custom of saluting the princess's husband-to-be and the son of their king, they say they do not see their king's son. After searching the crowd, however, they identify Roswall as the prince of their kingdom. The king asks him to explain, and the true prince tells his story.

The steward is executed, and Roswall and Lillian marry. Roswall rewards the old woman who had given him shelter, and the royal couple rule wisely and justly.

== History ==
It is "certainly as early as the sixteenth century and perhaps [belonging] to the fifteenth" but found only in printed editions, the earliest dating to 1663.

The ballad The Lord of Lorn and the False Steward, too closely related not to be derived, was entered into the Stationers' Register in 1580.

Sir Walter Scott recounted that within living memory of his time, an old person wandered Edinburgh, singing Roswall and Lillian.

== Motifs ==
Despite its late origin, the tale is rife with motifs deriving from folklore. The rescue of the prisoners, his exile, and their assistance to him is clearly recognizable in such fairy tales as Iron Hans, The Gold-bearded Man, and The Hairy Man, and this friendship is central to the plot.

The Lord of Lorn and the False Steward contains both the treacherous steward and the marriage to the steward interrupted for that of the man he supplanted. Both it and The Goose Girl turn on the revelation that the true royal has been supplanted by a treacherous servant.

Fighting in the three different suits of armor at the tourney resemble those of Ipomedon and Sir Gowther.
