= The Facetious Nights of Straparola =

1550 short story collection by Giovanni Francesco Straparola

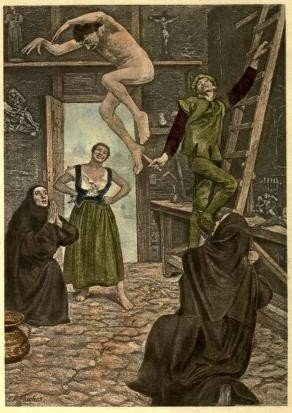
"The Crucifix Comes To Life" Night the Ninth, Sixth Fable Watercolor by E. R. Hughes The Italian Novelists, Volume 3

The Facetious Nights of Straparola (1550–1555; Italian: Le piacevoli notti), also known as The Nights of Straparola, is a two-volume collection of 75 stories by Italian author and fairy-tale collector Giovanni Francesco Straparola. Modeled after Boccaccio's Decameron, it is significant as often being called the first European storybook to contain fairy-tales; it would influence later fairy-tale authors like Charles Perrault and Jacob and Wilhelm Grimm. It contains the earliest Puss in Boots version.

== History ==
The Facetious Nights of Straparola was first published in Italy between 1550–53 under the title Le piacevoli notti ("The Pleasant Nights") containing 74 stories. In 1555 the stories were published in a single volume in which one of the tales was replaced with two new tales, bringing the total to 75. Straparola was translated into Spanish in 1583. In 1624 it was placed on the Index of Prohibited Books.

The work was modeled on Boccaccio's Decameron with a frame narrative and novellas, but it took an innovative approach by also including folk and fairy tales. In the frame narrative, participants of a party on the island of Murano, near Venice, tell each other stories that vary from bawdy to fantastic. The narrators are mostly women, while the men, among whose ranks are included historical men of letters such as Pietro Bembo and Bernardo Cappello, listen. The 74 original tales are told over 13 nights, five tales are told each night except the eighth (six tales) and the thirteenth (thirteen tales). Songs and dances begin each night, and the nights end with a riddle or enigma. The tales include folk and fairy-tales (about 15); Boccaccio-like novellas with themes of trickery and intrigue; and tragic and heroic stories.

The 15 fairy tales were influential with later authors, some were the first recorded instances of now-famous stories, like "Puss in Boots". Many of the tales were later collected or retold in Giambattista Basile’s The Tale of Tales (1634–36) and Jacob and Wilhelm Grimm's Grimm's Fairy Tales (1812–15).

== Fairy tales ==
Fairy tales that originally appeared in Nights of Straparola, with later adaptations by Giambattista Basile, Madame d'Aulnoy, Charles Perrault, Carlo Gozzi, Jacob and Wilhelm Grimm.

Adaptations
ID	Nights of Straparola	d'Aulnoy	Basile	Brothers Grimm	others	Notes (Note: Indicates sources which draw a connection between Straparola and the other folklorists for the given tale(s).)
1.2	Cassandrino			The Master Thief		
1.3	Pre Scarpacifico			Little Farmer		
1.4	Tebaldo and Doralice		The Bear	All-Fur or All-Kinds-of-Fur	Donkeyskin (Charles Perrault)	(Note: German folklorist Hans-Jörg Uther, in his 2004 revision of the Aarne-Thompson Index, separated this tale under a new type: ATU 510B*, "The Princess in the Chest", wherein the princess hides inside a closet or lantern to escape from an unwanted suitor.)
2.1	The Pig King	Prince Marcassin		Hans My Hedgehog		
3.1	Crazy Peter	The Dolphin	Peruonto	Simple Hans		
3.2	Livoretto	The Story of Pretty Goldilocks	Corvetto	Ferdinand the Faithful and Ferdinand the Unfaithful		
3.3	Biancabella and the Snake		Penta of the Chopped-off Hands and The Two Little Pizzas			
3.4	Fortunio			The Nixie of the Mill-Pond		
4.1	Costanza / Costanzo	Belle-Belle ou Le Chevalier Fortuné		How Six Made Their Way in the World		
4.3	Ancilotto, King of Provino	Princess Belle-Etoile		The Three Little Birds	The Dancing Water, the Singing Apple, and the Speaking Bird (Thomas Frederick Crane); The Green Bird (Carlo Gozzi)	
5.1	Guerrino and the Savage Man			Iron Hans		
5.2	Adamantina		The Goose	The Golden Goose		
7.5	The Three Brothers		The Five Sons	The Four Skillful Brothers		
8.4	Maestro Lattantio and His Apprentice Dionigi			The Thief and His Master		
10.3	Cesarino di Berni		The Merchant	The Two Brothers		
11.1	Costantino Fortunato		Cagliuso		Puss in Boots (Charles Perrault)	
