= Sir Gowther =

Middle English romance

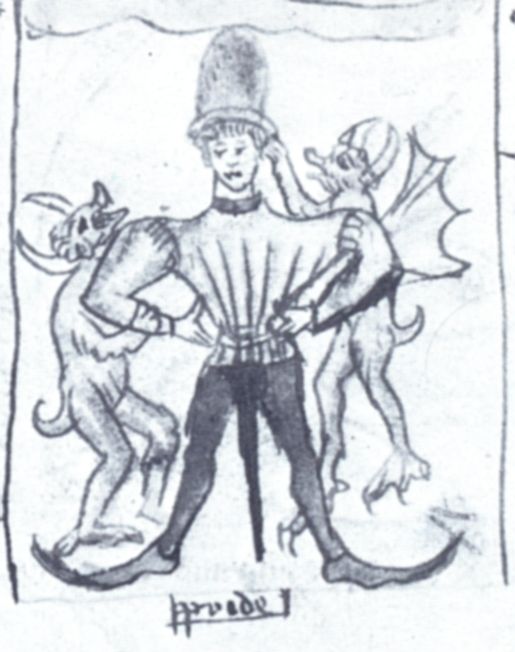
Illustration of pride at folio 47v of British Library Add MS 37049, a fifteenth-century English manuscript. Pride is depicted as a youth in a tall hat, blue puffed jacket, red breeches, long pyked shoes, with a sword, seized by two devils.

Sir Gowther is a relatively short Middle English tail-rhyme romance in twelve-line stanzas, found in two manuscripts, each dating to the mid- or late-fifteenth century. The poem tells a story that has been variously defined as a secular hagiography, a Breton lai and a romance, and perhaps "complies to a variety of possibilities". An adaptation of the story of Robert the Devil, the story follows the fortunes of Sir Gowther from birth to death, from his childhood as the son of a fiend, his wicked early life, through contrition and a penance imposed by the Pope involving him in a lowly and humiliating position in society, and to his eventual rise, via divine miracles, as a martial hero and ultimately to virtual canonization. But despite this saintly end, "like many other lays and romances, Sir Gowther derives much of its inspiration from a rich and vastly underappreciated folk tradition."

== Manuscripts ==
The story of Sir Gowther is found in two manuscripts: British Library Royal MS 17.B.43 and National Library of Scotland MS Advocates 19.3.1. Both of these manuscripts date from the mid- to late-fifteenth century. The romance itself was probably composed in around 1400.

Both instances of this Middle English romance are composed in twelve-line, tail-rhyme stanzas, like many other Middle English romances, such as Ipomadon, Emaré, Sir Launfal and Octavian, each verse rhyming AABCCBDDBEEB. The copy in National Library of Scotland MS Advocates 19.3.1 is 756 lines long.

== Plot ==
(This summary is based upon the copy of Sir Gowther found in National Library of Scotland MS Advocates 19.3.1.)

The Duke of Austria is childless and threatens his wife with divorce if she does not quickly conceive. She is in an orchard one morning when a person she believes to be her husband arrives and they make love beneath the trees. However, she has been the victim of the utmost deception. She has been deceived in much the same way that the Duchess of Tintagel is deceived when King Uther Pendragon, cast into the likeness of her husband by Merlin, fathers King Arthur upon her in the Vulgate Merlin. Like the wife of Sir Orfeo, she is accosted by a fay in an orchard. The anonymous author of Sir Gowther has already told us: "I searched high and low for a Breton lay and have brought out of this marvellous region the following tale:

A law of Breyten long y soghht,
And owt ther of a tale ybroghht,
That lufly is to tell."

The child the lady now carries in her womb is Merlin's half-brother, we are told. But he is a fiendish child. As a baby, he sends numerous wet-nurses to their graves and tears off his mother's nipple on the only occasion she dares to suckle him. As he grows to be a youth, hunting becomes his favourite pastime, but as he nears adulthood he prefers to roam the land with a huge sword, terrorising everybody and in particular, the religious orders. He rapes with relish and then burns a convent of nuns to death. His father is so sickened by his son's behaviour that he dies of shame.

Sir Gowther is now duke after the death of his father. But when he has his fiendish parentage thrown at him in accusation one day, he runs to his mother to find out if it is true. At the point of his sword, she admits to everything and, in a sudden change of heart, Sir Gowther resolves to travel to Rome to receive absolution for his sins from the Pope.

Sir Gowther receives an audience with the Pope and is given the penance that he may not speak and that whatever he swallows must first have been in the mouth of a dog. The curious, possible implications of this are almost corroborated when, having been kept alive for a few days by a greyhound, he dashes into the palace of the Emperor of Germany (the Holy Roman Empire), hides beneath a table and the emperor's steward comes towards him brandishing a stick. However, he is soon adopted by the court as Hob their fool and eats beneath the tables with the dogs in the evening.

The Emperor of Germany has a daughter who is mute, but this does not stop a sultan coming to claim her hand in marriage. The emperor refuses and a dreadful war begins. On three successive days, Sir Gowther, as Hob the fool, prays to God that he might be given arms to help defend the emperor's lands from the heathen hoards. And three times, he is rewarded by the magical appearance of a horse and armour outside his small room. For three days in succession, he sallies out with the emperor's army and fights invincibly, first as a black knight, then as a red knight and finally, on the third day, as a white knight, even managing to cut off the sultan's head during the final day's fighting. Like the Anglo-Norman romance hero Ipomedon, he fights in differently-coloured arms every day and nobody knows who these knights are who have conducted themselves so magnificently on the field of combat. The emperor's daughter, however, knows the truth. However, she is mute and thus unable to tell anyone anything.

But victory comes at a price. Following the sultan's death, on seeing Sir Gowther wounded on the final day of battle, the emperor's daughter, in her anguish, falls from her tower. The Pope is summoned to bury her. But as the funeral is about to start, she awakens from her bier and tells the assembled gathering that God has forgiven Sir Gowther all his sins. He may speak again, and so can she.

Following this miracle, the two are married and, when her father dies, Sir Gowther becomes Emperor of the Holy Roman Empire. He builds an abbey and attaches to it a convent, in which nuns can pray for the souls of the poor nuns he once burnt alive in their church. When Sir Gowther dies, many miracles are witnessed around his tomb.

== Legends ==
The most widely cited source for Sir Gowther is a late-twelfth or early-thirteenth century romance of a fictitious Norman duke named Robert de Diable, a story probably taken from legend. Influences may also be found in the saintly Legend of Gregorius and the Life of Saint Alexius. At one time, the lai was believed to have come from Normandy, but a study published in the 1960s suggests that the fairy tale elements make historical inspiration unlikely and that the tale may have arisen in Italy.

The visit of an other-worldly creature in an orchard, promising a marvelous child, parallels the legends of St. Anne and the birth of the Virgin Mary so closely that there would appear to be influence, especially as these are the closest parallels to be found.

Unsurprisingly, resonances exist in other Breton lais, in particular the twelfth- or thirteenth-century lai Tydorel, which may itself derive from Robert de Diable, The Middle English Breton lai Sir Orfeo also sees the heroine accosted by an Otherworldly figure in an orchard and the Middle English Breton lai Sir Degaré has the hero conceived when his mother is raped in a forest by an Otherworldly knight. The heroine of the Middle English Breton lai Emaré has to suffer a new life in reduced circumstances before gaining acknowledgement of her previous rank.

The late-twelfth century Anglo-Norman romance Ipomedon has the hero fight as an unknown knight on three successive days of a tournament, first as a white knight, then as a red knight and finally as a black knight, in a reversal of an otherwise identical sequence later used by the anonymous author of Sir Gowther. Indeed, the tournament where the hero fights in disguise and claims to have been busy is a fairy tale commonplace (such as in The Golden Crab or The Magician's Horse, or in Little Johnny Sheep-Dung and The Hairy Man, where it is actual battle), and from there passed into romance.

== Two manuscript versions ==
The two manuscript versions, although telling the same story, do so with different emphasis and perhaps with different intention.

=== Social story ===
The version of Sir Gowther in British Library Royal MS 17.B.43 was "probably intended for a more cultured and refined audience" and although it is the version that explicitly identifies Sir Gowther with a saint at the conclusion, may concern itself also with the aristocratic trauma of a dynasty in distress, first by childlessness, then by an 'heir from hell', a son who inherits something of the egocentric arrogance of his forebears. This is resolved in the tale by Sir Gowther descending to be amongst the lowest of the low, eating beneath the table with the dogs; and when at last his fortunes rise again, in the saddle of the white knight, "we are told: 'Rode he not with brag nor bost'", as though this may be significant to the author's intention. The romance may therefore address "deep-seated anxieties in medieval society about breeding and dynasty". The devilish aspect of pride illustrated in the fifteenth-century manuscript illustration at the top of this article may reflect this.

=== Saint’s life ===
The version of Sir Gowther in National Library of Scotland MS Advocates 19.3.1 is told in "a more vigorous and decidedly more explicit manner", like a hagiography. It is in this version alone that the burning of the nuns in their own church is referred to and the ultimate forgiveness of Sir Gowther's heinous crimes by God, through penance and contrition, carry him onwards almost to beatification. Not only does the emperor's mute daughter come back to life to inform him that he is now one of God's children, but further miracles are later seen to occur beside his tomb; although it is only in the British Library Royal MS that Sir Gowther is actually identified with Saint Guthlac, who wore animal skins and lived in a barrow, and for whom King Æthelbald of Mercia founded Croyland Abbey in Lincolnshire, England in the eighth century.

The poem in the British Library version ends: Explicit Vita Sancti.

=== Breton lai ===
Breton elements in the story of Sir Gowther, including references to Arthurian legend in the form of Merlin, supernatural encounters in an orchard, the significant involvement of animals and episodes of disguise, may derive ultimately from a European pagan tradition preserved in the Breton lai.

== In other works ==
- Two different characters named Gowther appear in the 2012 Japanese manga series The Seven Deadly Sins.
