= Mythopoetic men's movement =

American self-help movement

The mythopoetic men's movement was a body of self-help activities and therapeutic workshops and retreats for men undertaken by various organizations and authors in the United States from the early 1980s through the 1990s. The term mythopoetic was coined by professor Shepherd Bliss in preference to New Age men's movement (though "mythopoeia" was coined by J.R.R. Tolkien in the 1930s, and has a different meaning). Mythopoets adopted a general style of psychological self-help inspired by the work of Robert Bly, Robert A. Johnson, Joseph Campbell, and other Jungian authors. The group activities used in the movement were largely influenced by ideas derived from Swiss psychiatrist Carl Gustav Jung, known as Jungian psychology, e.g., Jungian archetypes, from which the use of myths and fairy tales taken from various cultures served as ways to interpret challenges facing men in society.

Groups formed during the mythopoetic men's movement typically avoided political and social advocacy in favor of therapeutic workshops and wilderness retreats, often using Native American rituals such as drumming, chanting, and sweat lodges. These rituals were done with the aim of personal growth of participants with an intended purpose of connecting spiritually with a lost deep masculine identity or inner self. The most well-known text of the movement was Iron John: A Book About Men by the poet Robert Bly, who argued that "the grief in men has been increasing steadily since the start of the Industrial Revolution and the grief has reached a depth now that cannot be ignored." Inspired by how feminists and folklorists such as Marie-Louise von Franz had used myth and legend to empower women in the mid-20th century, Bly envisioned a similar project to positively reimagine masculinity in a way that was distinct from (but not opposed to) the feminist movement. He urged men to recover a pre-industrial conception of masculinity through spiritual camaraderie with other men in male-only gatherings. The purpose of these activities was to foster greater understanding of the forces influencing the roles of men in modern society and how these changes affect behavior, self awareness, and identity.

In analytical psychology (or "Jungian psychology"), the puer aeternus is an example of what Jung considered an archetype, one of the "primordial, structural elements of the human psyche." Jungian psychologist James Hillman incorporates logic and rational thought, as well as reference to case histories of well known people in society, in the discussion of the contemporary male psyche. Hillman has spoken in-depth on subjects such as "the boy inside each of us," and pursues strategies to acknowledge, co-exist, and ultimately father immature parts of men to turn them instead into sources of passion and energy. Hillman's arguments are considered to be in line with the consideration of a puer aeternus or "eternal youth" archetype.

Sometimes mistakenly referred to simply as the men's movement, which is much broader, the mythopoetic movement is best known for the rituals that take place during their gatherings. The movement faded from the public eye after the 90s, however, The ManKind Project today has similar ideals at its core, also influenced by Bly's work.

== Tenets and practices ==
According to sociologist Michael Messner, mythopoets believe that the rise of the urban industrial society "trapped men into straitjackets of rationality, thus blunting the powerful emotional communion and collective spiritual transcendence that they believe men in tribal societies typically enjoyed". The movement seeks to restore the "deep masculine" to men who have lost it in their more modern lifestyles.

Other causes claimed by advocates for the loss of the "deep masculine" include:

- Men no longer being comrades who celebrated their masculinity together. Rather, they had become competitors within their workplaces.
- Men spending more time in their houses with women than they did with men (in non-competitive terms outside of work). Excessive interaction with women generally kept men from realizing their internal masculinity.
- Feminism bringing attention to the 'feminine voice.' Through this, the mythopoetic men felt that their voices had been muted (though Bly and others are careful in not blaming feminism for this).
- The separation of men from their fathers kept them from being truly initiated into manhood, and was a source of emotional damage.
- Men were suffering further emotional damage due to feminist accusations about sexism. Men should celebrate their differences from women, rather than feeling guilty about them.
- Men being discouraged from expressing their emotions. Male inexpressivity is an epidemic and does not correspond to their "deep masculine" natures.

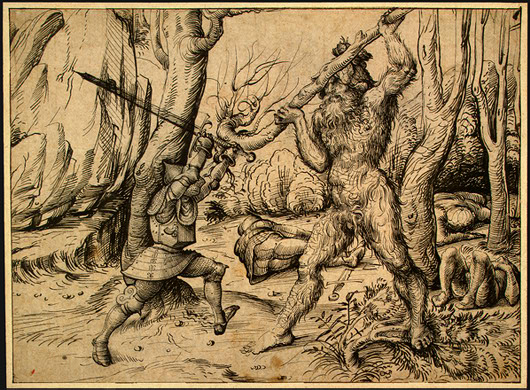
The Fight in the Forest (Hans Burgkmair, ca. 1500/1503), illustrating the tale of Iron John

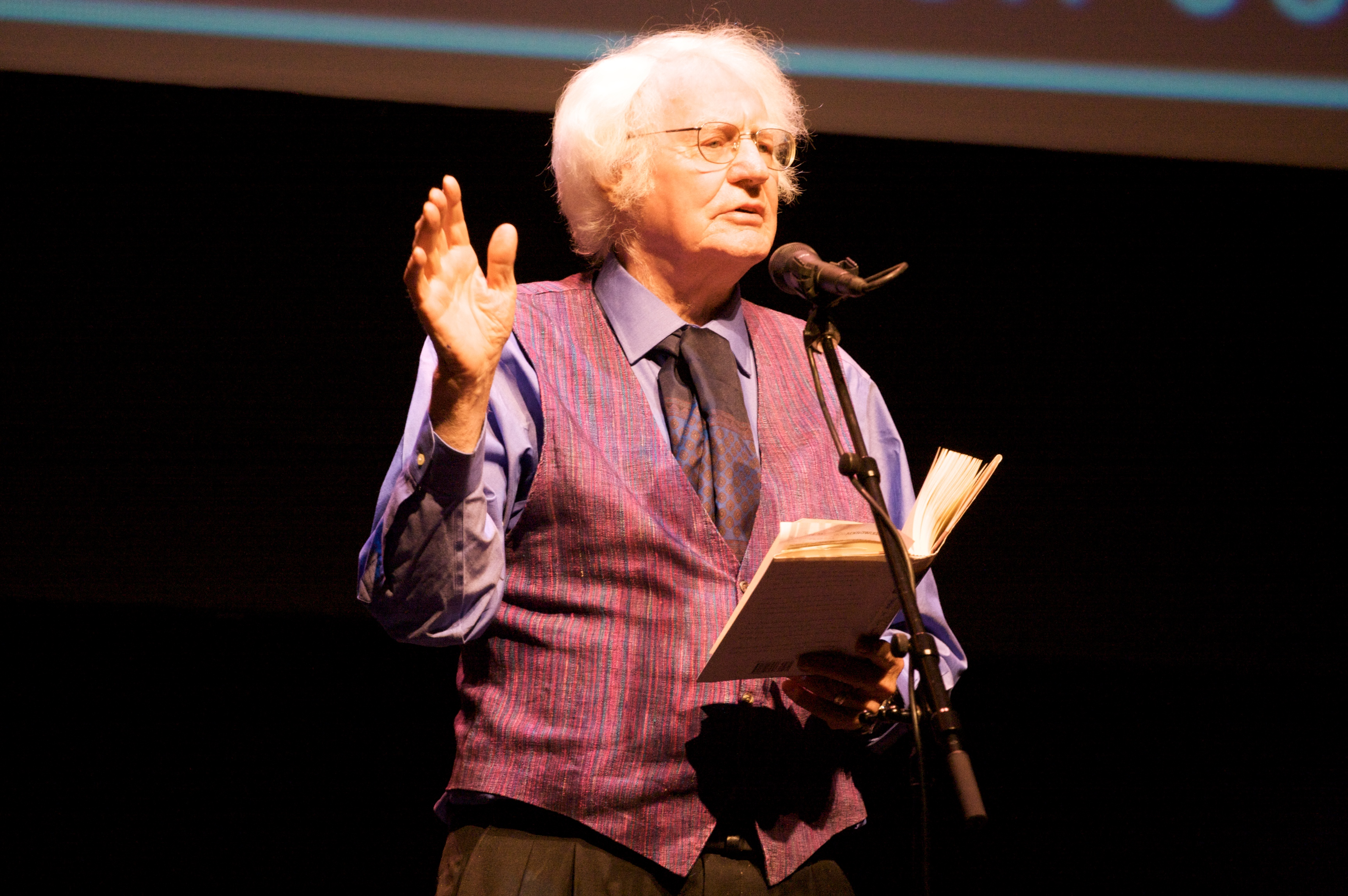
Poet Robert Bly.

The mythopoetic men's movement spawned a variety of self-help groups and workshops, led by authors such as Robert Bly, Michael J. Meade and Robert L. Moore. Among its famous advocates was the poet Bly, whose book Iron John: A Book About Men (1990) spent 62 weeks on The New York Times Best Seller list, being an exegesis of the tale of "Iron John" collected by the Brothers Grimm. Groups of men from the professional class retreated from their female loved ones in order to join in spiritual rituals that emphasized homosociality, with the central goal of reclaiming the parts of their masculinity that they had lost called the "deep masculine."

In the mythopoetic movement, the desire to be spiritual and yet manly is also a factor in the way the group understands the nature of gender and relationships between the sexes. The mythopoetic movement tends to regard gender as biological realities, "hardwired" into the psyches of men and women. This gender essentialism is consistent with the Jungian philosophy undergirding the movement. Mythopoetic men thus speak of the need to recover "deep masculinity," to distinguish what they regard as genuine or mature masculinity from the problematic toxic masculinity of immature males.

Because most men no longer perform masculine rituals, mythopoets assert that men have mutated into destructive, hypermasculine chauvinists, or, in the opposite direction, have become too feminized. The mythopoetic men performed rituals at these gatherings, which were meant to imitate those performed by tribal societies when men initiated boys into a deeply essential natural manhood. The movement emphasized the importance of including multiple generations of men in the rituals, so that the men could learn about masculinity from those who were older and wiser.

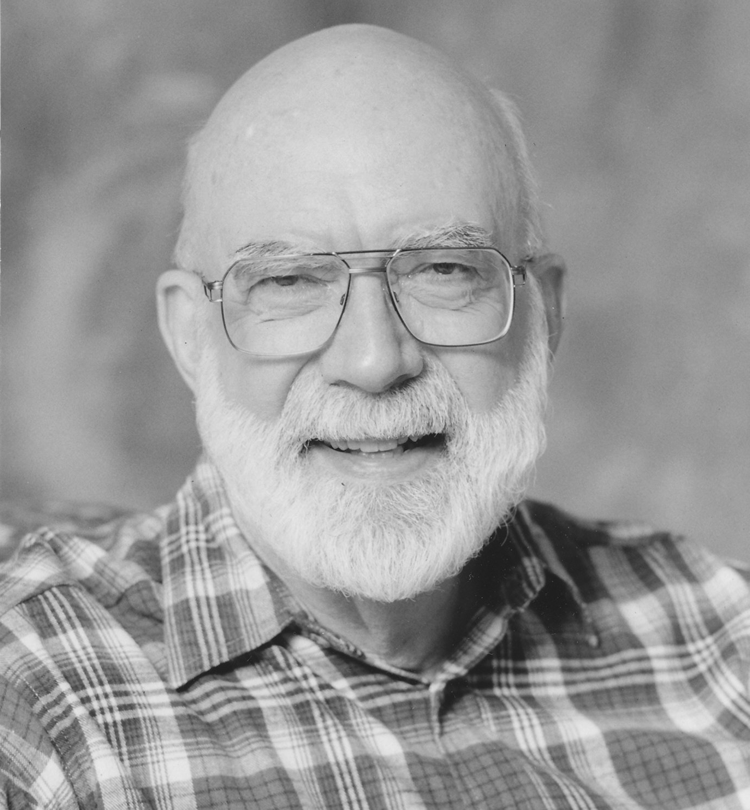
Author Michael Harner.

Characteristic of the early mythopoetic movement was a tendency to retell myths, legends and folktales, and engage in their exegesis as a tool for personal insight. Using frequent references to archetypes as drawn from Jungian analytical psychology, the movement focused on issues of gender role, gender identity and wellness for the modern man (and woman). Advocates would often engage in storytelling with music, these acts being seen as a modern extension to a form of "new age shamanism" popularized by Michael Harner at approximately the same time. The movement sought to empower men by means of equating archetypal characters with their own emotions and abilities. For instance, Michael Messner describes the concept of "Zeus energy" as emphasizing "male authority accepted for the good of the community". (Note: Messner argues that while movement participants may benefit from the nurturing acknowledgement of shared pain among men, the promotion of "male authority" rooted in a stereotypical male–female duality represents a new form of hegemonic masculinity.) Beliefs about the emotional system based in archetypes of great men, mythopoets sought to channel these characters in themselves, so that they could unleash their "animal-males". This group primarily analyzed the archetypes of King, Warrior, Magician, Lover and Wildman.

Some academic work came from the movement, as well as the creation of various magazines, continuing annual conferences based on Robert Bly's vision for creative communities such as Minnesota Men's Conference and the Great Mother and New Father Conference, and non-profit organizations doing related work like the ManKind Project and Micheal Meade's Mosaic Multicultural Foundation. Mythopoetic practices among women's groups and feminists were more commonly seen as part of a more general "women's spirituality".

== Politics ==
As a self-help movement, the mythopoetic movement tends not to take explicit stances on political issues such as feminism, gay rights or family law (such as the issues of divorce, domestic violence or child custody), preferring instead to stay focused on emotional and psychological well-being. Because of this neutrality, the movement became a target of social criticism, and was often characterized as anti-intellectual as well as apolitical.

== See also ==
- Masculism
- Men's movement
- Robert Bly
