= Giovanni Francesco Straparola =

Italian writer and fairy tale collector (c. 1485–1558)

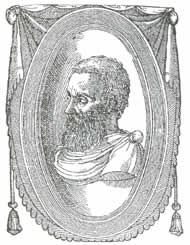
Giovanni Francesco Straparola

Giovanni Francesco "Gianfrancesco" Straparola, also known as Zoan or Zuan Francesco Straparola da Caravaggio (ca. 1485–1558), was an Italian writer of poetry, and collector and writer of short stories. Some time during his life, he migrated from Caravaggio to Venice where he published a collection of stories in two volumes called The Facetious Nights or The Pleasant Nights. This collection includes some of the first known printed versions of fairy tales in Europe, as they are known today.

== Biography ==
=== Life ===
Not much is known of Straparola's life except for a few facts regarding his published works. He was likely born some time around 1485 in Caravaggio, Italy (on the Lombard plain east of Milan). However, nothing more is known of his life until 1508 when he was found to be in Venice where he signed his name "Zoan" on the title page of his Opera nova de Zoan Francesco Straparola da Caravaggio novamente stampata (New Works).

Prior to issuing the first volume of The Pleasant Nights, Straparola obtained permission to publish from the Venetian authorities on March 8, 1550, though the name on the permission reads "Zuan Francesco Sstraparola da Caravaggio."

Straparola was said to have died in 1558. But his death may have occurred earlier as after the 1556 or 1557 print run, the woodcut portrait of the author disappeared from the work as well as the words "All’instanza dall’autore" (at the behest of the author), the printer being Comin da Trino, Venice. This possibly could put Straparola's death prior to 1558 (Bottigheimer suggests 1555 due to the plague at that time, and in some city other than Venice as his death is not recorded in the death records of Venice in the 1550s or early 1560s.

As a lettered man not native to Venice, Straparola may have held the position of teacher, private secretary, or a type of ‘ghost writer’ for a patron.

=== Name ===
The name "Straparola" is unlikely to be Giovanni Francesco's real name. Bottigheimer suggests "Straparola" is a nickname derived from the Italian verb straparlare, meaning "to talk too much" or "to talk nonsense". Zipes has the name meaning "loquacious". The use of a nickname is understandable as the publishing of satirical writings in sixteenth-century Venice often held personal danger for the author.

== Writings ==
=== New Works ===
In Venice in 1508, Straparola published his Opera nova de Zoan Francesco Straparola da Caravazo novamente stampata (New Works), which contained sonnets, strambotti (satirical verse), epistre (epistles), and capitoli (satirical poetry). It was reprinted in 1515.

=== The Facetious Nights ===
In 1551, also in Venice, Straparola published the first volume of his Le Piacevoli Notti Di M. Giovanfrancesco Straparola da Caravaggio, which is often translated as The Pleasant Nights or The Facetious Nights, the second volume of this work appearing in 1553.

The Pleasant Nights is the work for which Straparola is most noted, and which contains a total of seventy-five short stories, fables, and fairy tales (Straparola 1894, vol.1 has 25; vol. 2 has 50). The tales, or novelle, are divided into Nights, rather than chapters, and resemble the type of narrative presentation found in Boccaccio's Decameron (1350–52). This presentation is of a gathering of Italian aristocrats, men and women, who entertain themselves by singing songs, dancing, and telling stories, The Pleasant Nights having added enigmas (riddles). [Compare Boccaccio 2010 with Straparola 1894.]

One story in the second book of The Pleasant Nights, "The Tailor's Apprentice" or "Maestro Lattantio and His Apprentice Dionigi" (Straparola 1984 vol. 2, 102–110.), was removed a few years after first appearing in the second volume due to Church influence, while the entire collection entered a number of Indexes of prohibited books between 1580 and 1624.

It is claimed that many of the stories in The Pleasant Nights had been taken from earlier works, specifically from Girolamo Morlini, a 15th/16th century lawyer from Naples whose Novellae, fabulae, comoedia appeared in 1520. Today, in at least one instance, the name of Girolamo Morlini has been associated in print with The Facetious Nights.

If taken at his word, Straparola never denied this. In the Dedication at the front of the second volume, Straparola wrote that the stories ". . . written and collected in this volume [vol. 2 only?] are none of mine, but goods which I have feloniously taken from this man and that. Of a truth I confess they are not mine, and if I said otherwise I should lie, but nevertheless I have faithfully set them down according to the manner in which they were told by the ladies, nobles, learned men and gentlemen who gathered together for recreation." Zipes even mentioned at one time that "Straparola was not an original writer." It was often the case in Renaissance Italy that the use of the "frame tale" allowed an author to dodge some of the criticism for printing stories from other writers by disclaiming original authorship, saying they only wrote down what they heard.

Though this Dedication is signed "From Giovanni Francesco Straparola," Bottigheimer suggests that changes in narrative style between volume 1 and 2, both within the stories themselves and the frame tale, imply that someone other than Straparola could have worked on or finished the second volume, taking some of the stories at random from Morlini's Novellea.

== Fairy tales ==
Straparola's Pleasant Nights is the first known work where fairy tales as they are known today appeared in print. Zipes lists these as being:

- "Cassandrino" ("The Master Thief") [1: 20–27]
- "Pre Scarpafico" ("The Priest Scarpafico") [1: 28–34]
- "Tebaldo" ("Doralice") [1: 35–44]
- "Galeotto" ("The Pig King" or "Prince Pig") [1: 58–66]
- "Pietro" ("Peter the Fool") [1: 102–110]
- "Biancabella" ("Biancabella and the Snake") [1: 125–139]
- "Fortunio" ("Fortunio and the Siren") [1: 140–152]
- "Ricardo" ("Costanza/Costanzo") [1: 167–178]
- "Aciolotto" ("Ancilotto, King of Provino" [?]) [1: 186–198]
- "Guerrino" ("Guerrino and the Savage Man") [1: 221–236]
- "I tre fratelli" ("The Three Brothers") [2: 71–74]
- "Maestro Lattantio" ("The Tailor's Apprentice" or "Maestro Lattantio and His Apprentice Dionigi") [2: 102–110]
- "Cesarino" ("Cesarino the Dragon Slayer") [2: 182–191]
- "Soriana" ("Costantino Fortunato") [2: 209–214]

The numbers in brackets refers to the volume and the pages in Straparola 1894. Why "Livoretto" [1: 110–125] and "Adamantina and the Doll" [1: 236–245] are not included is not explained.

=== Invention of the rise tale ===
With regard to the plots used within fairy tales, it has been suggested that Straparola might have created the "rise plot" or "rise tale" often seen in fairy tales today. The "rise" plot takes a poor person—man or woman, girl or boy—and through the use of magic they obtain a marriage that leads to wealth: "rags-magic-marriage-riches". However, this has yet to be satisfactorily established.

The stories of Straparola that can be considered ‘rise’ tales include "Peter the Fool": through the auspices of a talking fish and its magic powers, a town fool rises to be a king; "Fortunio and the Siren": an orphaned boy uses magic powers transferred to him by animals to secure a royal marriage; "Adamantina and the Doll": a magic doll aids two women in securing royal marriages; and "Costantino Fortunato": a talking cat gains marriage and wealth for her master.

== Effect on later writers ==
Mme. de Murat (1670–1716), herself a writer of fairy tales, is noted as remarking in 1699 "that everybody, including herself, was taking their stories from ‘Straparola.’" Some of Straparola's tales or their plot elements can indeed be found in the works of later authors. Please note that these similarities alone do not confirm the claim that any of the plots or plotlines in The Pleasant Nights originated with Straparola.

Giambattista Basile's (1575?–1632) "Peruonto" and Mme d’Aulnoy's (1650?–1705) "The Dolphin," contain most of the same storyline as Straparola's "Peter the Fool", though the two former are studded with added morality: a foolish/ugly protagonist releases a fish/dolphin with magic powers that grants whatever is asked of it. (Compare Basile 2007, 32–41 and d’Aulnoy 1892, 509–535 with Straparola 1894, 1: 102–110.)

Both Basile's "Cagliuso" and Charles Perrault's (1628–1703) "The Master Cat, or Puss in Boots" follow the same plotlines as Straparola's "Costantino Fortunato:" the protagonist inherits a talking cat that gains a royal marriage and wealth for her/his master. (Compare Basile 2007, 145–150 and Perrault 1969, 45–57 with Straparola 1894 2: 209–214.)

"Der Eisenhans" ("Iron Jack") in Grimm (1785–1863 & 1786–1859) contains the same basic plot as that of "Guerrino and the Savage Man:" the protagonist is helped in his quest(s) by a wild or savage man he sets free. (Compare Grimm 1972, 612–620 with Straparola 1894 1: 221–236.) The Brothers Grimm never invented fairy-tales, they exclusively collected and published folktales which had been passed on from generation to generation. This fact indicates that "Guerrino" is one of Straparola's collected folktales rather than one of his invented literary fairy-tales.

The plot in Straparola's "Ancilotto" is followed closely, with some differing details, in "The Dancing Water, the Singing Apple, and the Speaking Bird" as found in Joseph Jacobs's collection of 1916: to prevent a king from meeting with his children, they’re sent on near-impossible quests. (Compare Straparola 1894 vol. 1: 186–198 with Jacobs 1916, 51–65.) In this same collection of Jacob's is the story "The Master Thief," which follows the same plot as Straparola's "Cassandrino the Thief": a magistrate or lord has a thief prove how good he is or will be killed. (Compare Jacobs 1916, 121–128 with Straparola 1894 1: 20–27.)

Basile's ‘The Goose’ follows the same plotline as Straparola's "Adamantina and the Doll": a doll/goose that grants bounty to two poor sisters ultimately leads them to marrying royally. (Compare Basile 2007, 397–401 with Straparola 1894 1: 236–245.)

Italo Calvino was inspired by Straparola in the curation of his work Fiabe italiane.

== Works by Straparola ==
- New Works (1508)
- The Pleasant Nights vol. 1 (1551) and vol. 2 (1553)

== See also ==
- Charles Perrault
- Giambattista Basile
