= Puss in Boots =

European fairy tale about a cat

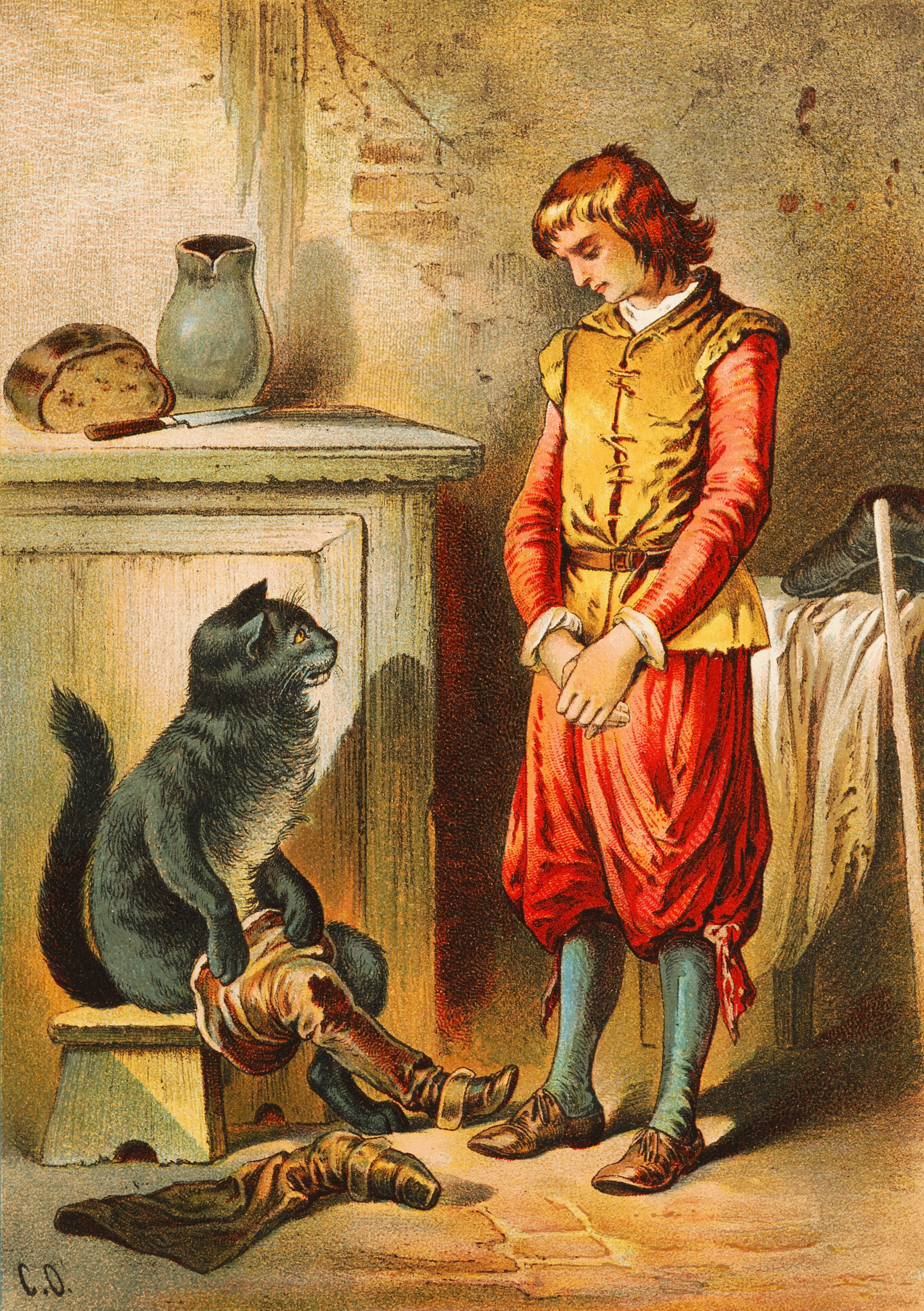
- The cat and his young master by Carl Offterdinger
- Country: Italy (1550) France (1697)
- Language: Italian (originally)
- Genre: Literary fairy tale

Publication
- Publication type: Fairy tale collection

"Puss in Boots" (German: Der gestiefelte Kater; French: Le Maître chat ou le Chat botté; Italian: Il gatto con gli stivali; Dutch: De Gelaarsde Kat) is a European fairy tale about an anthropomorphic cat who uses trickery and deceit to gain power, wealth, and the hand in marriage of a princess for his penniless and low-born master.

The oldest written telling is Costantino Fortunato (Italian for "Lucky Costantino") by Italian author Giovanni Francesco Straparola, included in The Facetious Nights of Straparola (c. 1550–1553). In this version, the cat is a disguised fairy who helps his owner, a poor boy named Costantino from Bohemia, in earning the princess' hand by duping a king, a lord, and many commoners. Another version was published in 1634 by Giambattista Basile with the title Cagliuso. The most popular version of the tale was published in French in 1697 by Charles Perrault (1628–1703), a retired civil servant and member of the Académie française.

Puss in Boots appears in DreamWorks' Shrek franchise, appearing in all three sequels to the original film, as well as two spin-off films, Puss in Boots (2011) and Puss in Boots: The Last Wish (2022), where he is voiced by Antonio Banderas. The character is signified in the logo of Japanese anime studio Toei Animation, and is also a popular pantomime in the UK.

== Plot ==
The story begins with a poor miller who, upon his death, leaves his possessions to his three sons. The eldest inherits the mill, the second son gets a donkey, and the youngest son is left with only a cat. The youngest son laments his poor inheritance, but the cat, who turns out to be extraordinarily clever and resourceful, assures his master that he can bring him great fortune if provided with a pair of boots and a simple sack.

Once outfitted with boots, Puss sets out to catch game, such as rabbits and partridges, by using cunning traps. He presents these animals as gifts to the king, claiming they are from his master, who he names the "Marquis of Carabas". Over time, Puss builds a reputation for his master as a wealthy and generous nobleman, even though his master is actually a poor miller’s son.

One day, knowing the king and his daughter will be riding by the river, Puss instructs his master to bathe in the water. As the king's carriage approaches, Puss pretends that his master has been robbed of his fine clothes and is drowning. The king stops to help and, believing Puss’s story, offers his own fine garments to the miller’s son. Impressed by the supposed Marquis's appearance and the many gifts he had previously received, the king invites him into his carriage. The princess becomes enamored with the young man.

While traveling, Puss races ahead to a grand castle owned by a powerful and fearsome ogre who has magical powers, including the ability to shapeshift. Puss flatters the ogre and tricks him into transforming into a small mouse, which Puss immediately devours. With the ogre gone, Puss claims the castle and its lands for his master.

When the king arrives at the castle and sees its magnificence, he is further convinced of the Marquis's wealth and status. Delighted, he offers his daughter's hand in marriage to the miller's son. The marriage is celebrated with a grand feast, and the miller's son, now truly the "Marquis of Carabas", lives happily ever after with the princess, thanks to the cleverness and loyalty of Puss in Boots, who himself becomes a lord and never has to hunt mice again—unless he wants to for fun.

== Analysis ==
=== Tale type ===
In folkloristics, Puss in Boots is classified as Aarne–Thompson–Uther ATU 545B, "Puss in Boots", a subtype of ATU 545, "The Cat as Helper". Folklorists Joseph Jacobs and Stith Thompson point that the Perrault tale is the possible source of the Cat Helper story in later European folkloric traditions. Similarly, Frisian professor Jurjen van der Kooi noted that variants from oral tradition were only starting to be recorded from the 19th century onwards, and tales from Central and Western Europe follow Perrault's and Grimm's redaction very closely. In the same vein, French folklorists Paul Delarue and Marie-Louise Ténèze, editors of the French Folktale Catalogue, concur that oral variants where the cat appears as the helper (especially those in which he wears boots) were influenced by Perrault's tale.

=== Motifs ===
==== The animal helper ====
According to scholars (e.g., van der Kooi, Hans-Jörg Uther, Stith Thompson and Ines Köhler-Zülch), while the cat appears mostly in Europe as the animal helper, variants across cultures replace the cat with a jackal, a fox or another species of animal, like a dog, a rooster, or an ape. German folklorist Köhler-Zulch noted the geographical distribution of the different animal helpers: a fox in Eastern and Southeastern Europe, as well in the Caucasus and Central Asia; and an ape, a jackal or a gazelle in Southern Asia and in Africa. For instance, professor Damiana Eugenio remarked that the helpful animal is a monkey "in all Philippine variants".

In the Hungarian National Catalogue of Folktales (MNK), in tale type 545B, A csizmás kandúr ("The (Tom)cat with boots"), the protagonist may be helped either by a cat or a rooster received from his father as his inheritance, or rescues a fox from peril (e.g., starvation or hunters), and the animal promises to help him in return.

According to Swedish scholar Waldemar Liungman, a cycle of tales that developed in Northern Europe involves the spirit of a dead man instead of a cat. This cycle is found in Denmark, Finland and Estonia.

==== The fox helper ====
French folklorists Paul Delarue and Marie-Louise Ténèze, editors of the French Folktale Catalogue, argued that the existence of variants with a helpful fox instead of a cat indicate an "oral tradition [that is] independent from the printed versions". As such, they locate such variants in - besides some tales in France - peninsular Italy, in Sicily, Serbia, Bulgaria, Romania, Russia, Finland, Turkey and Mongolia. Similarly, folklorist Erika Taube noted that "the Asian Central version" has the fox instead of the cat, a feature that also appears in Eastern Europe.

According to the description of the tale type in the East Slavic Folktale Catalogue (Russian: СУС, romanized: SUS), last updated by scholar Lev Barag in 1979, the hero may be helped either by a cat (Russian: кот), or by a fox (Russian: лиса). Similarly, the Bulgarian Folktale Catalogue names type 545B as Воденичарят и лисицата ("The Miller and the Fox").

In the Typen türkischer Volksmärchen ("Turkish Folktale Catalogue"), by Wolfram Eberhard and Pertev Naili Boratav, both scholars listed the variants with the fox as the animal helper under Turkish type TTV 34, Der Müller und der Fuchs ("The Miller and the Fox"), which corresponds in the international classification to tale type ATU 545B.

Hungarian orientalist László L. Lőrincz established the classification of the Mongolian tale corpus. In his system, the story appears as type 32, Der Dank des schlauen roten Fuchs ("The grateful, sly red fox"), in two variations: the fox replaces the cat as the protagonist's helper; the protagonist either hunts the fox himself and releases it (variation "A"), or he hides the fox from a hunter (variation "B"); in return, the red fox helps the protagonist marry a khan's daughter.

Tales of the Caucasian Region also register the fox in the place of the cat. For example, Georgian scholarship registers tale type ATU 545B in Georgia, with the name "The Fox and the Peasant", wherein the cat is replaced by the helpful fox. Similarly, in the index of Adyghe folktale corpus, a fox helps a poor carpenter to marry the daughter of a knyaz (lord), and in the Azerbaijani Folktale Index, in Azeri type 545B, Armudan bəy, the fox helps the miller's son in marrying the padishah's daughter.

=== Distribution ===
The tale has also spread to the Americas, and is known in Asia (India, Indonesia and Philippines). Greek scholar Marianthi Kaplanoglou states that the tale type ATU 545B, "Puss in Boots" (or, locally, "The Helpful Fox"), is an "example" of "widely known stories (...) in the repertoires of Greek refugees from Asia Minor".

== Adaptations ==
The saying "enough to make a cat laugh" dates from the mid-1800s and is associated with the tale of Puss in Boots.

The Bibliothèque de Carabas book series was published by David Nutt in London in the late 19th century, in which the front cover of each volume depicts Puss in Boots reading a book.
