= Guerrino and the Savage Man =

Italian fairy tale

Folk tale
- Name: Guerrino and the Savage Man
- Aarne–Thompson grouping: ATU 502, "The Wild Man as a Helper"
- Country: Italy
- Published in: The Facetious Nights of Straparola

Guerrino and the Savage Man is an Italian literary fairy tale written by Giovanni Francesco Straparola in The Facetious Nights of Straparola.

It is Aarne-Thompson type 502 titled "The Wild Man as a Helper" and is the oldest known written variant of it. Other tales of this type include Iron John and Georgic and Merlin.

== Synopsis ==
King Filippomaria has an only son named Guerrino. One day while hunting, the king captures a big, tall, deformed wild man. Imprisoning him, he gives the keys to the queen. He goes out hunting again, and Guerrino wants to see the wild man. The wild man steals an arrow he carried and promises to give it back if Guerrino will free him. Guerrino does so and warns him to flee. The wild man does just that.

The queen awakes and questions everyone about the escape. Guerrino tells her that he did it. The queen takes two faithful servants, gives them money, and sends Guerrino away, fearing what the king might do to punish him. King Filippomaria returns and finds the wild man gone. The queen tells him that Guerrino freed him and then that she has sent him away, which enrages the king, that she would think he would hold his son in less regard than the wild man. King Filippomaria searches for him, but does not find him.

The servants decide to kill Guerrino, but cannot agree on how to divide the loot. A fine young man greets them and asks to come with him, and Guerrino agrees. This is the wild man, who previously took to the wild after despairing of winning the love of a lady. He met a fairy suffering from a abscess. She laughed so hard at the sight of him that it burst the abscess, restoring her health. As a reward, she transformed his appearance and gave him magic powers and a magic horse.

They come to the town of Irlanda, ruled by King Zifroi, who has two beautiful daughters, Potentiana and Eleuteria. The lands were under attack by a wild horse and a wild mare that ruin the crops and kill beasts, men, and women. The two servants tell King Zifroi that Guerrino had boasted that he could kill these horses, hoping to see Guerrino killed, leaving them to share his treasure. King Zifroi summons him and promises to reward him if he does so. Guerrino hesitates when King Zifroi threatens to execute him if he does not. The young man tells him to get a blacksmith to make enormous horseshoes with sharp spikes for the young man's magic horse. Then he tells Guerrino to ride his horse until he spots the wild horse, at which point he should dismount, free the magic horse, and climb a tree. The two horses fight, and the wild one is defeated. King Zifroi is pleased, but the scheming servants are furious. They say that Guerrino had boasted likewise of the wild mare and King Zifroi sets him to defeat it as well. He does this the same way.

The night after, he is woken by a noise; finding a wasp in a honey pot, he frees it.

King Zifroi summons him and offers him one of his daughters if Guerrino can tell which of the veiled women is Potentiana, who has golden hair, and which is Eleuteria, who has silver hair. If he guesses wrong, he will be executed. Guerrino goes back to his lodgings, where the young man tells him that the wasp he freed will fly three times around Potentiana, and she will drive it off three times. Guerrino says he does not know how he can reward him for his favors. The young man tells him that he was the wild man and so he is just repaying Guerrino for freeing him, and his name is Rubinetto.

Guerrino goes to the palace, where the princesses are entirely covered with white veils. The wasp buzzes about Potentiana, and she drives it off. Guerrino says she is Potentiana, and they marry. Rubinetto marries Eleuteria. King Filippomaria and his wife hear about Guerrino's exploits, and he returns to them with his wife and Rubinetto and his wife, and they lived in happiness.

== See also ==
- The Magician's Horse
- The Hairy Man
- Dapplegrim
- The Little Girl Sold with the Pears
- Thirteenth
- Boots and the Troll
- The Grateful Beasts
- Esben and the Witch
- The Gold-bearded Man
