= Iron John: A Book About Men =

Book by Robert Bly

Iron John
- Author: Robert Bly
- Language: English
- Subject: Iron John
- Publisher: Addison-Wesley
- Publication date: 1990
- Media type: Print
- Pages: 268
- ISBN: 978-0-201-51720-0

Iron John: A Book About Men is a book by American poet Robert Bly. It is an exegesis of Iron John, a parable belonging to the Grimms' Fairy Tales (1812) by German folklorists Brothers Grimm about a boy maturing into adulthood with help of the wild man.

Published in 1990 by Addison-Wesley, the book is Bly's best-known work, having spent 62 weeks on The New York Times Best Seller list and went on to become a pioneering work in the mythopoetic men's movement.

== Analysis ==
Bly used Jungian psychology applied to myths, legends, and fairy tales to analyze Iron John, so as to find lessons especially meaningful to men and the men's movement.

Bly believed that the fairy tale of Iron John contained lessons from the past of great importance to modern men, which could provide positive images of masculinity—such as that of Zeus energy—in an increasingly feminist age. He considered Iron John to be an archetype of the Self, and the hero's interactions with him to represent a katabasis, or exploratory journey into the inner depths, where new sources of positive masculine sexuality could be found and tapped.

Bly also stressed in the book the need in consciousness raising to accept the father's world, the paternal values of limitation, sobriety, and authority; and warned against the dangers of the high-flying ascensionist who is "flying away from the father, not toward him...the psychology of men like Thoreau determined to have a higher consciousness than their fathers".

== Origins and development ==
Bly built upon material in "What Do Men Really Want?: A New Age Interview With Robert Bly" by Keith Thompson, New Age Journal, May 1982, and which first appeared as a series of pamphlets. The cover of his book was illustrated by Bruce Waldman; while the 2004 edition (ISBN 0306813769, Da Capo Press), comes with a new preface by the author. In 1993 a full-length critique of the book was published by Charles Upton.

== Reception ==
Author Tom Butler-Bowdon says that, in a nutshell, Bly reveals that "Through old stories we can resurrect the ancient and deep power of the masculine".

The American poet Charles Upton considered Bly's approach self-defeating in its efforts to redefine masculinity by a regressive return to the primitive "wild" self. In 2019, journalist Hephzibah Anderson wrote that the book had not aged well: "its flaws have been magnified by the passage of time. […] We may well need to redefine masculinity, but re-wilding doesn't seem the optimal way of going about it".

== See also ==
- D. H. Lawrence
- The Imaginary
- Zorba the Greek
