= The Magician's Horse =

Lithuanian fairy tale

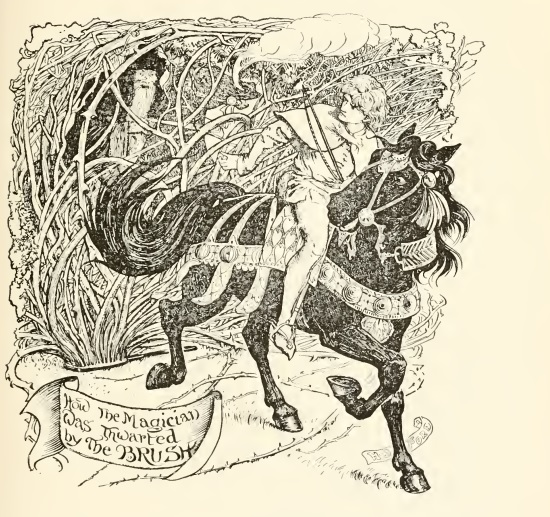
- The youth and the horse leave the Magician behind the thicket of thorns. Illustration by Henry Justice Ford for The Grey Fairy Book (1900).

Folk tale
- Name: The Magician's Horse
- Also known as: The Prince Who Worked as Satan's Servant and Saved the King from Hell
- Aarne–Thompson grouping: ATU 314, "Goldener"
- Region: Lithuania
- Published in: Litauische Volkslieder und Märchen by August Leskien (1882); The Grey Fairy Book, by Andrew Lang
- Related: Little Johnny Sheep-Dung; The Gifts of the Magician; The Black Colt; Donotknow; Kibaraka

The Prince Who Worked as Satan's Servant and Saved the King from Hell (Lithuanian: Apė karaliūnaitį, kur pas šėtoną slūžyjo ir karalių išgelbėjo iš peklos; German: Von dem Prinzen der bei dem Satan in Diensten stand und den König aus der Hölle befreite) is a Lithuanian fairy tale collected by German linguists August Leskien and Karl Brugmann. Andrew Lang included it in The Grey Fairy Book under the title The Magician's Horse.

The story is classified in the international Aarne-Thompson-Uther Index as ATU 314, "Goldener" (previously, "The Youth Transformed to a Horse"), in a cycle that begins with the protagonist working for the antagonist and escaping from him on a talking horse.

== Synopsis ==
A king's three sons went hunting, and the youngest got lost. He arrived at a great hall, ate there and found an old man. After explaining his predicament, the prince offered to enter his service. The old man assigned him to keep the stove lit, fetch firewood from the forest, and care for a black horse in the stables.

The old man was a magician and the fire was the source of his power, though he did not tell the prince.

One day, the prince nearly let the fire go out and the old man stormed in. Frightened, the prince threw another log on it and nursed it back.

The black horse told him to saddle and bridle it, to use an ointment that made his hair like gold, and to pile all the wood he could on the fire. This set the hall on fire. The black horse then told him to take a looking-glass, a brush and a riding-whip, and ride off on him. The magician chased on a roan horse, but the prince threw down the looking glass, the roan horse cut its feet on it, and the magician had to go back to put new shoes on him, but then he chased the prince again. The black horse had the prince throw the brush on the ground. This produced a thick wood and the magician had to go back and get an axe to cut through it, but then he chased the prince again. The prince threw down the whip; it became a river. When the magician tried to cross it, it put out his magical fire and killed him.

The black horse told the prince to strike the ground with a willow wand. A door opened, making a hall in which the black horse stayed, but he sent the prince through the fields to take service with a king. He wore a scarf to hide his golden hair. He worked as a gardener and every day brought half his food to the horse.

One day, the black horse told him that the king's three daughters would choose their husbands: a great company of lords would gather, and they would throw their diamond apples into the air. The man at whose feet the apple stopped would be the bridegroom. He should be in the garden, nearby, and the youngest's would roll to him; he should take it up at once.

He did. The scarf slipped a little, the princess saw his hair and fell in love at once, and the king, though reluctant, let them marry.

Soon after, the king had to go to war. He gave the prince a broken-down nag. The prince went to the black horse where it gave him arms and armor and he rode it to battle and won the battle, but fled before he could be clearly seen. Twice more, he went to war, but the third time, he was wounded, and the king bound his wound with his own handkerchief. The princess, his wife, recognized it and revealed it to her father. There was great rejoicing and the king gave him half his kingdom.

== Analysis ==
=== Tale type ===
The tale is classified in the international Aarne-Thompson-Uther Index as type ATU 314, "The Goldener" (previously, "The Youth Transformed to a Horse"): a youth with golden hair works as the king's gardener. The type may also open with the prince for some reason being the servant of an evil being, where he gains the same gifts, and the tale proceeds as in this variant.

The tale's collectors, August Leskien and Karl Brugman noted that it belonged to a cycle of stories wherein the hero works for a magician (or the devil) and finds a horse. The horse becomes his companion and helps him flee from the magician's clutches until they reach another kingdom, where the hero works in a menial position and the princess falls in love with him. This narrative is called by scholarship Goldenermärchen, after its main feature: the protagonist acquires golden hair early in the story.

Another name for the tale type ATU 314 is "The Man with Scurvy" (Le Teigneux, in French), because the hero hides his golden hair under a pig's bladder, which, according to Paul Delarue, gives him an appearance of a person with scurvy. Researcher Genevieve Massignon, on the other hand, stated that the hero hides his golden appearance under the pretense of having ringworm.

=== Motifs ===
According to Stith Thompson, "a standard part" of tale type ATU 314 is motif D672, "The Obstacle Flight", in the Motif-Index of Folk-Literature: the hero escapes on the horse and both delay the villain's pursuit by throwing objects behind them to create obstacles. Usually, they throw a stone (which becomes a mountain), a comb (which becomes a forest) and a flint (which produces a great fire).

Scholars Ibrahim Muhawi and Sharif Kanaana noted the core narrative sequence of the tale type involves the hero riding three horses to either save the kingdom, or to obtain a certain remedy. Either way, he gains his father-in-law's favour and is crowned king after him.

==== Alternate openings ====
Scholarship notes three different opening episodes to the tale type: (1) the hero becomes a magician's servant and is forbidden to open a certain door, but he does and dips his hair in a pool of gold; (2) the hero is persecuted by his stepmother, but his loyal horse warns him and later they both flee; (3) the hero is given to the magician as payment for the magician's help with his parents' infertility problem.

=== Related types ===
These three tale types (ATU 502, ATU 314 and AaTh 532), which refer to a male protagonist expelled from home, are said to be "widespread in Europe".

==== ATU 502: The Wild Man as a Helper ====
A less common variant, found only in Europe - according to Stith Thompson - opens with the hero rescuing a wild man, as in Iron John, Guerrino and the Savage Man, The Hairy Man, The Gold-bearded Man, The Iron Man, The King's Trophy, The Wild Man of the Marsh, The Tsarevich and the Dyad'ka, Story of Bulat the Brave Companion, One Good Turn Deserves Another, and The Wild Man - tales classified as ATU 502, "The Wild Man as a Helper". However, professor Jack Haney stated that the tale type is said to be common in Russian and Ukraine, but "disseminated" in Western Europe. The type can also be found in India, Indonesia and Turkey.

==== AaTh 532: "I Don't Know" ====
Another related set of stories was former tale type (Note: Stith Thompson doubted the independent existence of this type: "Confined, so far as now appears, to a very limited section of eastern Europe is the story of the hero called "I Don't Know." It is hard to tell whether this should be considered as a distinct tale type (Type 532), or merely as a variety of the Goldener story [Type 314]".) AT 532, "I Don't Know" or Neznaïko (fr) (a sapient horse instructs the hero to play dumb), a tale type that, according to Linda Dégh, is "particularly widespread" in the Central and Eastern regions of Europe. This type happens in Hungarian tale Nemtutka and Russian tale Story of Ivan, the Peasant's Son. (Note: Although folktale scholar Stith Thompson considered the former type AaTh 532 to be "very limited in Eastern Europe", Greek scholar Marianthi Kaplanoglou, on the other hand, states that the tale type AaTh 532, "I Don't Know" ("Bilmem", according to the national Greek Folktale Catalogue), is an "example" of "widely known stories (...) in the repertoires of Greek refugees from Asia Minor".)

==== Other tales ====
A similar tale is found in Thailand, as one of its most popular: Sangthong or Phra Sangthong ("Prince of the Golden Conch"). In this tale, prince Sangthong, born with a shell, is expelled from the kingdom with his mother and take refuge with an old couple. His mother breaks his shell. He departs and is taken in by a giantess. One day, he jumps into a golden well and his body acquires a gilded appearance. He disguises himself with "an ugly mask", calls himself Chao Ngo and goes to the Samon Kingdom. He marries the seventh daughter of King Samon, named Rodjana, who sees his through the disguise, but everyone else sees him as an ugly person. The king banishes his daughter after their marriage. At the end, prince Sangthong saves the Samon Kingdom.

== Variants ==
=== Distribution ===
This particular type of tale is well known, being particularly found in Germany, Scandinavia, and the Baltic, but also throughout Europe, and appears in Asia down to Indonesia and also in Africa.

Hasan El-Shamy indicated that the tale type is "widely spread" in North Africa.

=== Europe ===
==== Baltic region ====
===== Lithuania =====
Lithuanian folklorist Jonas Balys, in his analysis of Lithuanian folktales (published in 1936), listed 37 Lithuanian variants of type 314, Magiškas bėgimas arkliui padedant ("Magical Escape with the Help of a Horse"). In the updated Lithuanian Folktale Catalogue, by professor Bronislava Kerbelyte, the tale type is indexed as type 314, Arkliu paverstas jaunuolis ("Youth Transformed to a Horse"), totalling 62 variants and 58 combined with other tale types.

===== Latvia =====
According to the Latvian Folktale Catalogue, the tale type is also found in Latvia, indexed as 314, Zirgs palīdz puisim bēgt no velna ("Horse helps boy escape from Devil"): the hero is the Devil's servant, opens a forbidden room, finds a horse and dips his finger in gold; the boy and the horse escape from the Devil by throwing magical objects to hinder his pursuit; at another kingdom, the hero works in a menial position, such as a gardener or as a cook; later, he joins in battle with the aid of the horse.

===== Estonia =====
The Estonian Folktale Catalogue registers the forbidden door and the hero's escape as the first introduction of tale type ATU 314, Hobune abiliseks ("The Horse as a Helper"): the hero's father unknowingly promises his unborn son to a devil or ogre and the boy falls under his power when he is of age; the hero opens a forbidden door against his master's orders and finds a talking horse inside; the boy and the horse escape in a "Magical Flight" sequence by throwing objects behind them to deter their pursuer. The tale then continues as the boy finds work as gardener or cook to a king.

In a tale from the Lutsi Estonians collected by linguist Oskar Kallas the title Põgenenud kuningapoeg (German: Der entflohene Königssohn, English: "The Fugitive King's Son"), a king's son escapes home for some reason and ventures into the forest. There, he takes shelter in an old man's house, who gives him food and shelter. One day, the man has to leave and forbids the boy from opening a certain door while he is away. Despite his orders, the prince opens the room and finds a horse with some meat in front of him, instead of hay, so he exchanges the animal's fodder then exits the room. On another day, the man has to leave again, and the boy meets with the horse, which begins to talk: it bids the boy drinks a certain potion in order to tame the animal, and to fetch some objects for their escape. The prince and the horse escape from the old man's house and throw objects to deter him: a brush creates a forest, and a grinding stone a mountain. Failing that, the prince sways the right side of his cloak to create a bridge over a river of fire, and the left side to withdraw it, causing his pursuer to fall into the fire. At a safe distance, the prince feeds the horse a lot of hay, and finds work as the local king's gardener. The third princess visits the lowly gardener from time to time in his garden, filled with golden and silver apples, and falls in love with him. Later, three suitors come to woo the three princesses: the elder two accept their courtship, but the youngest gives an apple to the gardener, marking her choice and in effect spurning her third noble suitor. Enraged, the suitor returns home to his kingdom and brings an army to attack the kingdom. The lowly gardener joins in the battle on the horse as a mysterious knight and defeats the spurned suitor. For this first victory, the princess's father holds a feast in celebration, to which the princess brings the gardener in tow. The suitor, once again dejected, attacks the kingdom again and loses for the second time. The third time, the suitor meets an old man in a mountain, who gives him a horse that can rival the mysterious knight, but the gardener on his loyal horse defeats him for good. In retaliation, the old man injures the knight on the hand with an axe, and the king, his father-in-law, addresses his wound with a scarf. The gardener makes his retreat to his humble house, and passes out on his bed. His wife, the third princess, spots the wound on her husband's hand and realizes the gardener is the knight, so she alerts the king, her father. After twelve days, the gardener wakes up and is recognized by the king as an honourable man, who gives a feast in his homage. During the feast, the gardener's horse whinnies so loud it smashes the prince's glass. The animal then asks for the royal couple to wash its mouth and the prince's, and for them to be dried with a towel. The horse's request is carried out and he changes into a human person: the prince's long-lost brother.

==== Nordic region ====
===== Norway =====
According to The Types of the Norwegian Folktale, Norwegian folklorist Ørnulf Hodne registers 11 variants of the tale type in Norway, indexed as type AT 314, Gutten og trollhesten ("The Youth Transformed to a Horse"). In the tale type, a boy works for a devil or ogre, disobeys his employer and opens a certain door; he finds a magic horse, takes some magical objects and flees from him to another kingdom; he hides his golden hair under a wig, looking like a scald head, and works in the king's garden.

===== Finland =====
Tale type 314 is known in Finland as Pako pirun luota (Kultapää) ("Flight from Devil (Kultapää)"), according to the Finnish Folktale Catalogue, established by scholar Pirkko-Liisa Rausmaa. In the Finnish type, the hero escapes on a horse or bull by throwing magic objects behind him, then works as gardener to a human king.

In a Finnish tale titled Pechmütze ("Pitch-Cap"), a poor boy named Pechmütze goes to look for a job, but he meets on the road three one-eyed witches. The boy threatens each of the witches with death and gains from each one a metallic armour: copper from the first, silver from the second and golden from the third one. Later, he finds work as a cowherd for the local king, and herds the cows in a place named Devil's Meadow. One night, the Devil himself appears to Pitch-Cap and enters a contest with him: the Devil smashes a rock as a show of power, and Pitch-Cap, with guile, crushes a piece of cheese to trick the foolish Devil. After paying some coins to Pitch-Cap, the Devil takes the boy to his house as his new servant, where he is to look after the Devil's animal, a bear and a horse, feeding them, respectively, oats and coal, and to look after a cauldron of boiling blood and not open it. One day, after the Devil leaves for a while, Pitch-Cap disobeys his instructions: he look into the cauldron, and feeds coals to the bear and oats to the horse. Fearing for his life, the boy remembers his employer's threat, when the horse begins to talk and bids the boy fetch a whip, a bottle of water and a spruce branch, for they best escape. The horse takes the boy with him, and the Devil, after going home, is told of the boy's flight on the horse, and goes after him on the bear. En route, the horse advises the boy to throw behind them the whip, the branch (which creates a forest), and finally the water (which creates a vast river). The Devil and the bear try to drink up river and burst, while the boy returns to the king's service, although no one recognizes him, since much time has passed. The king's three daughters, the princesses, are already engaged to three suitors, who were each given a ring ornated with a precious stone. One day, Pitch-Cap wants to join the suitors in a hunt, but is given a lame rifle. However, Pitch-Cap does manage to shoot some birds, unlike the princesses' suitors, who wish to buy the birds, with one of them offering his engagement ring in exchange. Pitch-Cap makes a deal, then shoots a single sparrow just for show. The next day, Pitch-Cap kills the birds and agrees to sell them to the suitors, after he receives the second suitor's ring as payment. On the second day, he kills a deer for show. On the third day, he sells the birds he hunted for the third suitor's ring, and returns to the palace empty-handed. Some time later, war breaks out, and the princesses' suitors ride into battle. Meanwhile, Pitch-Cap goes back the horse companion he found at the Devil's house, joins the fray in the metallic armours he pilfered from the witches, and defeats the king's enemies. After each battle, Pitch-Cap goes back to the Devil's Meadow and unburies something, then goes to the king's court to present himself as the king's champion. The king and the court do not believe him, until he leaves and comes back in the same armours he wore in the battlefield, and shows the king his own wound which the king dressed with a scarf with the royal insignia. He also shows the king the suitors' rings as proof of the suitors' lies about the hunt. Enraged, the king orders the execution of the lying suitors, and gives one of the princesses to Pitch-Cap for wife.

==== Western Europe ====
===== Belgium =====
In a Belgian tale collected by Victor de Meyere from a Brabant source with the title De jongen met het gouden haar ("The Youth with the Golden Hair"), the son of a poor couple (the father a woodcutter and the mother a housewife) decides to leave home to look for work elsewhere, until he eventually reaches a castle and works as the castle lord's servant. The lord forbids the youth from opening a certain door. However, when his master leaves, the youth opens a first door and finds many silverware, and turns his index finger silver. The second time, the youth enters a room filled with golden objects, and his hair turns gold. The third time, he finds a talking horse that warns the boy the master of the castle will kill him, so they have to flee. The youth agrees and rides on the horse, then senses the lord after them. The horse bids the youth plucks a hair from its tail and cast behind them: the first hair creates a hedge of thorns; the second, a dense forest; and the third a vast sea, which the lord tries to cross and drowns. At a safe distance, the horse and the youth reach another a kingdom, where the boy finds work as a kitchen boy and leaves the horse in the market stables. The boy wears a fur cap on his golden head to hide his identity. Later, war breaks out; the golden-haired youth joins in the fray with the help of the horse, which furnishes him with a silver armour. In a second conflict, the boy defeats the king's enemies, then returns to his lowly position. One day, he wakes up before dawn to wash his hair in a pond at the palace, and the king's daughter sees him and falls in love with the boy. Later, the king arranges a feast and invitees a large assemblage of nobles and knights for the three princesses to choose husbands from by giving a golden apple to their husbands of choice. After the meal, the elder princesses choose their husbands, save for the youngest, who cannot see the kitchen boy among the gathered people. The king then orders him to be brought there, and the princess gives him her golden apple. The king thinks this an outrage, but the youngest princess bids her father order the boy to take off the fur cap. The kitchen boy does and shows the people his golden hair, the same golden hair as the knight in the battlefield had. The princess and the kitchen boy marry.

In a Flemish tale collected by Alfons de Cock and Pol de Mont with the title Van Schaapsvel ("About Sheep's Head"), a youth named Jan is very lazy, to his father's concern. Jan tries to find work, but gets many rejections to his face, until one day he enters the woods and knocks on the door of a house. An old woman greets him and he asks if she needs a servant. The old woman agrees to take him in and gives him orders to groom and feed three black horses and beat up a white one, and fobids him to open a certain door while she is way, lest she punishes him. After a while, Jan's curiosity gets the better of him and he opens the forbidden door. Inside, there is nothing there, save for a deep well he tries to peer into, but cannot see anything inside, so he locks the door and goes to feed the white horse. The horse begins to talk and tells Jan to look into the mirror. Jan is surprised at the horse's words, but obeys nonetheless: his hair has gained a golden colour. The horse then explains it is a princess turned into a horse by Jan's mistress, a sorceress, and bids him put on a sheepskin on his head to hide the golden hair, take a mirror, a comb and a hammer, so that they may escape. It happens thus, and the sorceress trails behind Jan and the white horse. The youth then throws the objects to hinder her pursuit: the mirror creates a vast sea, the hammer a mountain, and the comb a wall of fire. Jan and the horse safely flee from the sorceress, then explains the three black horses are also enchanted princes, and, should the boy need any help, he has but to think and she will appear to him. She also givs him a knife to kill the witch with and release the three princes, which he does. Some time later, Jan, or Sheep's Head, goes to Spain and finds work as the royal gardener's assistant. One day, the king of Spain's three daughters wish to have three beautiful bouquets, and Jan thinks about getting the white horse's help. Suddenly, the animal appears to him with a bouquet, which the gardener delivers. On the occasion of the third princess (Anna)'s birthday, Jan delivers her a beautiful bouquet furnished by the white horse, and the princess begins to fall in love with him. One day, she spies on him without his sheep's skin cap and spots his golden hair, then decides to marry him. Despite her father's wishes, she chooses the lowly gardener, and is given a decrepit castle as wedding gift. Later, war breaks out between Spain and Russia, and Jan is awaiing at home. He thinks about the white horse, and it appears with a regiment of soldiers to aid his father-in-law in battle. Jan appears to turn the tide of battle against the Russians; his cowardly brothers-in-law try to achieve any victory, but finds the enemy armies have retreated. Jan sends two of the soldiers of his regiment ahead of him to greet the king of Spain, and appears soon after. The king marvels at the mysterious knight, who reveals himself to be Jan. With the white horse's help, he changes back to his gardener disguise, then back to the knightly armour. The king embraces him as his son-in-law and holds a grand feast.

===== Ireland =====
In an Irish tale published by author Seumas MacManus with the title Hookedy-Crookedy, Jack, son of a king and a queen, decides to travel the world to earn his own fortune. On the road, he meets a gray-bearded old man who directs him to a giant named Giant of the Hundred Hills, who has been looking for a servant. Jack meets the Giant, who takes him in and instructs the prince to look after the place, for the Giant leaves every day to battle another giant at the end of the world. The Giant also warns Jack not to open the door to the stables. The next day, the Giant leaves Jack alone at home, and opens every door, save for the stables. He decides to check what is inside it, and spins a ring on the pivot: inside, he finds a mare and a bear with the incorrect fodder (meat for the mare, hay for the bear). Jack inverts the fodder's positions, then exits the stables, but sticks his finger in the ring. Afraid of the Giant's fury, Jack cuts off his own finger. The Giant comes home and spots Jack's injured hands, but forgives the trespass for their family's history, and leaves it be. The next day, Jack disobeys the Giant again, feeds the animals with the correct fodder, and sticks another finger in the ring, having to cut it off. The Giant comes home and chastises Jack for this. On the third day, Jack goes to feed the mare and the bear, when the mare begins talk, warning the prince the Giant will surely kill him, and he must escape. The bear joins them in their flight. As the Giant chases after them, the mare asks Jack to fetch something from its ears to hinder the pursuit: a chestnut from the left ear (which creates a chestnut wood) and a drop of water from the right ear (which creates a lough). After fleeing from the Giant, they take refuge in a forest near the Scotland border; the mare gives Jack a wishing-cap and, breathing over the boy, changes him to a hookedy-crooked shape. Jack, under the new disguise, goes to the castle of the King of Scotland in order to find a job, but a female servant that was scouring knives informed that the King employed no man. After the maidservant leaves to report to the king, Jack uses the wishing-cap and the cutlery is done by the time the servant comes back with the king. The monarch is convinced to hire Jack for his ugliness, and places him on the garden. Some time later, war breaks out with the King of the East; the King of Scotland is advised by his Grand Adviser to send for nobles to marry his daughters, so he can find allies. Thus, the eldest princess is married to the son of the King of Spain and the middle one to the son of the King of France. As for the youngest, named Yellow Rose, she refuses any suitors, to her father's concern, and goes to the garden to console herself in the gardener's presence. Hookedy-Crookedy and Yellow Rose eventually fall in love with each other. Later, per the Grand Adviser's words, the King will send his new sons-in-law to the Well at the World's End to fill bottles of loca for the upcoming battle. Hookedy-Crookedy is told of this by the youngest princess and consults with the mare. The animal advises him on how to proceed: Jack is to join the princes in their quest on a lame horse; when the trio go their separate ways at the crossroads, Jack is to summon two bottles of loca with the wishing-cap, then convene with the others. It happens as the mare predicts: Jack, whom the brothers-in-law do not recognize, meets the princes en route and offers them the bottles of loca in exchange for their golden balls (which the elder princesses gave them as token of betrothal) and to allow Jack to write something on their backs. The princes agree to a deal, and bring back the loca to the king. The next day, the king of Scotland, the princes and the army go to war; Jack goes to meet the mare, which provides him with a gallant armour, and he goes to battle with the mare and the bear. Three times Jack defeats the enemies on the King of Scotland's behalf, and is given a reward by the king after each battle (a magical tablecloth that provides food in the first, an inexhaustible purse that provides money in the second, and a magical comb in the third). The king also invites the knight to a meal for three days, which Jack attends in the gallant armours he wore to battle. During the three days, Jack, posing as the knight, tries to woo Yellow Rose and belittles the crooked gardener, but Yellow Rose will have none of that. Still, Jack gives her the magical objects the king gave him, and, on the third day, unmasks the princes' treachery by revealing the inscriptions on their backs. Lastly, Yellow Rose goes to meet with Hookedy-Crookedy, and uses the comb on him, turning him into Jack. The princess and Jack marry. At the end of the tale, a woman appears to Jack and the princess and says she was the mare, and the bear her brother, now finally released from their enchantment.

==== Central Europe ====
===== Hungary =====
The Hungarian Folktale Catalogue (MNK) registers type ATU 314 in Hungary with the title Az aranyhajú kertészbojtár ("The Golden-Haired Gardener"): the hero works for the Devil (either promised by his parents or hired as his servant); he opens a forbidden room and his hair becomes gold; he is ordered by the devil not to feed a horse (described as a táltos horse) in the devil's stables, but does so and escapes on the horse to another kingdom, throwing objects behind him to create obstacles to hinder the Devil's pursuit; at another kingdom, he puts on a disguise on his golden hair and finds work as the king's gardener; the youngest princess marries him and they move out to a pigsty; he proves his worth to his father-in-law by doing heroic deeds (e.g., achieving victories in war; defeating a dragon; finding a cure for the king).

===== Poland =====
According to philologist and folklorist Julian Krzyżanowski, establisher of the Polish Folktale Catalogue according to the international index, the tale type ATU 314 is also reported in Poland, index as 314, Zaczarowany koń ("Enchanted Horse"). In the Polish type, the hero works for the Devil (either hired by him or sold by his parents), and opens a forbidden room; his hair turns gold and he finds a talking horse that bids him escape from his employer; the horse and the hero throw behind objects to deter the Devil and they reach another kingdom; once there, the hero hides his golden hair under a scarf, and works as a cook or a gardener; the princess falls in love with the lowly servant, marries him and is banished from the palace to a pigsty; the hero takes off the disguise and practice heroic deeds (fighting in a war; finding a remedy for the king, etc.); lastly, the lowly servant is recognized as the brave knight.

==== Southern Europe ====
===== Albania =====
Slavicist André Mazon, in his study on Balkan folklore, collected an Albanian language tale he translated as Le Chauve ("The Bald One"). In this tale, God grants a couple a son. A strange merchant comes and takes the boy as his apprentice, but he abandons the boy in the mountains to die. The boy, however, is saved by three fairies that live in the mountain; they feed and raise the boy until he is old enough. They give him a set of keys and forbid him to open a certain door while they are away, but he does exactly that after they depart; he finds a winged horse inside. The boy rides the horse away from the fairies and manages to escape from the three of them. Despite his escape, the elder fairy advises him to take on a shabby disguise and pluck three hairs from the horse to summon it. The boy then finds work as a king's gardener in a distant city. One day, he summons the horse to trample the garden, and the youngest princes witnesses him. Some time later, the king's three daughters are to choose their husbands by tossing golden apples to suitors while they pass by the window. The elder two choose princes, while the youngest chooses the gardener. For this perceived affront, the king banishes the youngest to the goose barn. Later, the king becomes blind, and only the "voda-živa" ("water of life") can cure him. The gardener rides on a lame horse to begin his quest; but ditches his mount and summons the winged horse. He finds the water of life and brings it to the king, then reveals he was the baldheaded gardener.

===== Portugal =====
According to the Portuguese Folktale Catalogue by scholars Isabel Cárdigos and Paulo Jorge Correia, tale type 314 is reported in Portugal with the title O Jardineiro do Rei ("The King's Gardener"). In the Portuguese tale type, the hero goes to work with the devil or a magic being, opens the door to a forbidden room and discovers the talking horse; he rides the horse away from the devil in Magic Flight sequence (throwing objects behind him to create magic obstacles), then goes to another kingdom where he finds work as gardener to a king, and wears a disguise.

==== Caucasus Region ====
In a tale from the Karachay-Balkar language translated to Russian as "Быжмапапах" ("Byzhmapapakh"), a shepherd sees children running about and sighs that he has no children. Suddenly, a diminute man (of one karysh) with a large beard (of a thousand karysh) appears, thinking he was summoned by the man. At any rate, the diminute man gives the shepherd an apple to be given to the man's wife, with one condition: after his son is born, they have to let him leave home and not return until he is married. The shepherd obeys the diminute man's instructions, and a golden-haired son is born to them. Years later, when the boy comes of age, the shepherd follows the diminute man's orders and convinces his son to depart. The boy is given provisions for the road and begins his journey. His path leads him to an abandoned barn where three horses are kept. The horses can talk and convince the boy to keep them, and tell him to pluck a hair from their tails; he can light the hairs to summon the horses if he needs any help. Finally, he reaches a group of shepherds and dines with them. The shepherds talk about their khan, and, moved by their words, the boy decides to find work as a servant to the khan. The khan agrees and takes him in; the other servants mockingly call him Byzhmapapakh. The khan's youngest daughter sees Byzhmapapakh and falls in love with him. Some time later, the three princesses decide they want to get married and, on the matchmaker's advice, bring three watermelons to their father as analogy to their marriageability. The khan cuts open the watermelons (one rotten, the second overripe, the third ripe enough), and summons sons of khans for his daughters to choose. The elder princesses give their pryanik (in the Russian translation; a type of gingerbread cake) to their chosen ones, while the youngest gives theirs to Byzhmapapakh, to her sisters' jeer and her father's irritation. The khan marries his elder daughters in grand ceremonies, and banishes the youngest to a chicken coop. Later, the khan falls ill, and can only be cured by eating lioncub's meat and drinking lioness's milk. The khan's sons-in-law go to hunt for some lions; Byzhmapapakh joins the hunt on a lame horse, but, out of sight, summons one of the horses, gallops away to the steppes and finds a lioness. The lioness begs to be spared; Byzhmapapakh agrees to spare it, in return for its lioncub and the milk. On the road back, he meets his brothers-in-law, who do not recognize him, and spins a story about needing the meat for his mother. The brothers-in-law ask for some; Byzhmapapakh agrees, in exchange for him branding their shoulders. The next day, the khan asks for some deer meat. The sons-in-law march again to the hunt, but Byzhmapapakh finds the deer meat first, and agrees to share it with them as long as they agree to be branded on their flanks. At the end of the tale, the khan holds a grand feast and invites his two sons-in-law. Byzhmapapakh appears unannounced and gifts his father-in-law one of the horses. The khan rides the animals for a bit, impressed by its prowess, and asks the stranger about his identity. Byzhmapapakh tells him everything, including the marks on the brothers-in-law.

=== America ===
Native American variants of this type were assumed by Stith Thompson to have originated from French-Canadian sources.

Gerald E. Aucoin reported 82 variants of type ATU 314 in Canada. A later study by researchers Carolle Richard and Yves Boisvert registered 101 recorded variants in the Laval University archives: 59 from Québec, 30 from Acadia, 5 from Ontario and 7 from the United States.

Franz Boas collected a tale from a Zuni source with the title The Sold Child. In this tale, a poor Mexican man from Palos Altos goes to the forest to cut wood, and a catfish emerges from the river and asks the man to give it the first thing that meets him. The man goes home and his own son greets him, which forces him to surrender his son to the fish. The boy lives with the catfish, who raises the boy, until one day the boy, all grown up, follows an Antelope-Girl to a house where he finds a girl. The girl asks him to marry her, but first he has to ask for his parents' blessing. The boy asks the catfish for his birth parents, and is told of a store owner and his wife in Los Lunas. The boy rides a horse and pays a visit to the couple. After explaining the whole story and talking about the girl at the house, the couple give their son a candle and matches so he can better see his intended bride at night. The boy rides back to the hut and lights a candle on his bride while she is asleep, but lets a drop of wax fall on her. With that, the girl's house changes back to an antelope's burrow, and he is all alone in the world. He wanders off the plains and climbs up a tree to flee from a coyote pack, when he sees a light in the distance. He climbs down the tree and goes to the fire, where a person named Distella Glande (estrella grande, 'great star') is. The great star takes the boy in as his servant and orders him to kill a steer every day and fill a trough with water, but forbids him from entering a nearby shed. One day, he fulfills his tasks and gets curious about what lies in the shed. He opens it and finds a bay horse readily saddled. The horse talks to him that Distella Glande is planning to devour the boy, and that they must make their escape. The boy closes the shed and steps into a lead well, injuring his foot. The great star comes back and asks the boy what happened to his foot, and he lies that the great star's knife and axe hurt him. The next morning, the boy releases the horse, takes its comb and brush, a steer's stomach and the lead well with him, and rides away. The great star discovers the boy fled on the horse and chases after him. Sensing his approach, the horse tells the boy to throw behind them the comb (with creates a large lake), the brush (which becomes a thick timber), and the steer's stomach (which becomes rocks and canyons). As a last effort, the horse asks to be fed the lead, and shoots bullets at the great star, killing him. The horse instructs the boy to take the great star's organs and throw at different cardinal points: his head becomes the morning star, the heart the evening star, and his instestines the seven stars. The boy rides a bit more and finds a Black man near the river. The horse suggests they kill the man and skin him. The animal kicks the Black man in the head and kills him, the boy takes his skin and wears it, then ties a rock to the body and throws it in the river. The boy, in the Black man's disguise, reaches a city and the horse advises him to ask the king for a job in the royal gardens pruning the trees. It happens so. During his stay at the castle, the king orders his four daughters, the princesses, to take some food for the gardener, but they all fear him save the youngest, Angelina. One day, the youngest princess takes a tray of food to him and spies on him washing the Black man's skin in a ditch. The boy wears the skin again over his white skin and goes to talk to the princess. Later, the horse advises the boy to go to the king for one of his daughters in marriage, and, if the king refuses, he should let the princesses choose for themselves. The boy, in the Black skin's disguise, follows the animal's advice; the monarch summons his four daughters: the elder three deny marrying the gardener, but Angelina chooses him and moves out to his orchard. Later, war breaks out with the Navaho, and the king sends his gardener son-in-law to join in the fight. The boy takes off his disguise, rides the horse to kill the enemy Navahos and take their scalps as prizes, then goes back to the orchard to hang the scalps. After three confrontations, the horse decides to end their charade, since the lead supply they brought from the great star is shortening. After a final combat where they kill the Navaho, the boy and the horse present themselves to the king, his father-in-law, who welcomes him as his successor.

=== Asia ===
==== West Asia ====
In a Yemeni tale collected by author Werner Daum and translated into German as Eselsfell ("[The One With A] Donkeyskin"), a sultan's son is victim of a ploy by his stepmother, who tries to seduce him, and is expelled from home with his horse. He stops to rest in the desert for the night, when the daughter of the King of the Djinns appears to him intent on helping him as his adoptive sister. She gives him a long strand of her hair to summon her help, and vanishes. The youth rides some more into a wadi and sees a dead donkey. He skins the donkey and makes a garment out of its hide. He then reaches a kingdom, ruled by a Sultan with seven daughters. Because of his strange vestments, the youth is mockingly called "Donkeyskin". One day, at the cistern, the boy waits for everyone to leave, before he takes off the donkey hide and bathes in the water. The sultan's seventh daughter sees him and falls in love with him. At the ceremony of selecting a husband, each of the princesses throws an apple to their suitors, the youngest and seventh princess throws her to Donkeyskin. Her father questions her choice, but she remains steadfast, so he marries her off to the lowly boy and banishes her from the palace to the stables. When a neighbouring Sultan threatens the kingdom, the Sultan's six sons-in-law rush to defend it, but Donkeyskin departs first, summons the Daughter of the King of the Djinns and asks her for a strong horse. He defeats the enemies, and goes back to his lowly disguise.

German linguist and Semitologist Gotthelf Bergsträsser published a Syrian tale from Ma'lula. In this tale, a widowed man remarries, but his new wife hates her step-son. The boy decides to run away from home, so he steals his father's magic wishing ring and leaves. On the journey, he trades clothes with a beggar and steals an animals intestines from a woman. He reaches another kingdom and finds work as a farmhand in a man's garden, and tells his name is Grindkopf. Later, when his employer is asleep, he uses the ring to summon a horse, an armor and a fez, and rides around the garden in secret. One day, his riding is spied on by the vizier's daughter, who falls in love with him. Later, she decides to look for a suitor, but fancies none of the men in the city, so it is suggested that every bachelor passes by her window and she will throw an apple to the one she chooses. The suggestion is carried out: every man in the city passes by the vizier's daughter's window, but she throws her apple to Grindkopf. Thinking his daughter made a wrong choice, the vizier summons everyone the next day, and still she chooses the Grindkopf. Enraged at her decision, the vizier agrees to marry his daughter to the lowly boy, but expels her from home to a lame cabin near the garden. Some time later, war breaks out, and the Grindkopf mounts a lame horse and joins the army, under sniding remarks. At a distance from the city, he doffs the shabby disguise, summons the horse with the ring and rides into battle. He vanquishes the enemies, but is hurt in the hand, which the vizier bandages. He returns home and resumes the Grindkopf identity. Back from the war, the vizier is advised to banish his son-in-law in order to avoid further humiliation, and pays a visit to his daughter. Inside the house, Grindkopf lies on the bed, and the vizier notices the bandaged hand. He realizes his son-in-law was the knight at the battlefield, and his daughter confirms his conclusions.

In an Iraqi tale collected by E. S. Drower with the title The Blind Sultan, a sultan has two wives, an Arab woman, and an Abyssinian one, two sons by his first wife and one son by the second. After the elder brother marries an emir's daughter and the middle son a wizier's daughter, the younger brother leaves home and wanders around the world. On his journey, he helps a lion by dislodging a thorn from its paw and he is given three hairs from its mane. The prince rubs the three hairs; three slaves appear before him. The youth asks for a flying mare and fine garments, then rides the mare to a city. He buys a sheep from a shepherd, kills it and makes a cap out of its paunch, then finds work as a gardener's apprentice near the Sultan's palace. The sultan's youngest daughter sees the boy and falls in love with him. Later, at the princesses' behest, the gardener brings three melons to their father, the Sultan, in order to assess their marriageability. The king decides it is past time he married his daughter and sets a suitor selection test: the princesses are to throw apples at their men of choice when they parade beneath their window. The two elder princesses choose, respectively, an emir's son and a wazir's son. When it is her turn, she sees that the gardener's apprentice is not at the gathering of suitors, and asks her father to bring him in. She throws her apple to the boy, much to her father's disgust, who marries them and exiles her younger daughter to the stables. Later, war breaks out with a neighbouring king, and the prince summons the flying mare to ride into battle and defeat his father-in-law's enemies. During the fight, his hand is injured, and the Sultan bandages him with a piece of a shawl. Their victory assured, the prince goes back to the gardener and to his lowly disguise. The Sultan returns to Baghdad and inquires if anyone has seen the fine and mysterious warrior, but none can give any answer. Distraught with grief over not finding the warrior, the Sultan falls ill and becomes blind, and the royal doctors prescribe lioness's milk served inside a lion's skin. The Sultan's two sons-in-law begin the quest, but lose all their money in a bet and are forced to work for a living. Finally, the prince rides through the same road, but meets an old man. By showing him kindness, the old man advises the prince on how to get the lioness's milk from a castle. His mission accomplished, the prince goes to the city where his brothers-in-law are and buys their freedom, having them accompany him. Before they return to Baghdad, the prince summons the three slaves and asks for a tent, where he welcomes his brothers-in-law and gives them a bag of lioness's milk diluted in water, in exchange for him branding their backs. Lastly, after the two sons-in-law give the Sultan the diluted milk, the prince gives the correct one and heals his father-in-law.

In a Kurdish tale from Adiyaman Province with the title Gurrî Û Hûtê Kor ("Gurrî and Blind Dev"), a bald youth named Gurrî flees from his aunt and uncle's home and finds a herd of sheep he grazes to a cave, where a blind hut ('giant') lives. Gurrî tricks the hut into thinking he is his son, and continues to graze the sheep. One day, he disobeys the giant's orders and guides the sheep to an eastwards direction, where a witch warns him against the giant. He later guides the flock to another direction, meets another man and steals his flock. Some time later, the giant tells Gurrî not to open the doors while he is away and departs. While the giant is away, the boy opens every door in the cave, releasing the giant's prisoners, and finds a talking horse that bids the boy fetch some objects (a corncob, a knife and a bar of soap) and escape with it. Gurrî and the horse ride away from the cave, and are pursued by the giant. The boy throws the objects behind him to deter the giant: corncob becomes a cornfield, the knife a field of blades and finally the soap creates a large river where the giant drowns. Both reach another kingdom, where the horse gives Gurrî some of its hairs, then departs. Gurrî goes to a nearby house and finds work with an old couple. While working his new job, Gurrî summons the horse and tramples the old couple's crops - events seen by the local sultan's third and youngest daughter. Later, the sultan summons an assemblage of eligible suitors for his daughter to choose from, and she throws an apple to Gurrî, representing her choice. The sultan agrees to their marriage, but banishes his daughter to a chicken coop. Later, he falls ill, and only lioness's milk brought in a lion cub's hide can cure him. Gurrî summons his horse again and rides into the wilderness; he helps a lioness and the animal agrees to cede some of its milk to the boy. Soon enough, Gurrî's brothers-in-law come and ask him (who they do not recognize) for some, so he gives them she-goat's milk. The sultan drinks the milk his two sons-in-law brought, but cannot recover; only the milk Gurrî brought restores his health. Gurrî unmasks his brothers-in-law's deception and builds a palace for himself and his wife.

==== Philippines ====
Folklorist Dean Fansler stated that a similar tale named Juan Tiñoso is "one of the most widely-known stories in the Islands". One popular version was a Pampangan metrical romance titled Story of the Life of King Don Octavio and Queen Teodora, together with that of their son Don Fernando, in the Kingdom of Spain, Don Octavio or Pugut Negru. In this story, the queen of Spain is barren, and only the pau-fruit can cure her infertility, but a giant holds the fruit in his orchard. The king of Spain looks the fruit and meets the giant, who agrees to let the king have the fruit in exchange for him being the prince's godfather. After the boy is born, the giant comes and takes the child with him and gives to an old woman to raise the baby. Years later, when the boy has grown up to a youth, the old woman warns that the giant is a cannibal, and urges him to escape with a horse. He mounts a horse and takes the old woman with him, and flees from the giant. At a distance, the old woman gives the youth a whip and vanishes, for she was the Virgin Mary. The youth, Prince Fernando, wanders with the whip, finds a Black man's corpse and flays his skin to wear it, under the guise of "Pugut-Negru" ("disguised Negro"), and finds work as a shepherd to the king of Albania. He has further adventures: first, he cures the blind king of Albania with some herbs and marries his youngest daughter; then quests for a cure for the queen - lion's milk, which he gives to his future brothers-in-law in exchange for branding their backs with his name; and finally joins in the war as a mysterious knight to protect the kingdom, is injured and his wife, the third and youngest princess of Albania, bandages his injury without knowing of his true identity. At last, the princess enters Pugut-Negru's hut and finds her husband there, realizing the shepherd and the knight at the war are one and the same.

== Literary comparisons ==
Scholarship has noted similarities of tale types ATU 314 and ATU 502 with the medieval legend of Robert the Devil and its English reworking, Sir Gowther. Years after his birth, Robert/Gowther discovers his unholy parentage and exiles himself in penance in another kingdom. In this kingdom, the king's daughter, who is dumb, is demanded by a sultan. When the king refuses, the sultan prepares to go to war. Robert/Gowther, who has worked in a menial position in the castle, obtains three horses (black, red and white) to defend the kingdom. Likewise, researcher Elisabeth Gaucher also associated the story to tale type 314, known in French academia as Le Teigneux or Le Petit Jardinier aux Cheveux d'Or ("The Golden-Haired Little Gardener").

As such, according to Yolando Pino Saavedra, French folklorist Paul Delarue was inclined to declare that the tale type circulated during the Middle Ages, an idea also proposed by Germanist Ernst Tegethoff, who assumed the tale "was already Frankish property". In addition, scholar Jack Zipes even declared that "almost all folklorists agree" that the Goldener narrative developed during the European Middle Ages.

== See also ==
- Fire Boy (folktale)
- The Turtle Prince (folktale)
- The Boy with the Moon on his Forehead
- Kaloghlan (Turkish folk hero)
- Prince Ring
