= Georgic and Merlin =

Georgic and Merlin is a French fairy tale collected by François Cadic in "La Paroisse bretonne".

It is Aarne-Thompson type 502. The oldest known tale of this type is Guerrino and the Savage Man. Another variant is Iron John.

== Synopsis ==
In the woods near a rich lord's castle, a mysterious bird sang. Fascinated, the lord had it captured. It ceased to sing, but he threatened to kill anyone who freed it. One day, it pleaded with the lord's son Georgic, who freed it; it told him to call on it, Merlin, if in need and then flew off. Georgic's mother feared that her husband would kill Georgic. A salt-vendor offered to take him away, and his mother gave him money to do it. He took the money and at the next castle, offered the boy as a shepherd, despite the warnings of wolves that threatened. When the salt-vendor went to leave him, Georgic demanded the money and when it was refused, he called on the bird; it appeared, and a club wielded by an invisible hand struck the man until he gave the money. Then he called on the bird to give him a whistle to summon the wolves and muzzles to keep them from biting, and so he kept the sheep safe.

In the same region, there was a dragon with seven heads that had to receive a maiden every year. That year, the lot fell to Georgic's master's daughter, who wept for fear. When she was sent, Georgic asked the bird for a horse, a sword, and a black cloak; he took her on his horse and carried her to the place, where he called for the dragon. It declared it was not hungry that day, she was to come back the next, and left. Georgic carried her back; she had been too upset to recognize him, but she had cut a piece from his cloak. She went back the next day, and this time Georgic wore a gray cloak, but the events went as before. The third day, Georgic wore a purple cloak, and he stopped and borrowed a long iron fork that a man was using on the stove. He used it to drag the dragon from its lair and cut off its heads with his sword. He cut out the tongues, and the daughter cut off a piece of this cloak as well.

A coal miner claimed to have killed the dragon. The daughter said the dragon slayer had cut out the tongues, and the coal miner claimed to have eaten them. The lord held a great feast, and the daughter saw Georgic in his black cloak, which had exactly the hole in it that she had cut. Georgic vanished. The lord had a second banquet, at which Georgic wore the gray cloak, with the hole just as she had cut it; the lord asked him whether he was the one who had rescued his daughter, and he said he might be. At the third banquet, Georgic arrived in a grand manner. The daughter recognized him by the hole, and they married.

Soon after, her father fell ill. A wizard said that he could be cured with a piece of orange from the orange tree of the Armenian Sea, water from the Fountain of Life, and some bread and wine from the Yellow Queen. Georgic had two brothers-in-law who were jealous of him; they set out and became lost. Georgic also set out. In the woods, he met a hermit, who gave him a magic wand to lead him. It would take him to the orange tree, where he should cut the orange into four parts, one of which he should take away. Then he would reach the Fountain of Life, but he should go to the Yellow Queen's castle first, taking some wine and bread, and a lance, calling out it was for his father-in-law's health. He would then find a stag which he should ride to the Fountain; if the lion that guarded it woke, he should use the lance to kill it. He retrieved the things in this way.

He met his brothers-in-law along the way, and traded some of what he had won for the ear and wedding ring of one, and the toe of the other. The hermit had warned him that he would have to give what he had taken back to the Yellow Queen after a month. He did not warn them, and when the Yellow Queen came, he was gone, and his brothers-in-law were beaten for having it. They had to run to him and beg his help, which he gave.

== Commentary ==
Many French variants of this tale feature a wild man instead of a bird, but in Brittany, it is very common that this figure, whether a bird or a man, is called Merlin. It is not clear what connection this figure has to the Merlin of Arthurian legends, either with the legends as a source from the folklore, or the folklore as a source for the legend.

== See also ==
- The Thirteenth Son of the King of Erin
- The Bold Knight, the Apples of Youth, and the Water of Life
