= Iron John =

German fairy tale

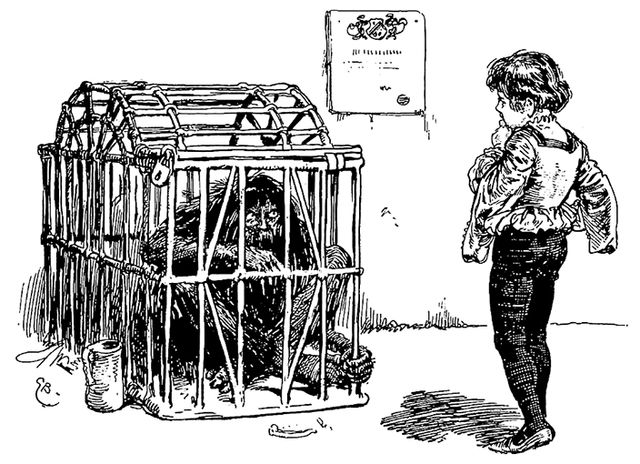
- Eisenhans in the cage approached by a young prince

Folk tale
- Name: Iron John
- Aarne–Thompson grouping: ATU 502, "The Wild Man as a Helper"
- Country: Germany
- Published in: Grimms' Fairy Tales
- Related: Georgic and Merlin

"Iron John" (also "Iron Hans"; German: Der Eisenhans) is a German fairy tale found in the collections of the Brothers Grimm, tale number 136, about an iron-skinned wild man and a prince. The original German title is Eisenhans, a compound of Eisen "iron" and Hans (like English John, a common short form of the personal name Johannes). It represents Aarne–Thompson type 502, "The wild man as a helper".

Most people see the story as a parable about a boy maturing into adulthood. The story also became the basis for the book Iron John: A Book About Men by Robert Bly which spawned the mythopoetic men's movement in the early 1990s. The book spent 62 weeks on The New York Times Best Seller list.

== Origin ==
According to the Brothers Grimm, the source of Eisern Hans, in their compilation, was tale nr. 17 from Friedmund von Arnim's book.

== Synopsis ==
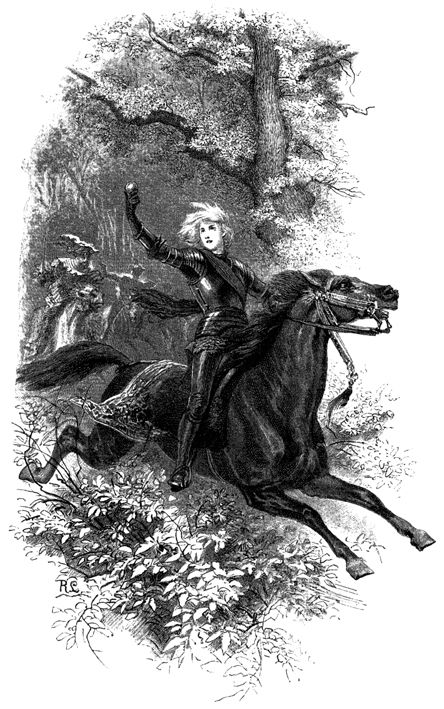
The prince as a mysterious knight.

Once upon a time, there was a kingdom that was near a great forest that was filled with all types of wild animals. The King sends a huntsman into the forest nearby to hunt a deer and the huntsman never returns. The King sends more men into the forest where they each meet with the same fate. The King sends all his remaining huntsmen out as a group, but again, none return. The king proclaims the woods as dangerous and off-limits to all.

Some years later, a wandering explorer accompanied by a dog hears of these dangerous woods and asks permission to hunt in the forest, claiming that he might be able to discover the fate of the other hunters. The man and his dog are allowed to enter. As they come to a lake in the middle of the forest, the dog is dragged under water by a giant bare arm. The hunter returns to the forest the next day with a group of men to empty the lake. They find lying down at the bottom of the lake a large and naked wild man with rusted iron-like skin (some versions show him in some article of clothing) and sporting a shaggy beard and hair that are long enough to go down to his knees. They capture him and he is locked in a cage in the courtyard as a curiosity. The king declares that no one is allowed to set the wild man free or they will face the penalty of death.

Years later, the 8-year-old prince is playing with a ball in the courtyard. He accidentally rolls it into the cage where the iron-skinned man picks it up and will only return it if he is set free. He states further that the only key to the cage is hidden beneath the queen's pillow.

Though the prince hesitates, he eventually builds up the courage to sneak into his mother's room and steal the key. He releases the wild iron-skinned man who reveals his name to be Iron John (or Iron Hans depending on the translation). The prince fears he will be killed for setting Iron John free, so Iron John agrees to take the prince with him into the forest.

Iron John is a powerful being and has many treasures that he guards. He sets the prince to watch over his well, but warns him not to let anything touch it or fall in because it will turn instantly to gold. The prince obeys at first, but begins to play in the well eventually turning all his hair into gold. Disappointed in the boy's failure, Iron John sends him away to experience poverty and struggle. Iron John also tells the prince that if he ever needs anything, simply to call the name of Iron John three times.

The prince travels to a distant land and offers his services to its king. Since he is ashamed of his golden hair, he refuses to remove his cap before its king and is sent to assist the gardener.

When war comes to the kingdom, the prince sees his chance to make a name for himself. He calls upon Iron John, who gives him a horse, armor, and a legion of iron warriors to fight alongside him. The prince successfully defends his new homeland, but returns all that he borrowed to Iron John before returning to his former position.

In celebration, the king announces a banquet and offers his daughter's hand in marriage to any one of the knights who can catch a golden apple that will be thrown into their midst. The king hopes that the mysterious knight who saved the kingdom will show himself for such a prize. Again the prince asks Iron John for help, and again Iron John disguises the prince as the mysterious knight. Though the prince catches the golden apple and escapes, and does so again on two more occasions, he is eventually found out.

After telling his tale to the court, the prince is returned to his former station, marries the princess, and is happily reunited with his parents. Iron John too comes to the wedding. This time, he is seen without his wild man appearance that made him frightening, as his true form is a stately king. Iron John reveals to the prince he was under an enchantment until he found someone worthy and pure of heart to set him free, and in his gratitude he bequeaths all his treasures to the prince.

== Analysis ==
=== Tale type ===
The tale is classified in the international Aarne-Thompson-Uther Index as type ATU 502, "The Wild Man as Helper".

The oldest variant to be preserved is the Italian Guerrino and the Savage Man. In chivalric romance the motif appears in recognizable if rationalized form in Roswall and Lillian. This in turn influenced the ballad The Lord of Lorn and the False Steward, too closely related not to be derived.

=== Related tales ===
A more widespread variant, found in Europe, Asia, and Africa, opens with the prince for some reason being the servant of an evil being, where he gains the same gifts, and the tale proceeds as in this variant; one such tale is The Magician's Horse. These tales are classified in the Aarne-Thompson-Uther Index as ATU 314, "The Goldener": a youth with golden hair works as the king's gardener. In this regard, Germanist Günter Dammann, in Enzyklopädie des Märchens, suggested that tale type ATU 502 should be treated as an introductory episode, since both types (ATU 502 and ATU 314) "largely" have the same narrative sequence. Also, he noted that the type was marked by the release of the wild man prisoner by the hero. Similarly, German scholar Hans-Jörg Uther noted that type ATU 502 is "often" the first part to ATU 314, "Goldener".

Another closely related tale is the former tale type (Note: Stith Thompson doubted the independent existence of this type: "Confined, so far as now appears, to a very limited section of eastern Europe is the story of the hero called "I Don't Know." It is hard to tell whether this should be considered as a distinct tale type (Type 532), or merely as a variety of the Goldener story [Type 314]". Thompson, Stith (1977). The Folktale. University of California Press. p. 61. ISBN 0-520-03537-2) AT 532, "I Don't Know" or Neznaiko (a sapient horse instructs the hero to play dumb). The former type happens in Hungarian tale Nemtutka and Russian tale Story of Ivan, the Peasant's Son. (Note: Although folktale scholar Stith Thompson considered the former type AaTh 532 to be "very limited in Eastern Europe", Greek scholar Marianthi Kaplanoglou, on the other hand, states that the tale type AaTh 532, "I Don't Know" ("Bilmem", according to the national Greek Folktale Catalogue), is an "example" of "widely known stories (...) in the repertoires of Greek refugees from Asia Minor".)

These three tale types (ATU 502, ATU 314 and AaTh 532), which refer to a male protagonist expelled from home, are said to be "widespread in Europe".

== Variants ==
Tale type ATU 502 is known throughout Europe, in such variants as The Hairy Man. The tale type is said to be common in Russian and Ukraine, but "disseminated" in Western Europe. The type can also be found in India, Indonesia and Turkey.

=== Slavic ===
According to Germanist Günter Dammann, in Enzyklopädie des Märchens, the wild man, in Slavic and Eastern European variants, is described as having iron, copper or gold skin.

The tale type is also reported in the East Slavic Folktale Classification (Russian: СУС, romanized: SUS) as type SUS 502, Russian: "Медный лоб", romanized: Mednyy lob, lit. 'Copper Head (fr)': the prince releases a supernatural prisoner his father captured, and is expelled from home; he reaches another kingdom and, through heroics, gets to marry a princess. In addition, according to Jack V. Haney, the story is "known" in Russia since 1786, via printed books, and the supernatural captive is either a bogatyr or a forest spirit.

=== Germanic ===
==== Germany ====
According to Jack Zipes, another literary predecessor to the Grimm's tale in German tradition is Christian August Vulpius's Der eiserne Mann, oder: Der Lohn der Gehorsams ("The Iron Man, or, The Reward of Obedience"). Germanist Emil Sommer collected another German variant, from Gutenberg, titled Der eiserne Mann ("The Iron Man").

Folklorist Franz Xaver von Schönwerth collected in the 19th century a Bavarian variant titled König Goldhaar ("King Goldenlocks"). In this tale, a king has a golden-haired son. One day, the king captures a wild man who is made of iron and brings it home in a cage. The young prince accidentally tosses his ball inside the cage, which the wild man promises to return if the boy releases him. The prince fulfills his promise, to the king's anger, who orders his son execution. However, the king's servants spare the boy and bring the king a poor shepherd's little finger as proof of his deed. The prince changes clothes with the shepherd and wanders off to another kingdom, where he finds work as the royal gardener's assistant. The prince, in his work as a gardener, arranges bouquets for the princesses, and ties a strand of his golden hair to the youngest's. Some time later, the king announces that he shall marry his elder daughter to the one who she gives her bouquet of flowers. The elder marries a prince, and so does the middle one. As for the youngest, she withholds hers until the gardener's assistant passes by her. She then gives the youth her bouquet, they marry and she moves out to his hut. Later, the king falls ill, and only the apples of Paradise can cure him. The gardener's assistant goes to the woods and meets the wild man again, who gives King Goldenlocks a club and orders him to strike a rock: a passage to a lush garden opens for King Goldenlocks to fetch the apples and rush out of the garden. It happens thus, and King Goldenlocks, the apples in his pocket, goes to a tavern and meets his brothers-in-law, who do not recognize him. King Goldenlocks agrees to let them have the apples, as long as they agree to be marked on their backs with the gallows. Next, the king is still sick, and needs snake's milk. King Goldenlocks follows the wild man's instructions again and gets the snake's milk; he then goes to meet his brothers-in-law again, who take the snake's milk in exchange for marking their backs again. Lastly, war breaks out, and the king sends his sons-in-law to protect the kingdom. King Goldenlocks meets the wild man again, who furnishes him with armour, weapons and a horse for him to join the battle. After three campaigns, King Goldenlocks, as a mysterious knights, receives an injury in his feet, which the king, his father-in-law, dresses with a handkerchief. Back to the castle, the king summons everyone for a banquet, and goes to the gardener's assistant hut to invite him in person. Once there, he sees his injured foot, and realizes the gardener's assistant was the knight at the battlefield. The tale was classified as both type ATU 502, "The Wild Man as a Helper", and ATU 314, "Goldener".

==== Austria ====
Author Karl Haiding collected a tale from an Upper Austrian source with the title Der Pechkappenhans ("The Pitch-Cap Hans"): a prince or count has a young son, who plays with his toy gun in the garden. One day, his father orders his soldiers to capture a mysterious animal that appeared in his garden. He does and places him in a cage in the garden. Some time later, he is playing with his toy gun and shoots it inside the cage. The animal makes an offer: he will return the toy bullet if the boy releases him. The boy agrees and lets him loose. The boy's father learns of this and orders him son to be killed for this affront. His guests try to dissuade him, but a valet takes the boy to the woods to fulfill his lord's orders. In the woods, an old man appears to the pair, and says he will save the boy's life, just as th boy saved his (for he was the animal in the cage). He kills a crocodile, takes its tongue and gives it to the valet, while he takes the boy with him to a hut in the forest. The boy and the old man live together, and the man warns him to not lift a certain lid. One day, while the old man is away, the boy opens up the lid and finds a golden liquid, into which he dips his finger into and tries to clean it in his hair, gilding it. The old man returns and, seeing the boy's golden hair colour, realizes he disobeyed his orders. Reluctantly, he expels the boy to the wide world, but gives him a pitch-cap hat to cover his hair, and says he has but to whistle and the old man will come to his aid. The boy wanders off in the world until he reaches another kingdom, where he takes up a job as a shepherd first, then as assistant to the king's gardener. The boy, who is eventually called "Pechkappen Hansl", summons the old man, who gives him a horse to trample the garden. Later, one of the king's daughters takes an interest in the lowly gardener, and, in a suitor selection test, throws him a golden apple, signifying her choice of husband. After they marry, the princess moves out to the gardener's hut in the palace. Some time later, war breaks out, and the king gives his son-in-law a lame horse. As pitch-cap Hans hides himself, he summons the old man who provides him with another horse, so he can fight to defend his father-in-law's kingdom.

== Adaptations ==
- A literary version exists with the name The Forest Man, where the Wild Man-like character is named "Forest Man".
- Iron John was featured in Grimm's Fairy Tale Classics under its Iron Hans alias with Iron Hans voiced by Richard Epcar in the English dub and the other kingdom's king voiced by Michael Forest in the English dub. At one point during the English dub, the prince's mother the queen called him a giant. In this version, Iron Hans is dressed like a barbarian and put up a fight after emerging from his pond before being subdued, the king of the kingdom that the prince was from is dead, and Iron Hans sends the prince on his way when he let a leaf fall on his lake and the reflection showed that the prince had a fish-like face. The prince does various work for people before becoming a gardener for the local king. After the prince enlists Iron Hans' help to make an army to protect that kingdom, the prince is granted the princess as his bride and he thanks Iron Hans in his mind. A vision of Iron Hans appears in the sky congratulating the prince for becoming a worthy prince.
- The story is featured as an episode of American McGee's Grimm, in which the tale is twisted into a Terminator-like setting.
- An episode from the fourth season of Grimm titled "Iron Hans" is loosely based on the story, and the episode "Cat and Mouse", from the first season, uses a line from it as an opening quote.
- The Iron John tale appears in Harry Harrison's The Stainless Steel Rat Sings The Blues (1994) as an allegory for children coming of age.
- Anne Sexton wrote an adaptation as a poem called "Iron Hans" in her collection Transformations (1971), a book in which she re-envisions sixteen of the Grimm's Fairy tales.
- Alphaville's 1994 song Iron John starts with a sketchy retelling of the first half of the story. The rest is about an opportunistic career in an unspecified profession in a more modern setting.
- Iron John appears in the 2015 American superhero film Avengers Grimm, portrayed by Lou Ferrigno.

== Legacy ==
In 1991, Robert Bly analyzed the story in Iron John: A Book About Men. Bly's reading analyzes the story for lessons about masculinity applicable to 20th-century men, and became a major work of the mythopoetic men's movement.

== See also ==
- Enkidu – A Sumerian wild man
- Feral child
- Wild man
- The Gold-bearded Man – A similar story from Italy.
- Guerrino and the Savage Man – Another similar story from Italy.
- The Hairy Man – A similar story from Hungary.
- Făt-Frumos with the Golden Hair
