= The Hairy Man =

Russian fairy tale

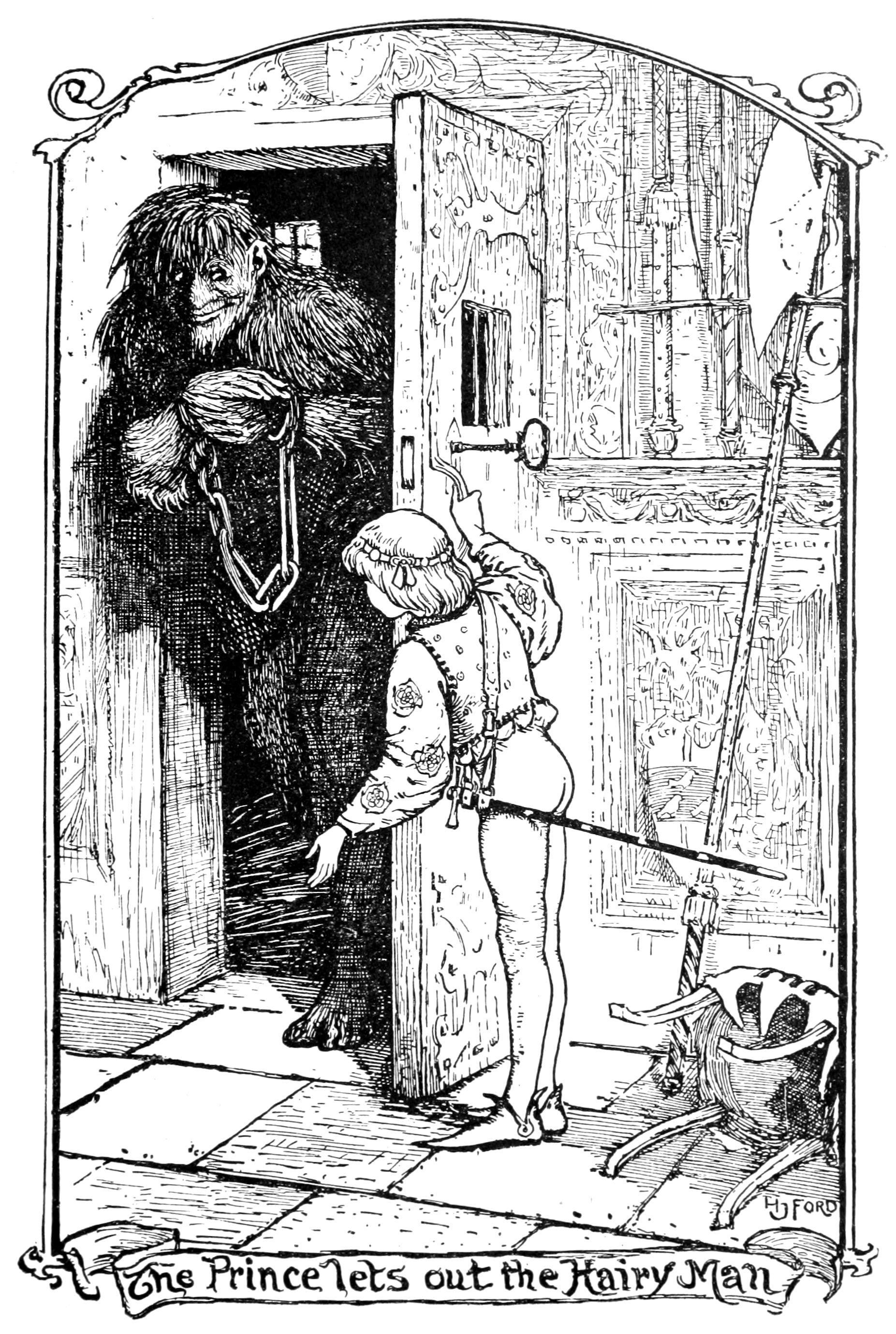

Folk tale
- Name: The Hairy Man
- Aarne–Thompson grouping: ATU 502, "The Wild Man as Helper"
- Country: Russia
- Published in: The Crimson Fairy Book

The Hairy Man is a Russian fairy tale. Andrew Lang included it in The Crimson Fairy Book.

== Synopsis ==
Two ricks of a king's rapeseed fields are burned every night. He offered 900 crowns to whoever caught the culprit responsible. Anyone who failed to catch the culprit or keep the king's rapeseed fields safe will be executed. Nobody has had any luck with either one as 99 people were executed.

Finally, a shepherd with dogs named "Psst" and "Hush" keeps watch and catches the culprit who happens to be a wild man who is covered in animal hair as if he was almost an animal. The King puts him in a cage. The Hairy Man pleads with the King's son so earnestly that the young prince frees him. For this, the King orders that his son be taken to the forest and killed, and that his lungs and liver be brought back as proof. The man who takes him can not do it and kills an old sick dog instead.

The boy wanders the forest. Years later, he comes upon a cottage, where an old man lives. Relating his story, the boy learns that the man in question was the same Hairy Man he freed. He stays at the Hairy Man's cottage for seven years, working hard like a peasant, but never complaining until he is old enough to travel on. Before he leaves, the Hairy Man gives the boy a golden apple (which magically contains a golden staff and a golden-maned horse), a silver apple (which contains a silver staff and an army of hussars), and a copper apple (which contains a copper staff and an army of foot soldiers). The boy uses the first apple, and embarks on his journey, finally pledging his service to a distant king.

One day, the king (who only has a small army) is threatened by a very powerful king. The boy uses his second magic apple to provide reinforcements for his king. The king's youngest princess gives him a ring, and he carries it and half of a handkerchief his sister gave him into battle. The prince's men defeat the enemy so thoroughly that only two survivors are deliberately permitted to escape as messengers to the king who sent them. The prince falls in love with the youngest princess and he gives her the copper apple. The princess has already discovered who he really is after having his room searched, which turned up the half handkerchief. When the king learns that he is a prince as well as a brave and honorable hero, the king is more than happy to allow him to marry his youngest daughter.

== Analysis ==
=== Tale type ===
Russian scholarship classifies the tale as type 502, "Медный лоб" ("Copper Head"), of the East Slavic Folktale Classification (Russian: СУС, romanized: SUS): the prince frees the king's, his father, captive and is banished from home; he arrives at another court where his uncle usurps his place and he is forced to act as his servant; the exiled prince defeats an army or kills a zmei with the help of the now released captive. The tale is classified in the international Aarne-Thompson-Uther Index as tale type ATU 502, "The Wild Man as Helper": the king captures a wild man in the woods, but his son, the prince, releases him; in return, the wild man agrees to help him; the prince eventually gains a princess with the help of the wild man.

=== Motifs ===
According to Jack Haney, the story has existed in Russian since 1786, in printed editions. The captive can also be a bogatyr or a forest spirit (leshii), and "not infrequently" linked to copper.

== Variants ==
This tale is known throughout Europe, in such variants as Iron John, Georgic and Merlin, and Guerrino and the Savage Man. A more widespread variant, found in Europe, Asia, and Africa, opens with the prince for some reason being the servant of an evil being, where he gains the same gifts, and the tale proceeds as in this variant; one such tale is The Magician's Horse. The East Slavic folktale index reports variants from Russia, Belarus, and Ukraine.

=== Bashkir people ===
In a tale from the Bashkir people with the title "златовласый егет" ("The Golden-Haired Eget"), a kingdom is suffering from mysterious attacks in a swamp, and its king orders his soldiers to investigate. They capture an old man who was a tabib healer and take him to prison. One day, the king's son, a prince, sees the old man playing a pipe in his cell, which greatly interests him. The old man promises to give him the pipe if the prince finds him the key. The prince gets the key from his mother and releases the old man. He escapes, and the king punishes his wife. The prince takes the blame and is banished by the king to the swamp. The prince feels afraid for his life, but meets the same old man, who takes the boy to his swamp hut. One day, he directs the boy to a magic well in the swamp, then tells him to take a dip in it; the prince does and his hair turns gold. One year later, the old man gives the prince some potions that increase his strength, and asks him if he wants to be a gardener. The prince agrees and the old man takes him to a king's castle so he can work as a gardener, alongside the previous one. The second king hires him, and the prince plants apple trees in the garden. The king's three daughters, the princesses, take turns bringing food to the gardeners. One time, the third princess takes some food to them, and falls in love with the golden-haired one. Some time later, the second king announces that whoever proves himself to be the most valiant eget, shall marry a princess. The golden-haired gardener goes back to the old tabib healer in the swamp and asks him to make him a valiant eget so he can win the hand of the youngest princess. The old man dowses him with the strength potion and he returns to the kingdom. The next day, the king assembles a crowd of egets, riders and knights, and orders his eldest daughter to throw a golden apple to the crowd. The knights fight against each other to fetch the apple, and the gardener, in disguise, grabs it for himself, but, since he wants the youngest's, throws it to another person in the crowd. The middle daughter casts hers, then the youngest. The gardener grabs it and marries the third princess, with the people's approval. Later, the gardener, now king after his father-in-law, writes his own parents a letter telling he survived being abandoned in the swamp.

== See also ==
- Iron John
- Little Johnny Sheep-Dung
- Snow White
- The Gold-bearded Man
- The Water of Life
- Water and Salt
