= Little Johnny Sheep-Dung =

French fairy tale

Little Johnny Sheep-Dung (French: Petit Jean La Crotte de Mouton) is a French fairy tale collected by Achille Millien and Paul Delarue.

The story is classified in the international Aarne-Thompson-Uther Index as ATU 314, "Goldener" (previously, "The Youth Transformed to a Horse"), in a cycle that begins with the protagonist working for the antagonist and escaping from him on a talking horse.

== Origin ==
According to Paul Delarue's notes, the tale was collected by Achille Millien in 1889 from a man named Charles Ledoux, from Pougues-les-Eaux, Nièvre.

== Synopsis ==
A good-for-nothing boy once begged a sheepskin from butchers; it was so filthy he came to be called "Little Johnny Sheep-Dung". One day, he met a bourgeois on a horse, who hired him on the promise of little work and feeding him; Johnny did not realize that he was the Devil. At his home, the Devil showed him a horse (actually a prince he had transformed to that shape) and told him to beat it every morning. Johnny did, but not hard, for fear of tiring himself. After a few days, the horse warned him that he worked for the Devil, told him to take ten sacks of the Devil's gold, and had him ride off on it. They rode through an ocean, where waters opened for them. The Devil chased them, but every time he came close, the horse had Johnny drop a sack, so the Devil stopped to pick the money up. When the tenth sack was dropped, they escaped the other side, and the waters closed on the Devil and drowned him.

Soon they reached the king's castle, where the king thought his son had been lost hunting. The horse told Johnny to work as a gardener; they would set him to tend strawberries, and he should cut them at the root and lie down beside them. He did that, and fell asleep. His sheepskin vanished, and he was wearing fine clothing. The youngest princess saw him, he was very handsome, and she fell in love. When he woke, the strawberries were ripe, and he was wearing his sheepskin. He went back to the horse, and it had a man's head. The next day, the horse sent him. They put him to tend the arbors, and at the horse's command, he cut all their roots and slept. The youngest princess again saw him looking handsome, the arbors grew back and held fruit by the time he woke, and the horse had become a man to his waist. The third day, the horse sent him again, he planted the spade in the ground he was supposed to spade and slept, the youngest princess admired him again, the ground was all spaded when he woke, and the horse was a man again.

The king was thinking of marrying off his daughters. His older two were promised to two princes, but the youngest had refused all matches. She went to her father and told him she wanted to marry Johnny. The king did not want to, but she insisted, and so they were promised. Then the king called all three of the men and told them that the one who defeated the other two would get his crown. The princes set out on fractious horses and scorned Johnny, on a lame horse, but when they had ridden by, the horse and his clothing were changed to a fine horse and outfit. He rode after and told them he had come to fight in Johnny's place. They fought and did not injure each other, and Johnny rode off. A second day, it went the same, but the third, Johnny wounded both the others. He went back with them and revealed who he was; the youngest princess was not surprised. The king said the crown was his. Johnny said it belonged to his son, and when the king said that his son was dead, he brought him to the court. The marriages were performed, the son became king, and Johnny was his most loyal friend.

== Analysis ==
=== Tale type ===
The tale is classified in the international Aarne-Thompson-Uther Index as tale type ATU 314, "Goldener" (previously, "The Youth Transformed to a Horse"). The type is also called "The Golden Story" (Das goldene Märchen), because in many variants, the hero's hair is turned to gold. Other tales like this include The Magician's Horse and The Gifts of the Magician.

In the Catalogue of French Folktales, French scholars Paul Delarue and Marie-Louise Thèneze classify the tale as type 314, "Le Petit Jardinier aux Cheveux d'Or ou Le Teigneux" ("The Golden-Haired Little Gardener, or the Scaldhead").

==== Introductory episodes ====
Scholarship notes three different opening episodes to the tale type: (1) the hero becomes a magician's servant and is forbidden to open a certain door, but he does and dips his hair in a pool of gold; (2) the hero is persecuted by his stepmother, but his loyal horse warns him and later they both flee; (3) the hero is given to the magician as payment for the magician's help with his parents' infertility problem. Folklorist Christine Goldberg, in Enzyklopädie des Märchens, related the second opening to former tale type AaTh 532, "The Helpful Horse (I Don't Know)", wherein the hero is persecuted by his stepmother and flees from home with his horse. (Note: According to Stith Thompson's 1961 revision of the index, in type 532 the hero's helpful horse advises him to answer every question with the sentence "I don't know".)

American folklorist Barre Toelken recognized the spread of the tale type across Northern, Eastern and Southern Europe, but identified three subtypes: one that appears in Europe (Subtype 1), wherein the protagonist becomes the servant to a magical person, finds the talking horse and discovers his benefactor's true evil nature, and acquires a golden colour on some part of his body; a second narrative (Subtype 3), found in Greece, Turkey, Caucasus, Uzbekistan and Northern India, where the protagonist is born through the use of a magical fruit; and a third one (Subtype 2). According to Toelken, this Subtype 2 is "the oldest", being found "in Southern Siberia, Iran, the Arabian countries, Mediterranean, Hungary and Poland". In this subtype, the hero (who may be a prince) and the foal are born at the same time and become friends, but their lives are at stake when the hero's mother asks for the horse's vital organ (or tries to kill the boy to hide her affair), which motivates their flight from their homeland to another kingdom.

=== Motifs ===
Besides that alternation, it is uncommon for the horse to be transformed back into a man in parts; usually, the horse orders the hero to behead it, which transforms it.
