= Tale of Tales (2015 film) =

- Theatrical release poster
- Italian: Il racconto dei racconti
- Directed by: Matteo Garrone
- Written by: Edoardo Albinati; Ugo Chiti; Matteo Garrone; Massimo Gaudioso
- Based on: Pentamerone by Giambattista Basile
- Produced by: Matteo Garrone; Jean Labadie; Jeremy Thomas
- Starring: Salma Hayek; Vincent Cassel; Toby Jones; John C. Reilly
- Cinematography: Peter Suschitzky
- Edited by: Marco Spoletini
- Music by: Alexandre Desplat
- Production companies: Archimede Film; HanWay Films; Recorded Picture Company
- Distributed by: 01 Distribution (Italy); Le Pacte (France); Curzon Artificial Eye (United Kingdom)
- Release dates: 14 May 2015 (Cannes/Italy); 1 July 2015 (France); 1 July 2016 (UK)
- Running time: 134 minutes
- Countries: Italy; France; United Kingdom
- Language: English
- Budget: $14.5 million
- Box office: $5.5 million

Tale of Tales is a 2015 fantasy horror film co-written, directed and co-produced by Matteo Garrone and starring Salma Hayek, Vincent Cassel, Toby Jones, and John C. Reilly. It is based on a collection of fairy tales by Italian poet Giambattista Basile, titled Pentamerone. The three main tales that inspired the film are La Cerva Fatata (The Enchanted Doe), La Pulce (The Flea), La Vecchia Scorticata (The Flayed Old Lady). An Italian-led production with co-producers in France and the United Kingdom, Tale of Tales is Garrone's only English-language film. It competed for the Palme d'Or at the 2015 Cannes Film Festival.

== Plot ==
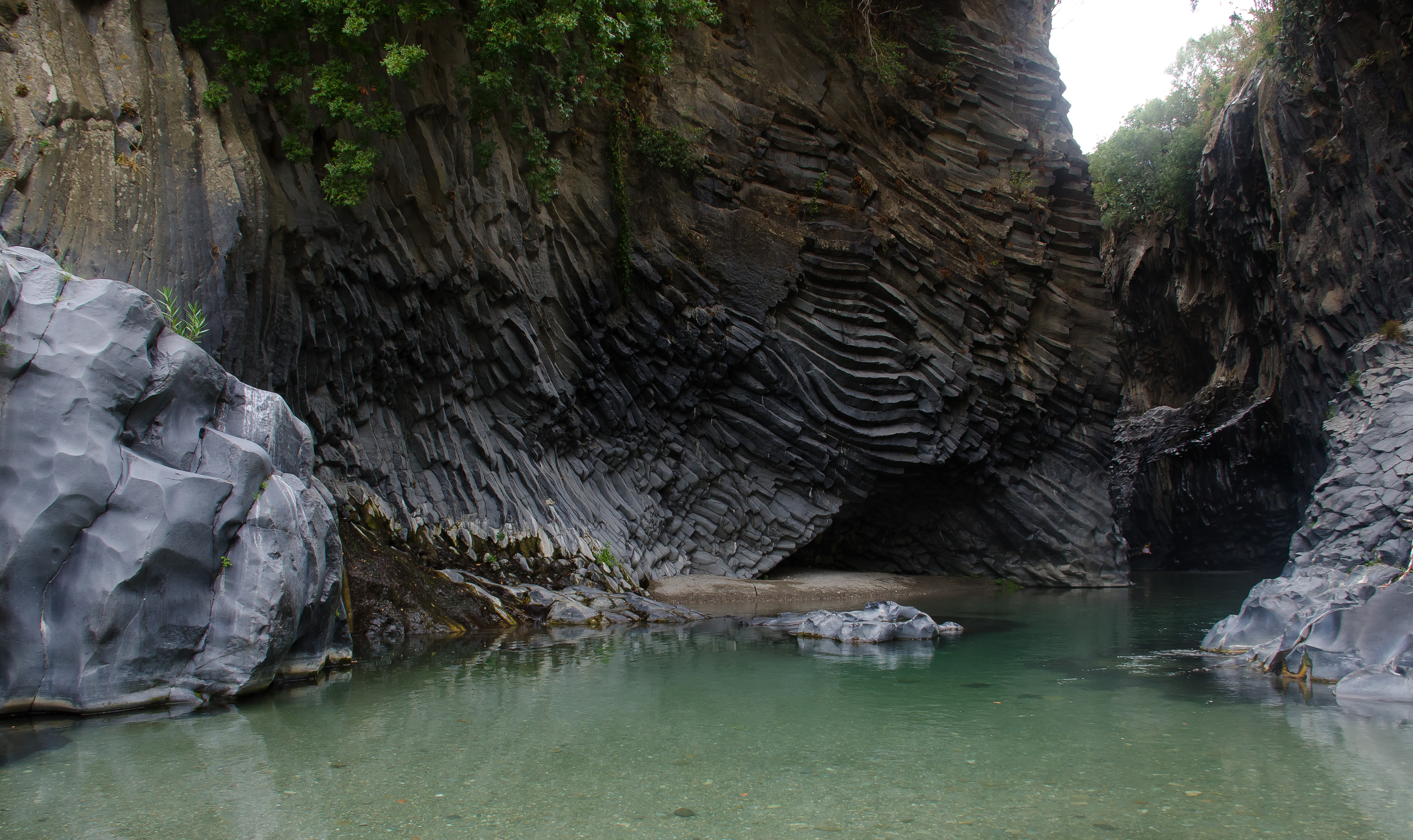
The Alcantara river in Sicily, the location for the scenes with the aquatic dragon

=== The Enchanted Doe ===
In the Kingdom of Longtrellis, the King and Queen cannot conceive a child. A necromancer suggests that if the Queen eats a sea dragon's heart cooked by a virgin, she will be with child, but this will cost a life. The King slays the sea dragon but dies from his wounds. The virgin cook prepares the heart and becomes pregnant and the Queen eats the heart and the next day bears a son, Elias, with hair as white as the dragon. The cook also gives birth to a boy, Jonah. The boys are identical and inseparable friends. This so vexes the Queen that she attempts to murder Jonah, though he manages to escape. Jonah leaves the kingdom, plunging a knife into a tree root and telling Elias that as long as the root spouts clear water, he is alive and well. One day, the water is clouded with blood. Elias leaves to find Jonah. The Queen has her subjects search for Elias to no avail. The necromancer blames the Queen and says the youths are truly inseparable and that her violent desire can be achieved only through violence. Elias finds Jonah wounded in a cave. They are threatened by a monster, which wounds Jonah but hesitates to attack Elias, who kills the monster and returns Jonah to his wife. In the cave, the monster's corpse dissolves into that of the Queen.

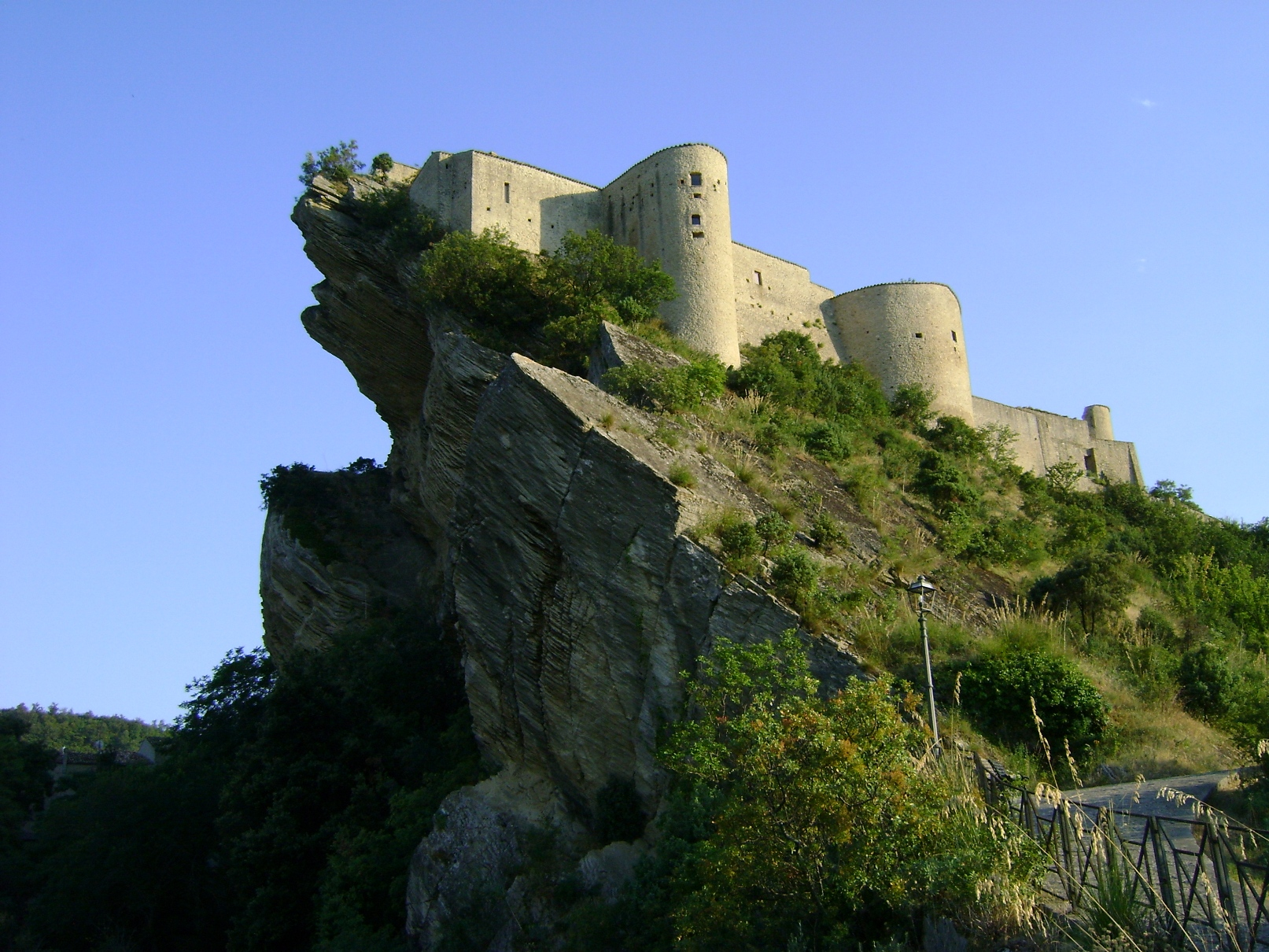
The King of Strongcliff's castle (the Castle of Roccascalegna in Abruzzo, southern Italy)

=== The Flayed Old Lady ===
The lustful King of Strongcliff is intrigued by the sound of a woman's heavenly singing. He courts her outside her home, unaware that she is one of two elderly sisters, Imma and Dora. Dora agrees to spend the night with him as long as it is in complete darkness. He is horrified when he sees her appearance the next morning and has his guards throw her out of a cliffside window. She survives, entangled in the branches of a tree. A witch rescues her and nurses her from her breast. Dora awakens as a young, beautiful maiden. The King comes upon her while hunting and decides to make her his Queen. Dora invites Imma to the wedding and promises to take care of her, but says she cannot stay in the castle. Imma refuses to leave, asking for the secret to her sister's youth and beauty. In annoyance, Dora says she got herself flayed. Finally thrown out after violating the royal couple's privacy in their bedroom, Imma finds someone willing to flay her, leaving her bloody and disfigured. Dora's beauty begins to fade and, unnoticed, she flees the castle.

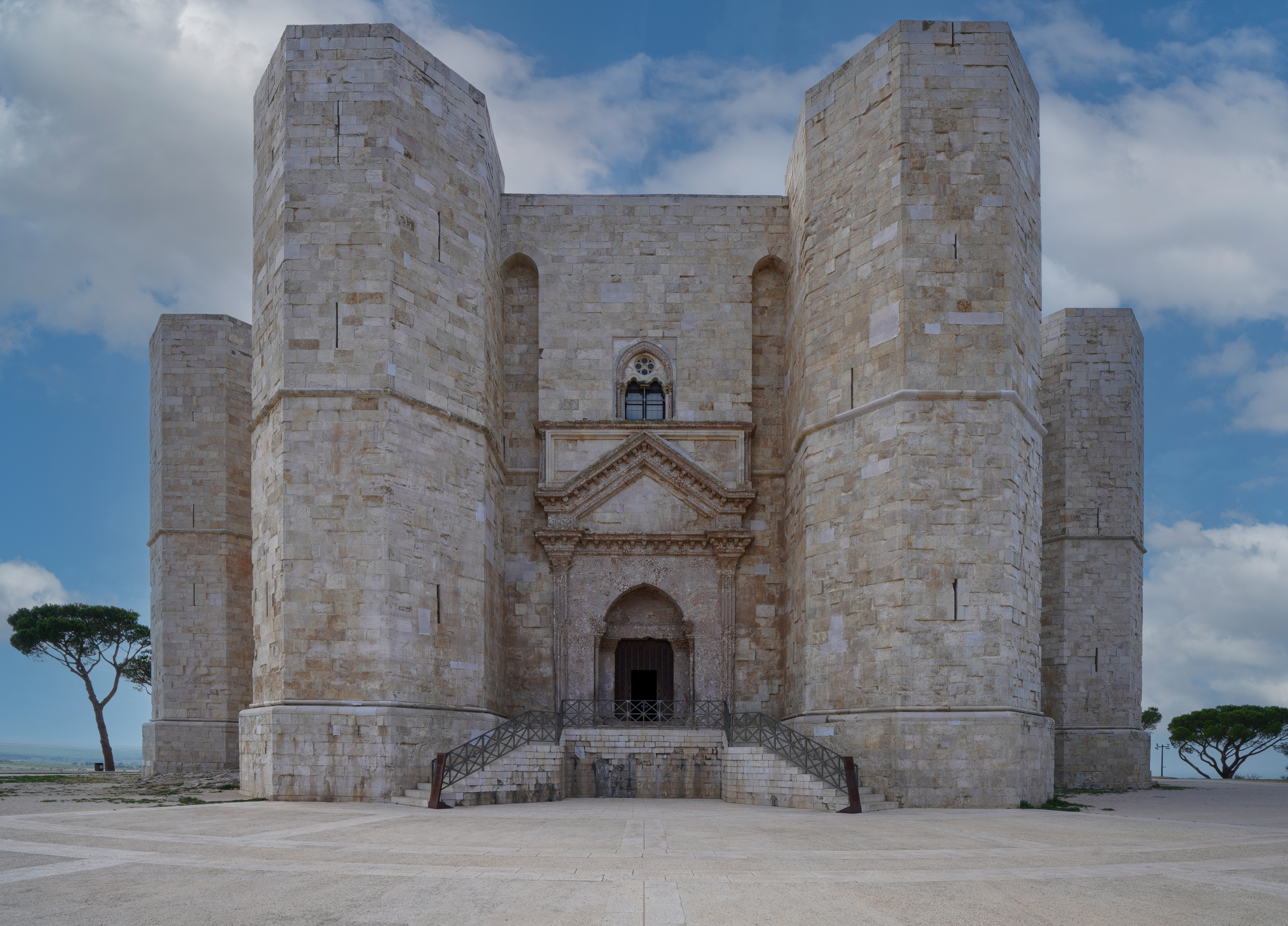
The Home of the King of Highhills and his daughter (Castel del Monte in Apulia, southeast Italy)

=== The Flea ===
The King of Highhills becomes fascinated by a flea, which he hides in his room as a pet. It grows gigantic under his care. When it dies, the King decides to skin it. His daughter Violet tells him she wants to be married, so he offers her as a bride to whoever can guess from what beast the skin was taken, believing no one can do so. However, an ogre correctly identifies the hide by smell. Violet is horrified, but her father says he cannot go back on his word. Violet goes through with the marriage but says her father never loved her. The ogre takes Violet to his cave, where she is kept prisoner. A family of acrobats helps her to escape, but the ogre gives chase and kills the entire family. He is mollified by Violet, who then slits his throat. Violet returns to the castle, where the King has grown ill, and reveals she has the head of the ogre, the husband he "chose" for her. The King falls to his knees crying, and the courtiers follow suit. Violet, too, begins to cry.

Elias, Dora, and the King of Strongcliff are among the guests for Violet's coronation as Queen. There, Elias nods to her and the King of Strongcliff. As Violet's father walks her to the throne, the crowd looks skyward, where an entertainer is walking a tightrope of fire.

== Themes ==
In an interview with Variety, director Matteo Garrone emphasized that the three tales have contemporary themes: "plastic surgery; the frenzied desire to have a child; the conflict between generations; the painful passage from adolescence to adulthood." He has also said that although the three stories have distinct themes, they are all connected to the idea of desire that can lead to obsession. Although screenplays were written for other tales in the Basile collection, those filmed told the story of "a woman in three different stages of her life": youth, motherhood and advancing age.

== Cast ==
- Salma Hayek as Queen of Longtrellis
- Vincent Cassel as King of Strongcliff
- Toby Jones as King of Highhills
- John C. Reilly as King of Longtrellis
- Shirley Henderson as Imma
- Hayley Carmichael as Dora
  - Stacy Martin as young Dora
- Bebe Cave as Violet, Princess of Highhills
- Christian Lees as Elias, Prince of Longtrellis.
- Jonah Lees as Jonah
- Laura Pizzirani as the virgin and Jonah's Mother
- Franco Pistoni as Necromancer
- Jessie Cave as Fenizia
- Michael Martini as the 1st Circus Boy
- Alessandro Campagna as the 2nd Circus Boy
- Lorenzo Bernardi as Contortionist
- Giselda Volodi as Lady-in-Waiting #1
- Giuseppina Cervizzi as Lady-in-Waiting #2
- Luisa Ragusa as Lady-in-Waiting #3
- Kathryn Hunter as Witch
- Guillaume Delaunay as Ogre
- Davide Campagna as Circus Performer
- Massimo Ceccherini as a Circus Artist Father
- Alba Rohrwacher as a Circus Artist Mother
- Catrinel Marlon as 2nd Maid of Honor

== Production ==
=== Development ===
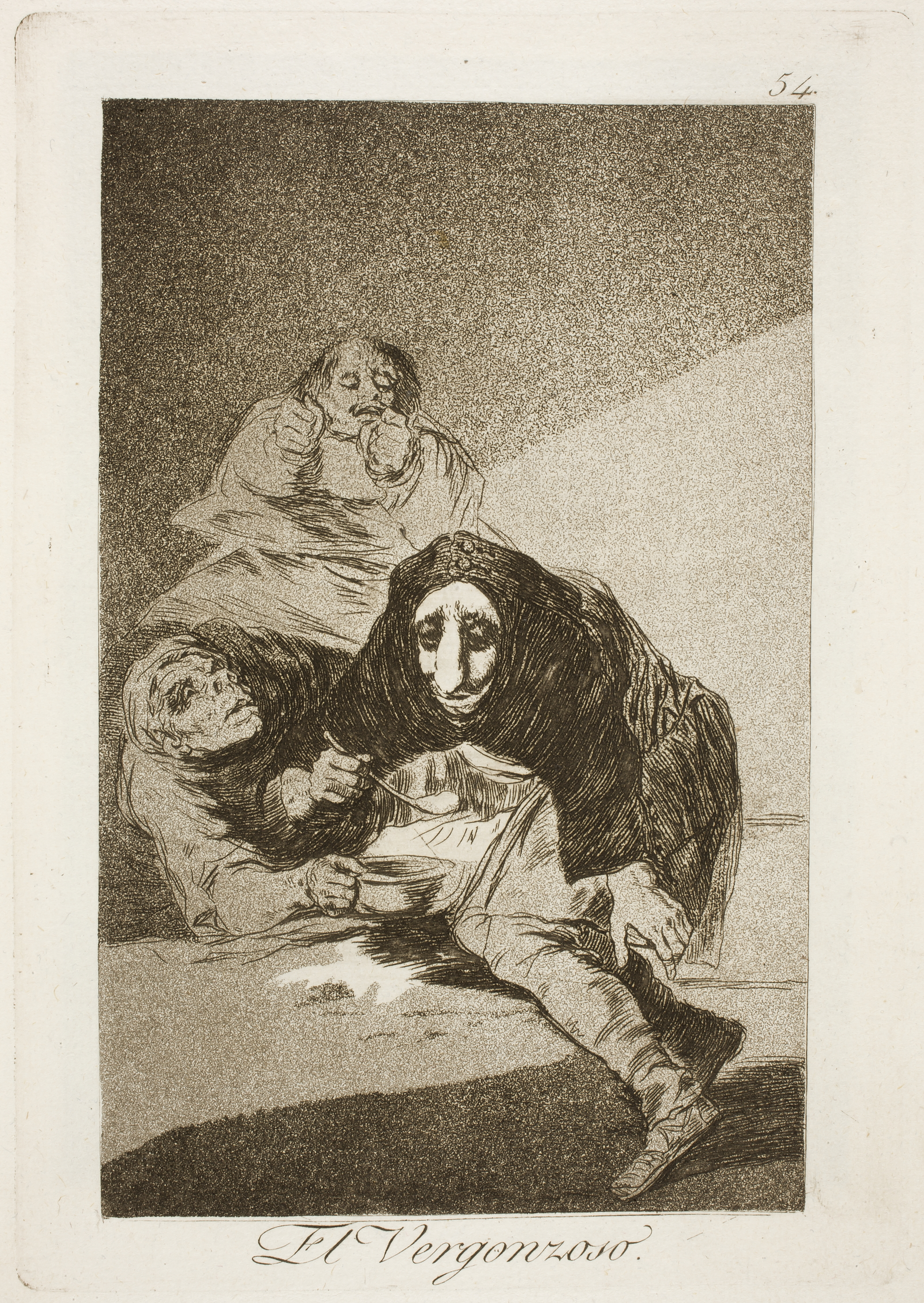
Francisco Goya's Capricho No. 54

According to Matteo Garrone, he was drawn to Giambattista Basile's stories for their mixture of the real and the unreal, and because he found the themes in many of them to still be highly relevant. Garrone had previously been best known for employing a naturalist style in films such as Gomorrah, but argued that all his previous films also have a fairytale aspect to their narratives. An important source of inspiration was Francisco Goya's Los caprichos collection of etchings. For Garrone, they encapsulated the mood of Basile's tales.

Tale of Tales had a budget corresponding to US$14.5 million. It was produced through Garrone's company Archimede Film, with co-production support from France's Le Pact and Britain's Recorded Picture Company. It received financing from Rai Cinema and additional support from MiBACT and Eurimages.

=== Filming ===
Principal photography commenced on 15 May 2014 and lasted four months. The film was shot entirely on location in various parts of Italy, including Naples (Royal Palace, Palace of Capodimonte and its gardens); Apulia's Castel del Monte (octagonal castle appears in the poster near Vincent Cassel), Gioia del Colle (in particular the throne room), Laterza, Mottola, Statte; Sicily's Donnafugata Castle (gothic castle, stone labyrinth and gardens) and Gole dell'Alcantara in Alcantara (mainly scenes of sea dragon); Abruzzo's Castello di Roccascalegna (appears in the poster with Castel del Monte); Tuscany's Moorish castle of Sammezzano, the towns of Sorano and Sovana (tuff caves); and Lazio (Bosco del Sasseto in Viterbo). "The movie is an epic tribute to the history of fairytales with great care to the style of their portrayal. The very locations reflect the director’s intention to create an artificial truth, a realistic craftsmanship. All locations had to be real but look as if the settings had been recreated in a studio set."

== Release ==
=== Critical reception ===
On the review aggregator website Rotten Tomatoes, the film holds an 84% approval rating based on reviews from 105 critics, with an average rating of 7.1/10. The website's critical consensus reads, "Visually splendid and narratively satisfying, Tale of Tales packs an off-kilter wallop for mature viewers in search of something different." On Metacritic, the film has received a weighted average score of 72 out of 100 based on 24 critics, indicating "generally favorable reviews".
