= Sapia Liccarda =

Fairy tale by Giambattista Basile (1636)

Sapia Liccarda is an Italian literary fairy tale written by Giambattista Basile in his 1634 work, the Pentamerone. It is not known whether he had a specific source, either literary or oral, for this tale.

Italo Calvino identified a Florentine tale, The King in the Basket, in his Italian Folktales as a variant on it, while noting the vast difference in tone.

== Synopsis ==
A rich merchant had three daughters, Bella, Cenzolla, and the youngest, Sapia Liccarda. He went on a trip and nailed up all the windows so they could not lean out and gossip, and gave them rings that would stain if they did something shameful. The older sisters managed to lean out anyway.

The king's castle was across the way, and his three sons, Cecciariello, Grazuolo, and Tore, flirted with the three daughters. The older two seduced the older two, but Sapia Liccarda gave Tore the slip, and increased his desire for her. The older two became pregnant. They craved the king's bread, and Sapia Liccarda went to the king's castle to beg it, with a flax comb on her back. She got it, and when Tore tried to seize her, the comb scratched his hand. Then they craved pears, and she went to the royal garden to get them. Tore saw her and climbed a tree to get her the pears, but when he tried to climb down and seize her, she took away the ladder. Finally, the older sisters were delivered of their sons, and Sapia Liccarda went to the castle for the third time, to leave each baby in his father's bed, and a stone in Tore's. The older two were pleased to have such fine young sons, and Tore was jealous of them.

The merchant returned and found the rings of his older two daughters stained. He was ready to beat them when the king's sons asked him to let them marry his daughters. He agreed.

Sapia Liccarda, thinking Tore angry with her, made a fine statue of herself in sugar paste and left it in her bed. Tore came in and stabbed the statue, and said he would suck her blood as well, but when he tasted the sugar paste, it was so sweet that he lamented his wickedness. Sapia Liccarda told him the truth, and they made their peace in the bed.

=== The King in the Basket ===
In Calvino's version, the daughters are instructed to lower a basket to buy whatever they need, and the king tricks them into lifting them up. The youngest, Leonetta, gets her sisters to lower her and plays tricks in his castle. The king asks the merchant to marry one of his daughters and knows that Leonetta is the prankster by her willingness. The sugar figure on the wedding night appears identically in the tale.

== Analysis ==
=== Tale type ===
The tale is classified, in the international Aarne-Thompson-Uther Index, as tale type ATU 879, "The Basil Maiden (Viola)", or "The Sugar Puppet".

=== Motifs ===
According to Nancy Canepa, the name "Sapia" means 'wise', while "Liccarda" is a variation on the name "Riccarda".

== Legacy ==
According to Jack Zipes, French author MMe. L'Héritier used the story to write her tale L'Adroite Princesse ("The Discreet Princess, or The Adventures of Finette").

== See also ==
- Clever Maria
