= Habetrot =

Folklore figure in Border counties of England and Scotland

Habetrot (Habitrot, Habtrot and Habbitrot) is a figure in folklore of the Border counties of Northern England and Lowland Scotland, associated with spinning and the spinning wheel.

== Folktale ==
Habetrot appears in a Selkirkshire folktale which is a variant of the Aarne–Thompson–Uther Index tale type ATU 501, "The Three Old Spinning Women". She is an old, deformed woman who lives underground with a group of other spinsters, all disfigured by their work (some have splayed feet or flat thumbs; in one version of the tale, they all have "long and ugly [lips] because [they] have spun so much, for [they] always wet [their] fingers with them, the easier to draw the thread from the distaff,"). The only other named spinster is Scantlie Mab. Habetrot spun yarn for a local girl and then convinced the girl's new husband that she should never spin again. Similar tales appear in countries such as Germany (such as The Three Spinners) and Norway (The Three Aunts).

== Other Legends ==
According to the folklore of the borders, it was considered unlucky to step upon "unchristened ground" (the graves of stillborn or unbaptised children) and any who did were said to catch "grave-merels" (or "grave-scab") an illness that causes difficulty of breathing and trembling limbs as well as the burning of the skin as if touched by a hot iron. The only way to relieve this was for the afflicted to wear a sack made from linen grown in a field using manure from a farmyard that has not been disturbed for forty years, spun by Habetrot, bleached by an honest bleacher in an honest miller's milldam and sewed by an honest tailor.
