= Ogre =

Legendary monster

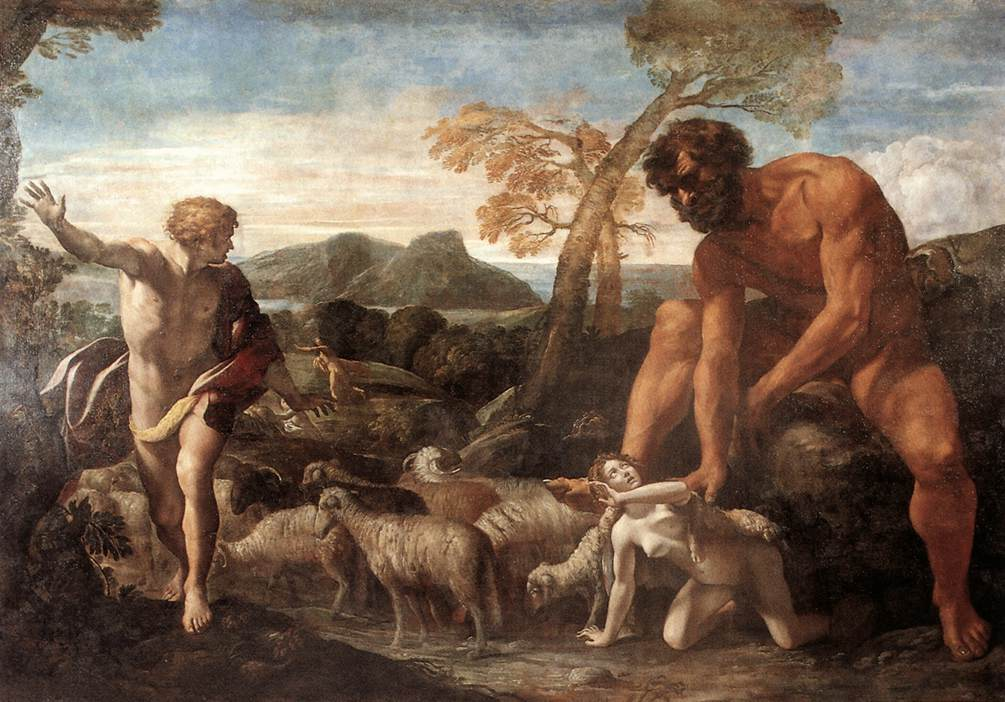
Giovanni Lanfranco: Norandino and Lucina Discovered by the Ogre, oil on canvas, c. 1624

An ogre (feminine: ogress) is a legendary monster depicted as a large, hideous, humanoid being that eats ordinary human beings, especially infants and children. Ogres frequently feature in mythology, folklore, and fiction throughout the world. They appear in many classic works of literature, and are most often associated in fairy tales and legend.

In mythology, ogres are often depicted as inhumanly large, tall, and having a disproportionately large head, abundant hair, unusually colored skin, a voracious appetite, and a strong body. Ogres are closely linked with giants and with human cannibals in mythology. In both folklore and fiction, giants are often given ogrish traits (such as the giants in "Jack and the Beanstalk" and "Jack the Giant Killer", the Giant Despair in The Pilgrim's Progress, and the Jötunn of Norse mythology); while ogres may be given giant-like traits.

Famous examples of ogres in folklore include the ogre in "Puss in Boots" and the ogre in "Hop-o'-My-Thumb". Other characters sometimes described as ogres include the title character from "Bluebeard", the Beast from Beauty and the Beast, Humbaba from the Epic of Gilgamesh, Grendel from Beowulf, Polyphemus the Cyclops from Homer's Odyssey, the man-eating giant in "Sinbad the Sailor" and the oni of Japanese folklore.

== Etymology ==
The word ogre is of French origin, originally derived from the Etruscan god Orcus. Its earliest attestation is in Chrétien de Troyes's late 12th-century verse romance Perceval, li contes del graal, which contains the lines:

Et s'est escrit que il ert ancore,
que toz li reaumes de Logres,
qui jadis fu la terre as ogres,
ert destruite par cele lance.

Translation:

And it is written that he will come again,
to all the realms of Logres,
which was formerly land of ogres,
and destroy them with that lance.

The "ogres" in this rhyme may refer to the ogres who were, in the pseudohistorical work History of the Kings of Britain by Geoffrey of Monmouth, the inhabitants of Britain prior to human settlement.

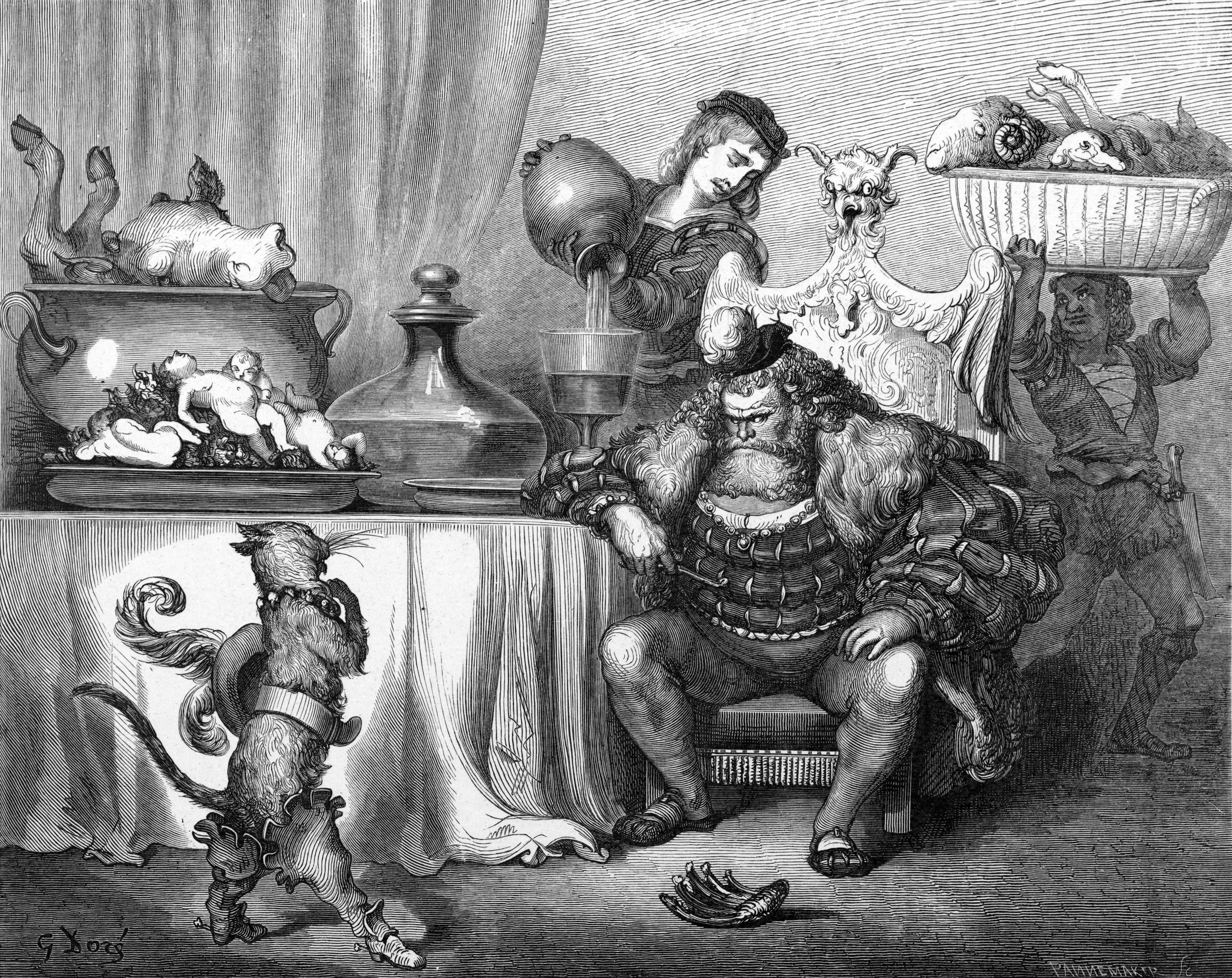
Puss in Boots before the ogre. One of the platters on the table serves human babies (illustrated by Gustave Doré).

The word orco was widely used in Italy at least since 13th century, as attested by Jacomo Tolomei who, in the sonnet "Le favole, compar, ch'om dice tante" ("The many fables, my friend, people tell" – before 1290), compares popular characters of fairy tales, like ogres (whose specific characteristic was to eat people), giants, witches and talking animals, to real people he could see in his city of Siena. The Italian author Giambattista Basile (1575–1632) used the related Neapolitan word uerco, or in standard Italian, orco in some of his tales, and first talks of female orcs (e.g. in "Petrosinella"). This word is also documented in earlier Italian works (Fazio degli Uberti, 14th century; Luigi Pulci, 15th century; Ludovico Ariosto, 15th–16th centuries). An even older related word is Old English orcnēas found in Beowulf lines 112–113, which inspired J.R.R. Tolkien's orc.

The word ogre came into wider usage in the works of Charles Perrault (1628–1703) or Marie-Catherine Jumelle de Berneville, Comtesse d' Aulnoy (1650–1705), both of whom were French authors. The first appearance of the word ogre in Perrault's work occurred in his Histoires ou Contes du temps Passé (1696). It later appeared in several of his other fairy tales, many of which were based on the Neapolitan tales of Basile. The first example of a female ogre being referred to as an ogress is found in his version of Sleeping Beauty, where it is spelled ogresse. Madame d'Aulnoy first employed the word ogre in her story L'Orangier et l'Abeille (1698), and was the first to use the word ogree to refer to the creature's offspring.

== In modern fiction ==
In modern times, ogres have appeared in the Dungeons & Dragons role-playing game as large, powerful humanoid creatures, with below average intelligence, throughout its editions as adversaries but also playable characters. The ogre was counted among the ten best low-level monsters by the authors of Dungeons & Dragons for Dummies. They posit that the ogre "teaches players about fighting big, powerful, stupid monsters, which is an iconic D&D experience".

The green-skinned ogre Shrek is a fictional character created by the American author William Steig that since 1990 has appeared in a book, several movies by DreamWorks Animation, and a musical.

The Ogre Mulgarath is the main antagonist in The Spiderwick Chronicles books series (also adapted into a film and a TV series).

Ogres make up the army of Duke Igthorn, antagonists in Adventures of the Gummi Bears. In this children's TV series, they are presented as anthropomorphized creatures, emphasized through neomedieval trappings in clothing and equipment.

In The Smurfs, ogres like Bigmouth appear human-like but are stouter than humans.

== Fairy tales that feature ogres ==
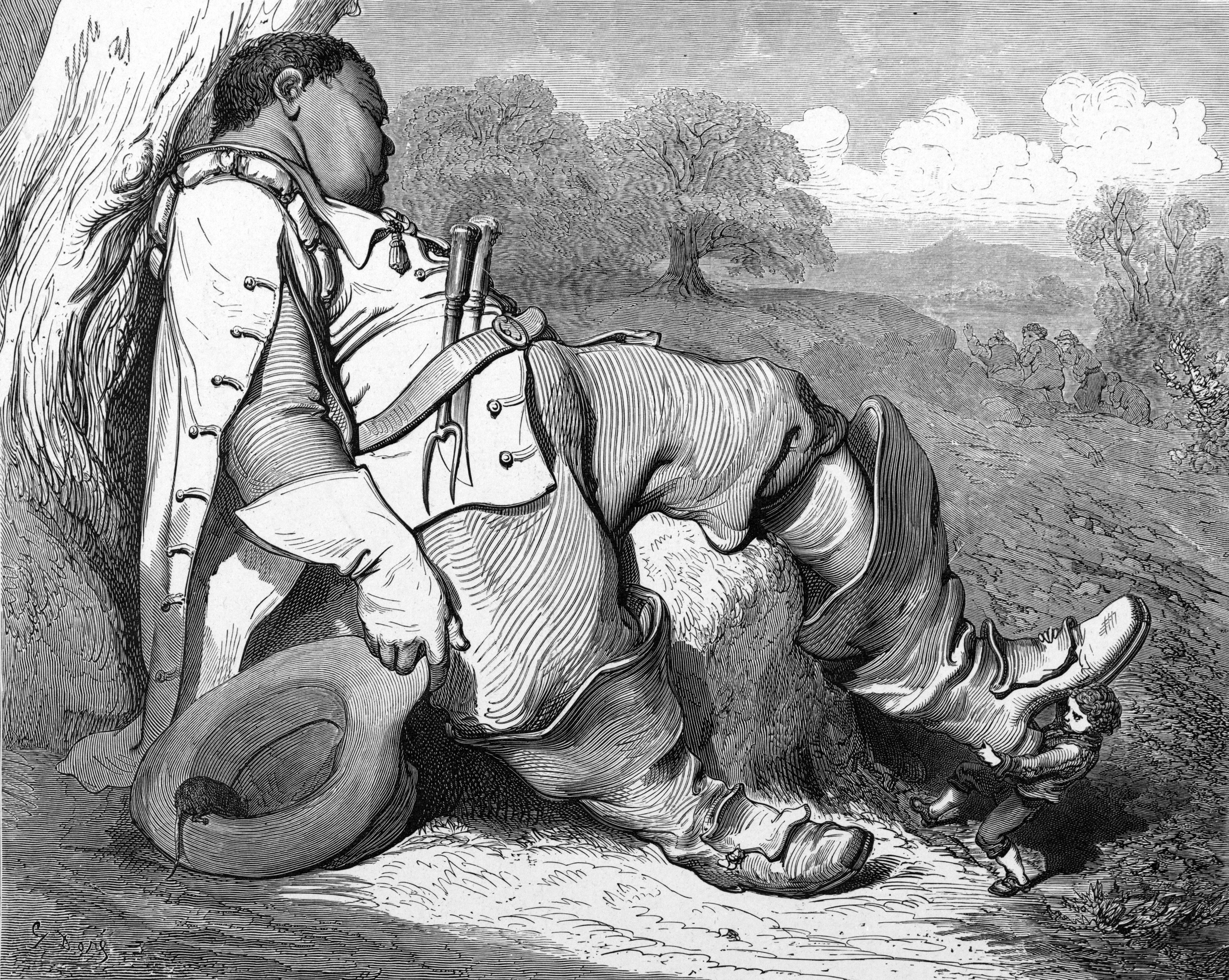
Hop-o'-My-Thumb steals the ogre's seven-league boots (illustrated by Gustave Doré, 1862).

- "Bearskin"
- "The Bee and the Orange Tree"
- "Corvetto"
- "The Dove"
- "The Enchanted Doe"
- "Finette Cendron" or "Cunning Cinders"
- "The Flea"
- "Garulfo"
- "Hop-o'-My-Thumb"
- "Liisa and the Prince"
- "Mr Miacca"
- "Puss in Boots"
- "The Selfish Giant"
- "Sleeping Beauty"
- "Tale of the Ogre"
- "The Three Crowns"
- "Violet"

== Gallery ==
=== In illustration ===
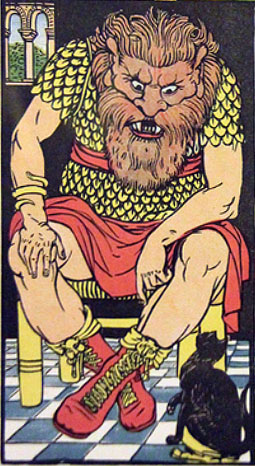
Puss in Boots before the ogre (illustrated by Walter Crane).

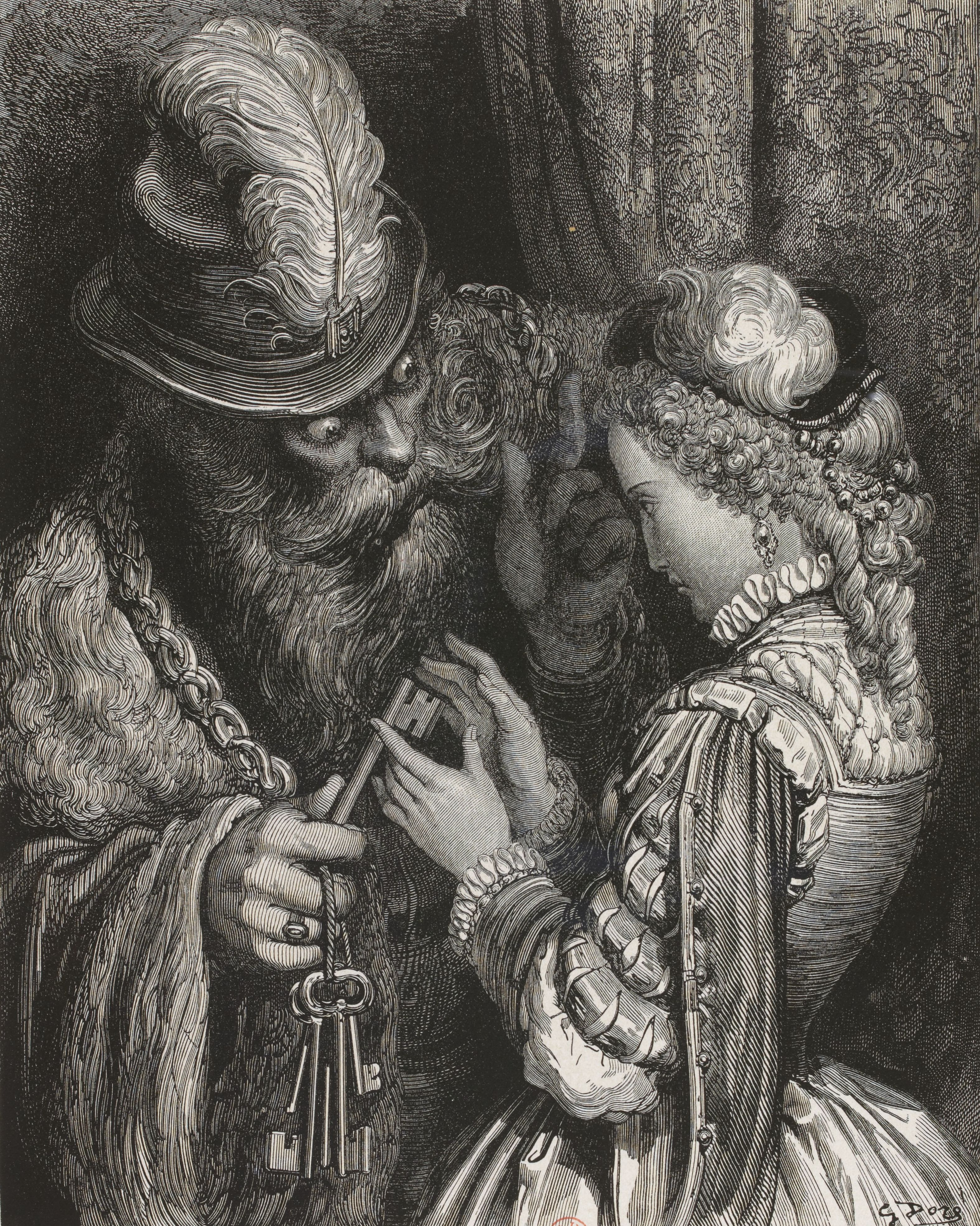
Gustave Doré (1832–1883): Bluebeard, woodcut from an 1862 edition of Histoires ou contes du temps passé

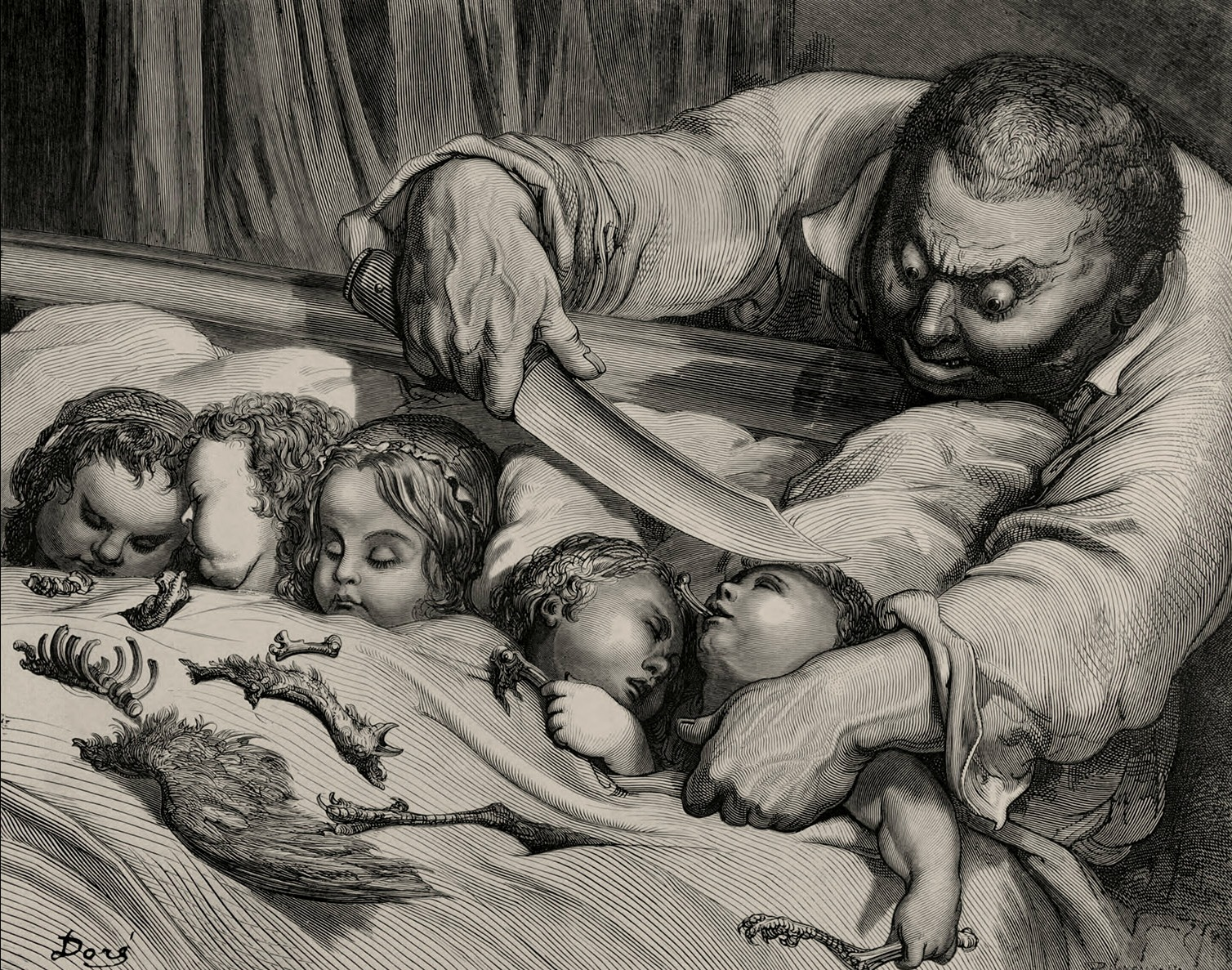
Gustave Doré: Illustration for Le Petit Poucet, 1862

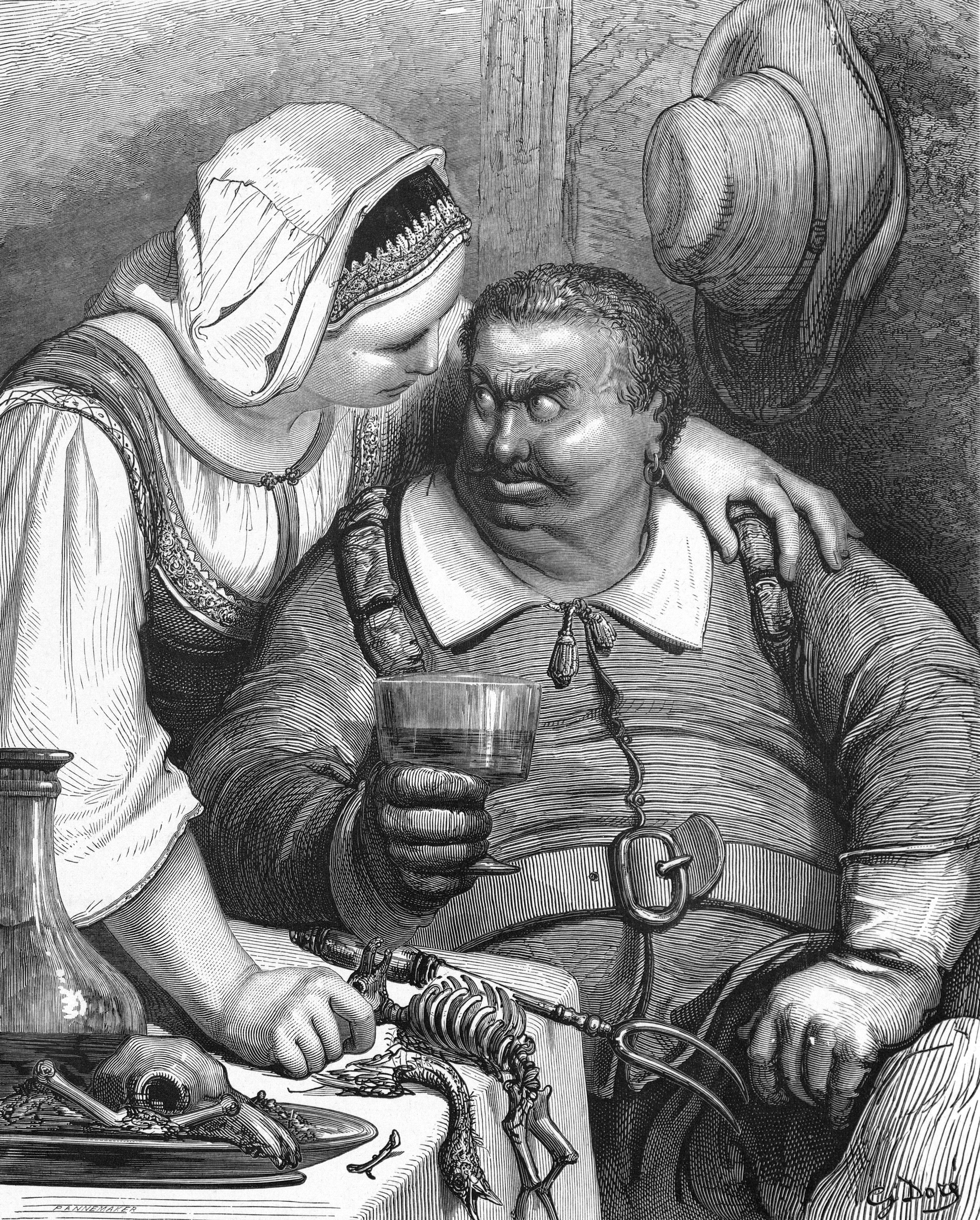
Gustave Doré: Illustration for Le Petit Poucet, 1862

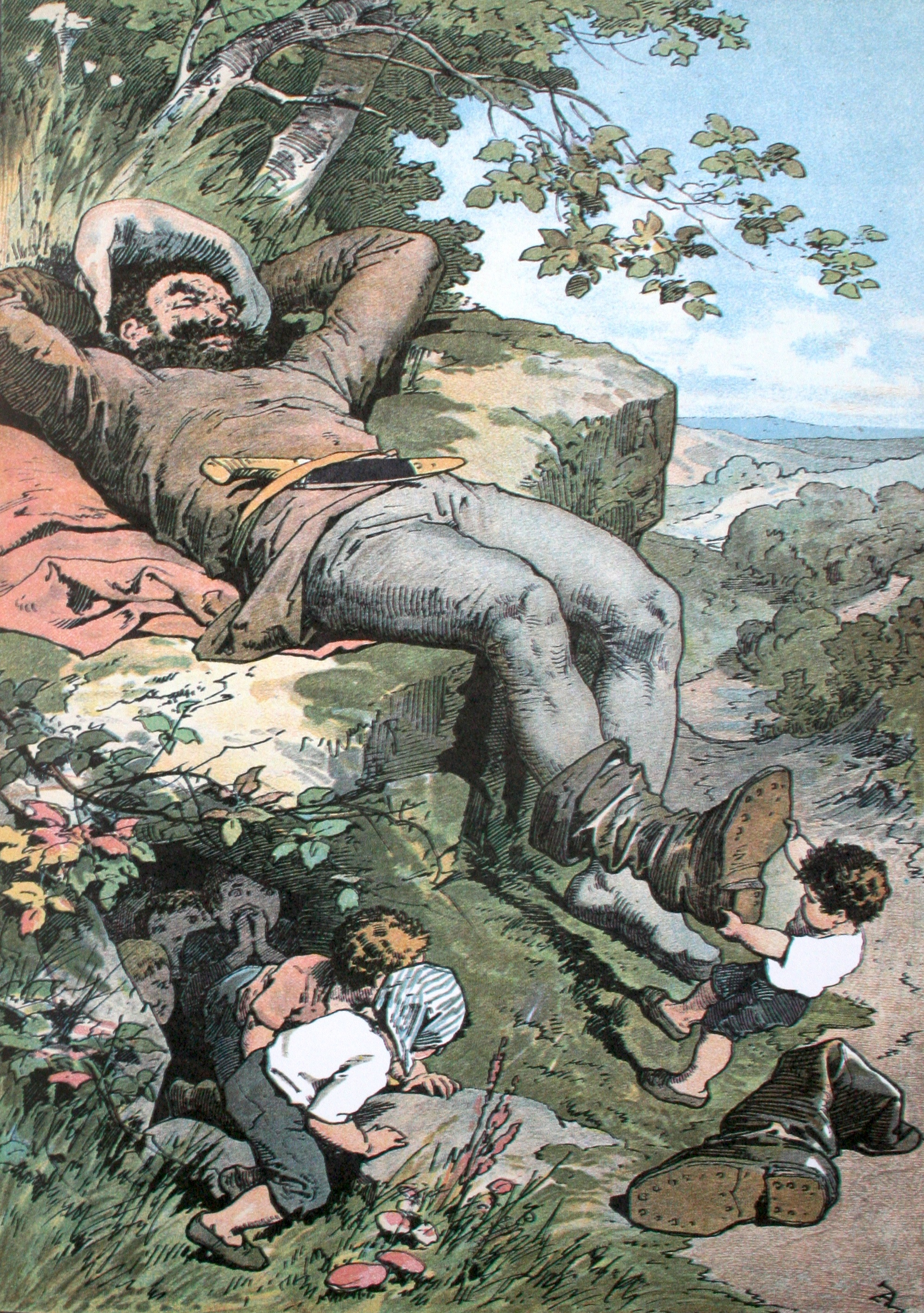
Alexander Zick (1845–1907): Illustration for Der kleine Däumling

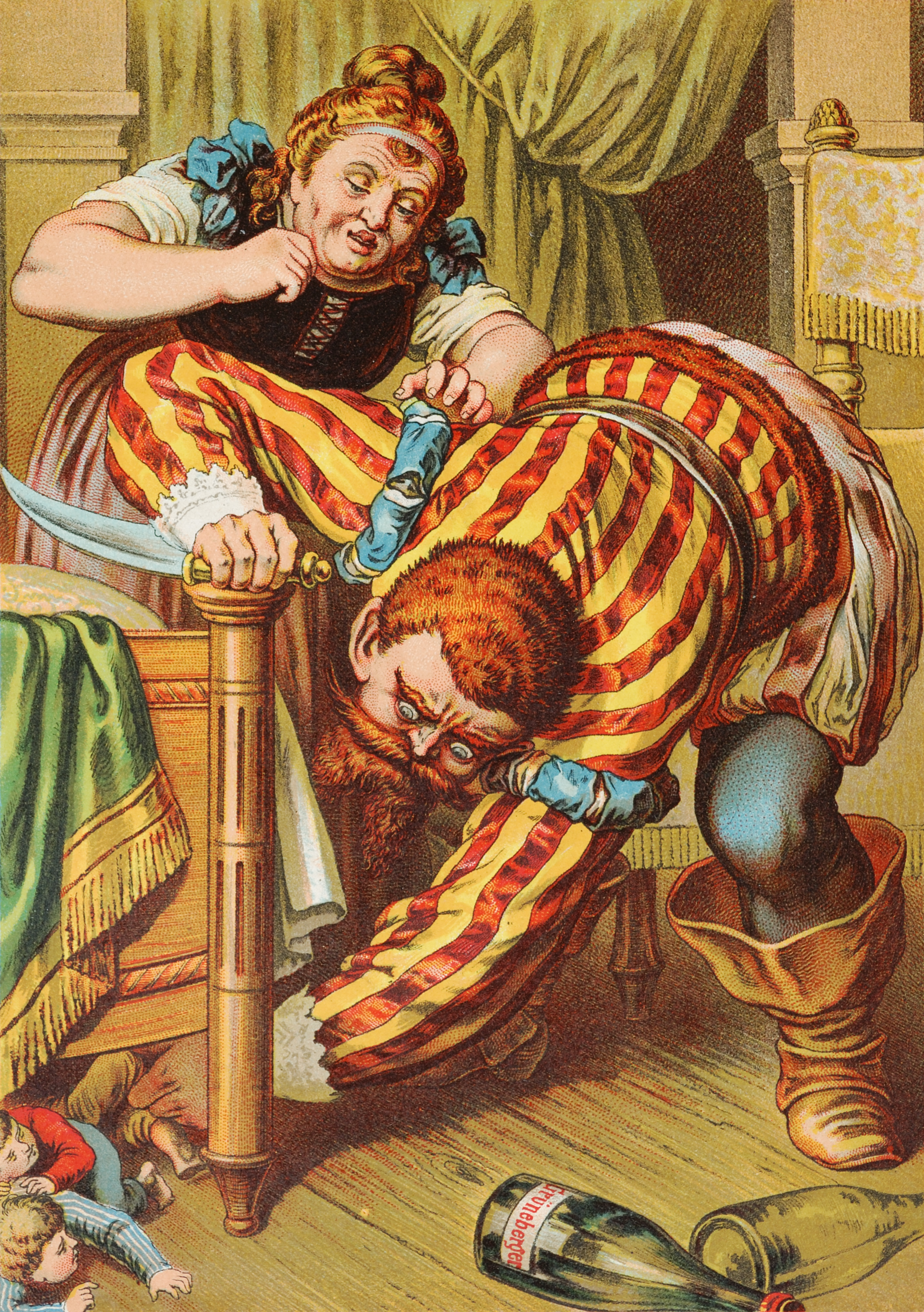
The ogre and his wife, illustration for Hop-o'-My-Thumb from a late-19th-century German fairy tale book

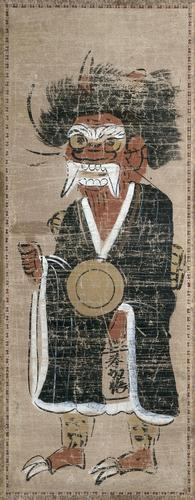
An oni in pilgrim's clothing

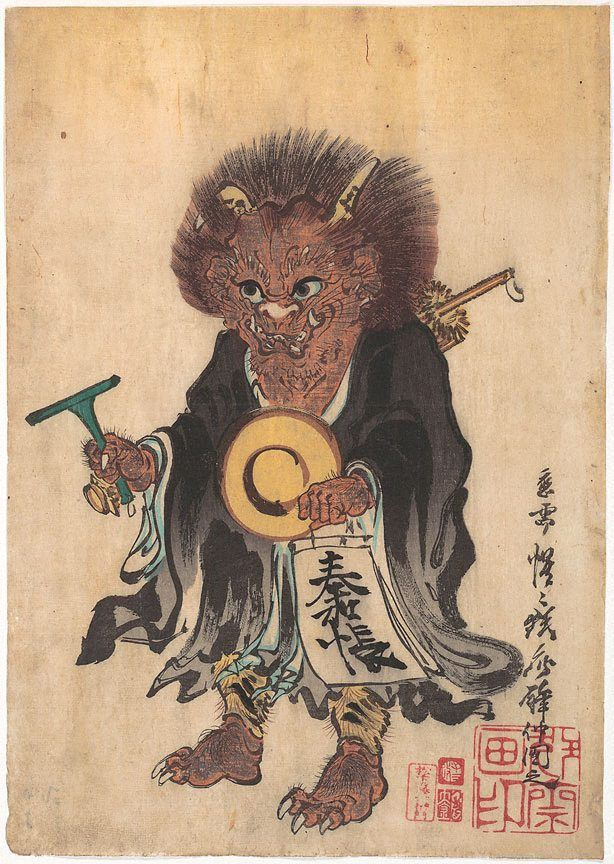
Kawanabe Kyōsai (1831–1889): An oni in wandering Buddhist priest's robes, 1864

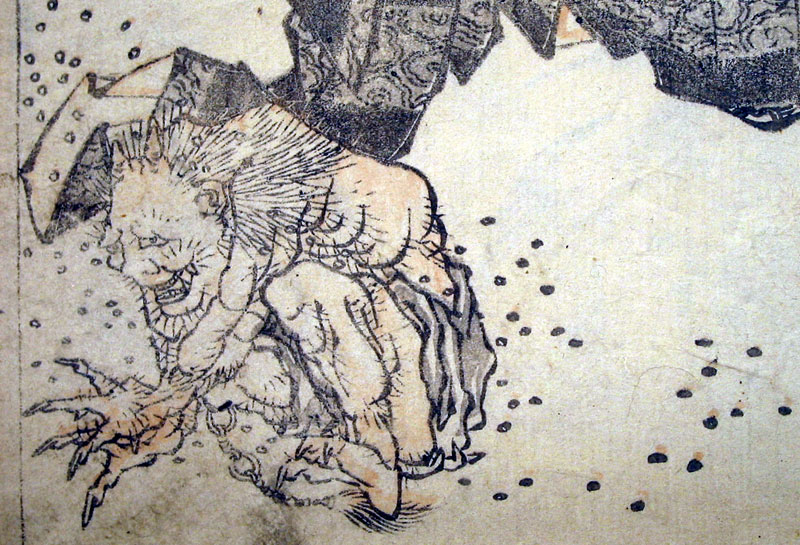
Katsushika Hokusai (1760–1849): An oni being chased away by scattered beans, detail of a print

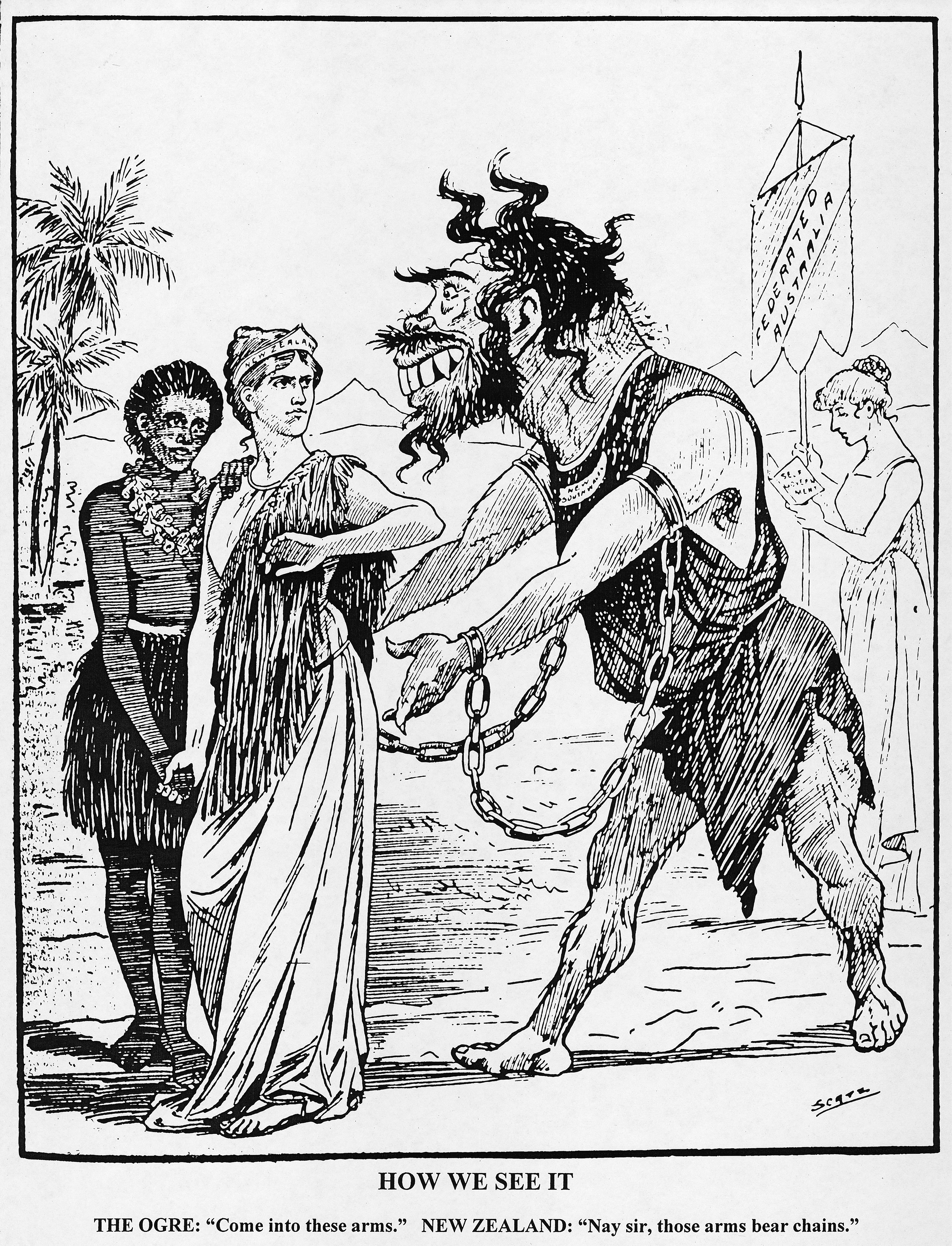
Political cartoon from 1900 depicting Australia as an ogre and referencing its origins as a penal colony

=== In sculpture ===
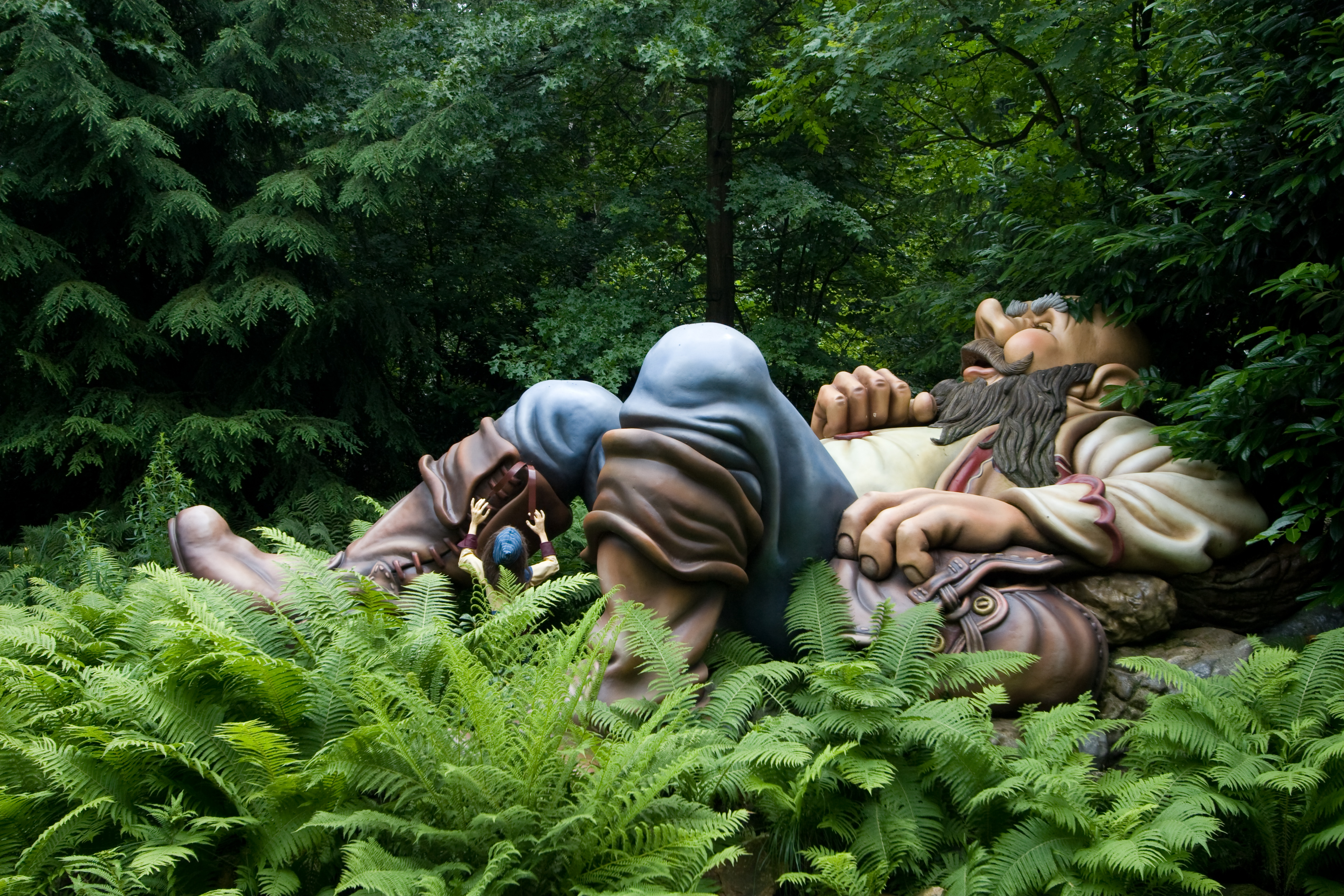
The ogre from Hop-o'-My-Thumb at Efteling, Netherlands. In the Dutch version he is described as a reus, meaning 'giant'.

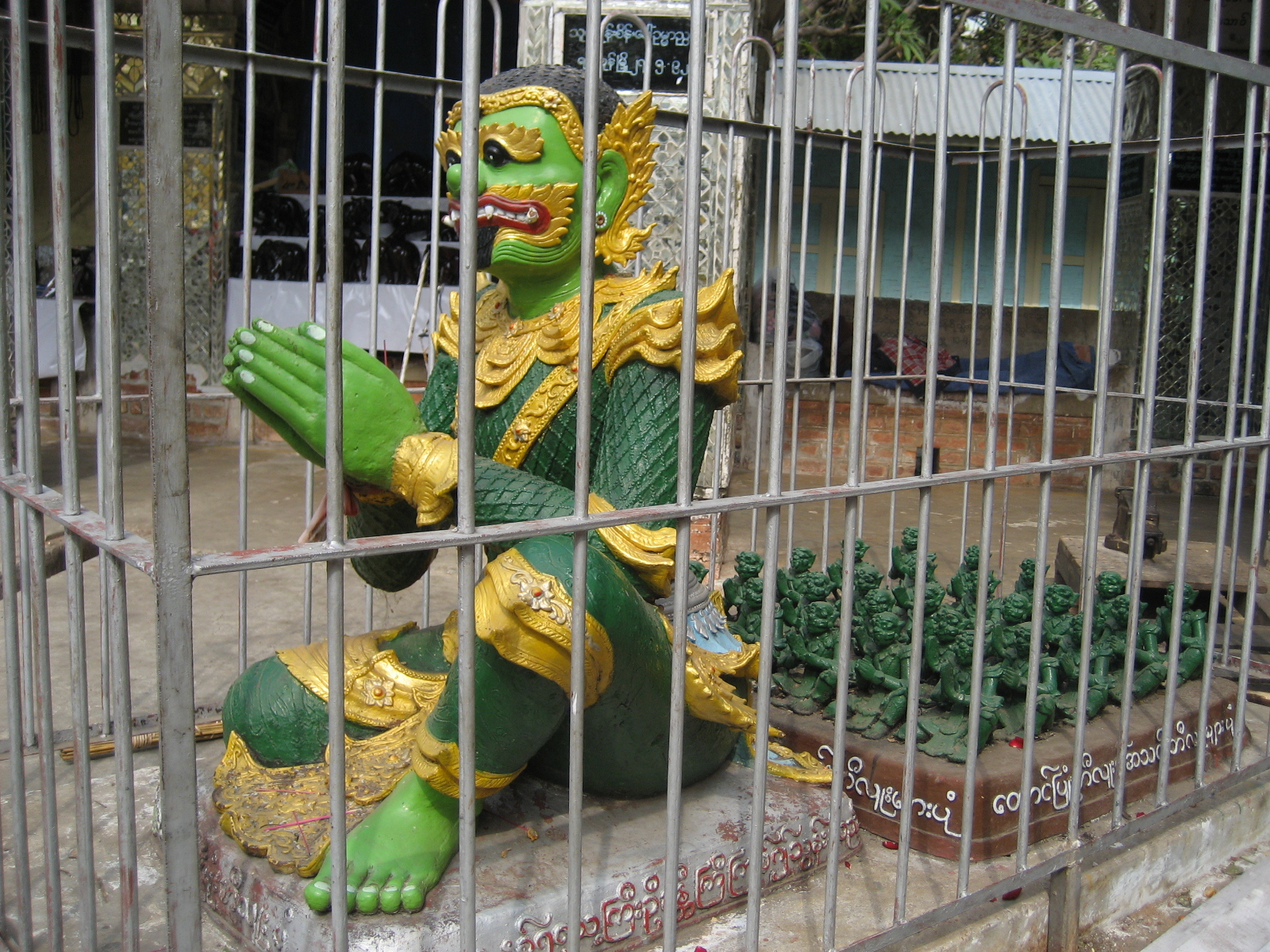
An ogre king represented at Mandalay Hill, Myanmar

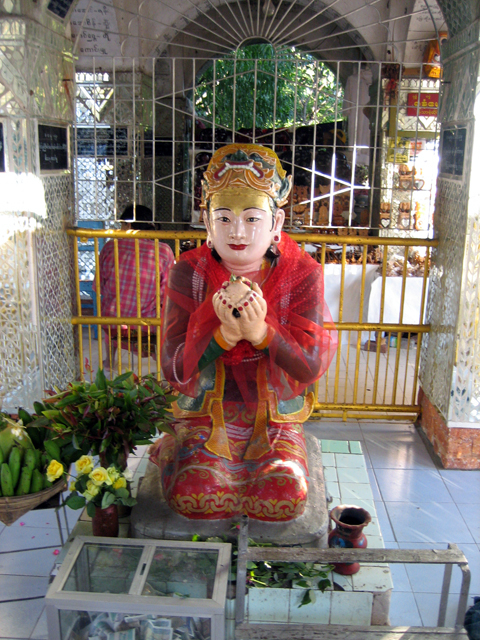
The ogress Sanda Muhki represented at Mandalay Hill

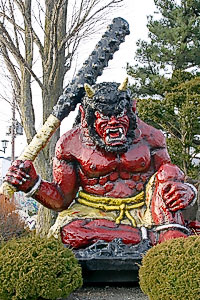
A Japanese oni

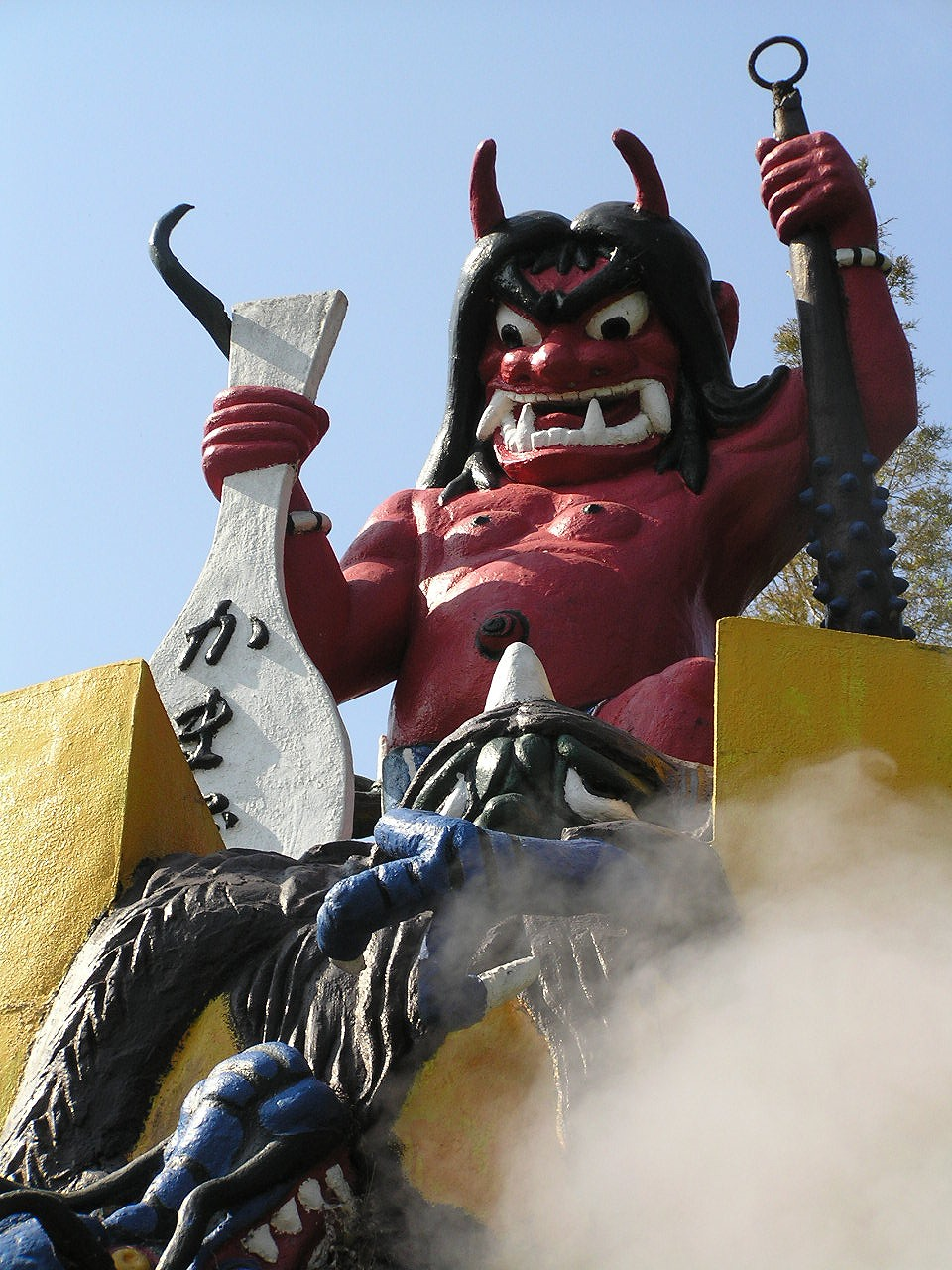
An oni in Beppu, Kyushu

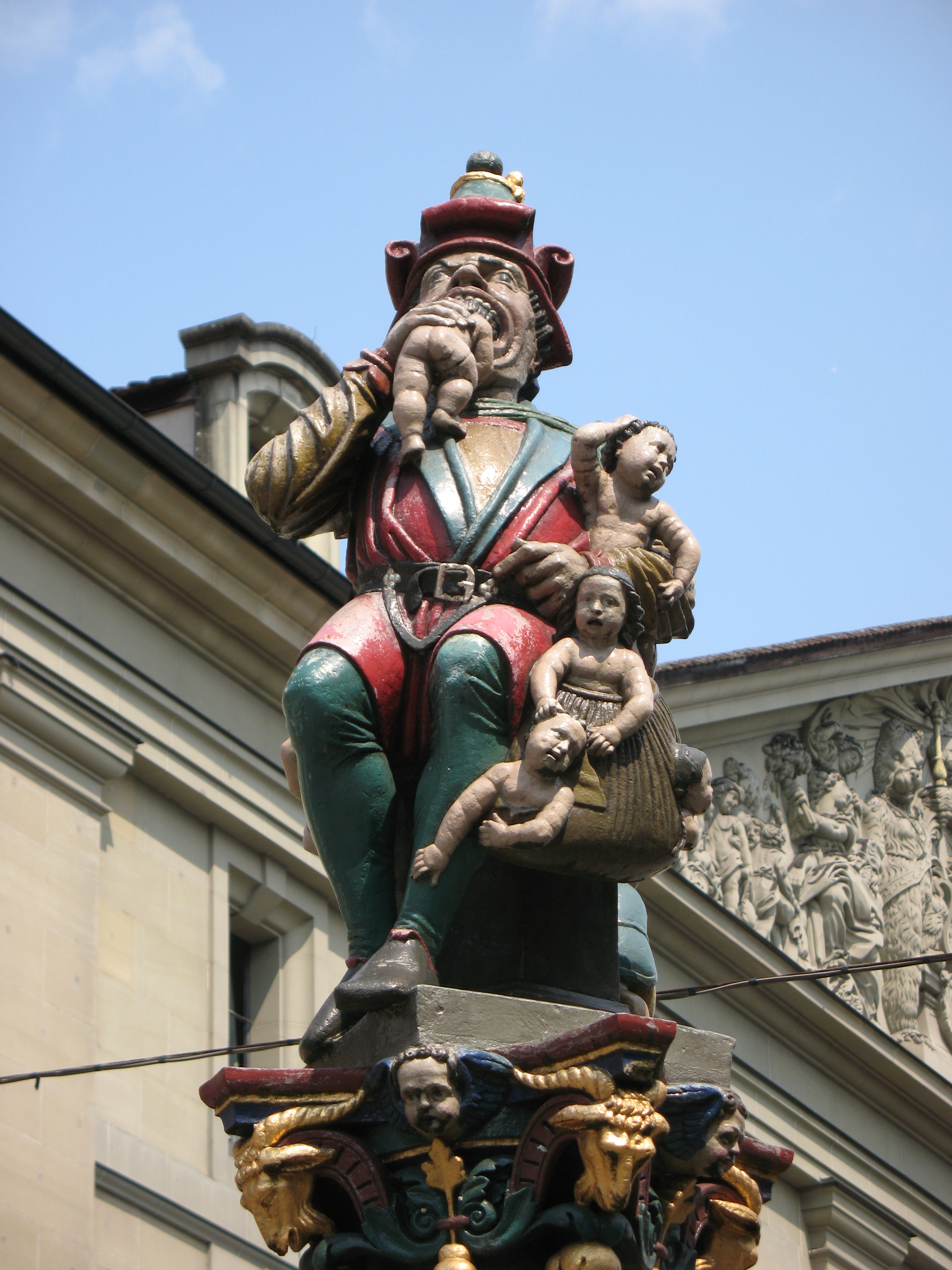
Ogre Fountain (lit. "Child Eater Fountain") at Corn House Square, Bern, Switzerland

== See also ==
- Buggane
- Child cannibalism
- Darkspawn
- Daeva
- Category:Fictional ogres
- Giant
- Goliath
- Jinn
- Ke'let
- Mapinguari
- Oni
- Orc
- Rakshasa
- Stallo
- Troll
- Wendigo
