= Roccascalegna =

- Comune
- Comune di Roccascalegna
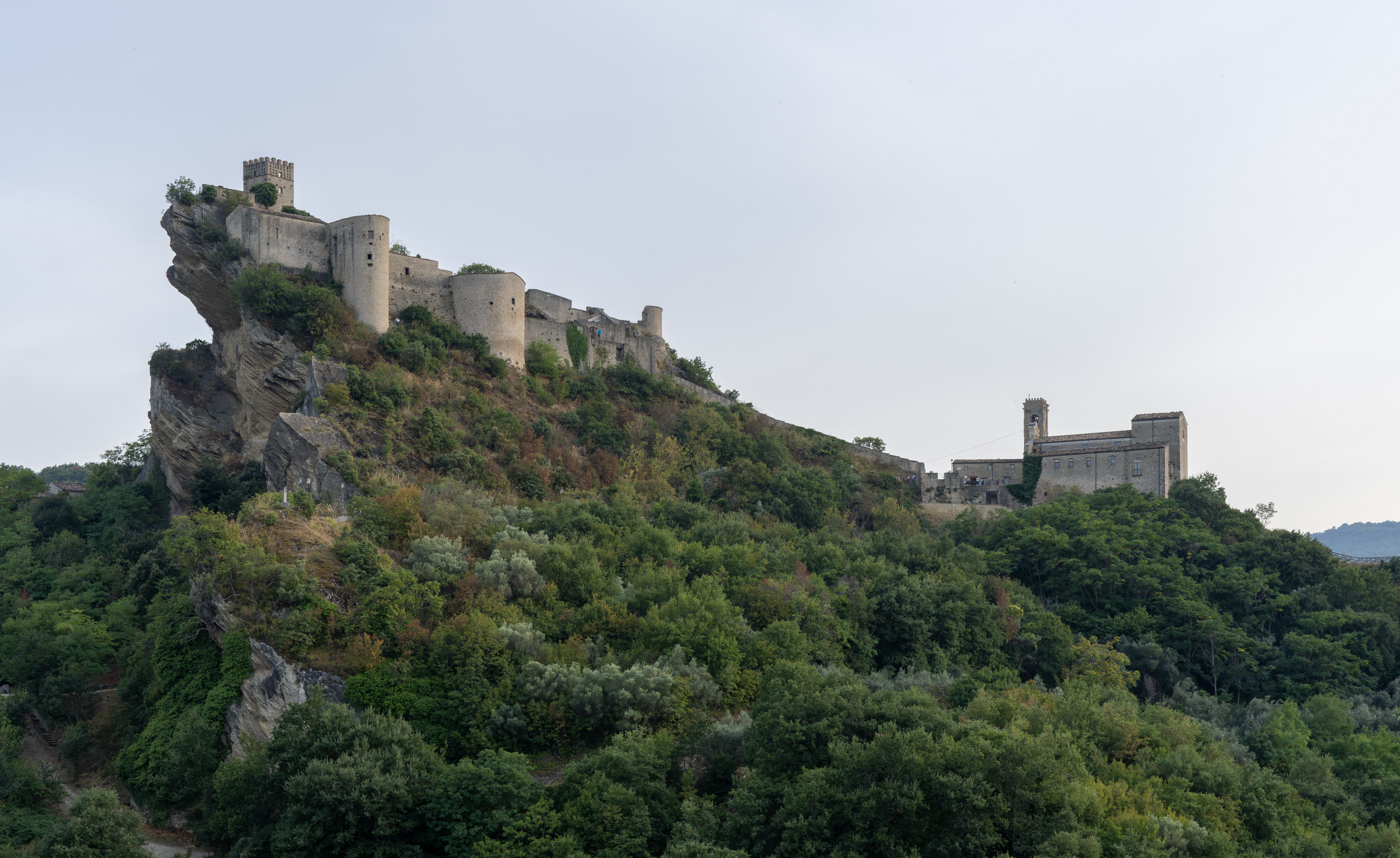
- Castle of Roccascalegna.

- Location within Italy Location within Abruzzo
- Coordinates: 42.0625°N 14.3050°E
- Country: Italy
- Region: Abruzzo
- Province: Chieti (CH)
- Frazioni: Agoniera, Aia di Rocco, Articciaro, Capriglia, Collebuono, Colle Grande, Finocchieto, Fontacciaro, Pagliari Gentili, Solagne

Government
  - Mayor: Domenico Giangiordano

Area
  - Total: 23.01 km^{2} (8.88 sq mi)
- Elevation: 430 m (1,410 ft)

Population (31 March 2017)
  - Total: 1,177
  - Density: 51.15/km^{2} (132.5/sq mi)
- Demonym: Roccolani
- Time zone: UTC+1 (CET)
  - Summer (DST): UTC+2 (CEST)
- Postal code: 66040
- Dialing code: 9872
- ISTAT code: 069075
- Patron saint: Sts. Cosmas and Damian
- Saint day: 27 September
- Website: Official website

Roccascalegna is a comune and town in the province of Chieti, part of the Abruzzo region of Italy.

== Main sights ==
- Medieval village
- Castle of Roccascalegna
- Church of San Pietro.
- Abbey of San Pancrazio, opened in 1205

== Sources ==
- Di Loreto, A. (1999). Il Castello di Roccascalegna, storia e restauro. Teramo.
- "Roccascalegna". Borghi e paesi d'Abruzzo. Vol. 11. Pescara: Carsa Edizioni. 2008. pp. 9–20. SBN IT\ICCU\TER\0031821.

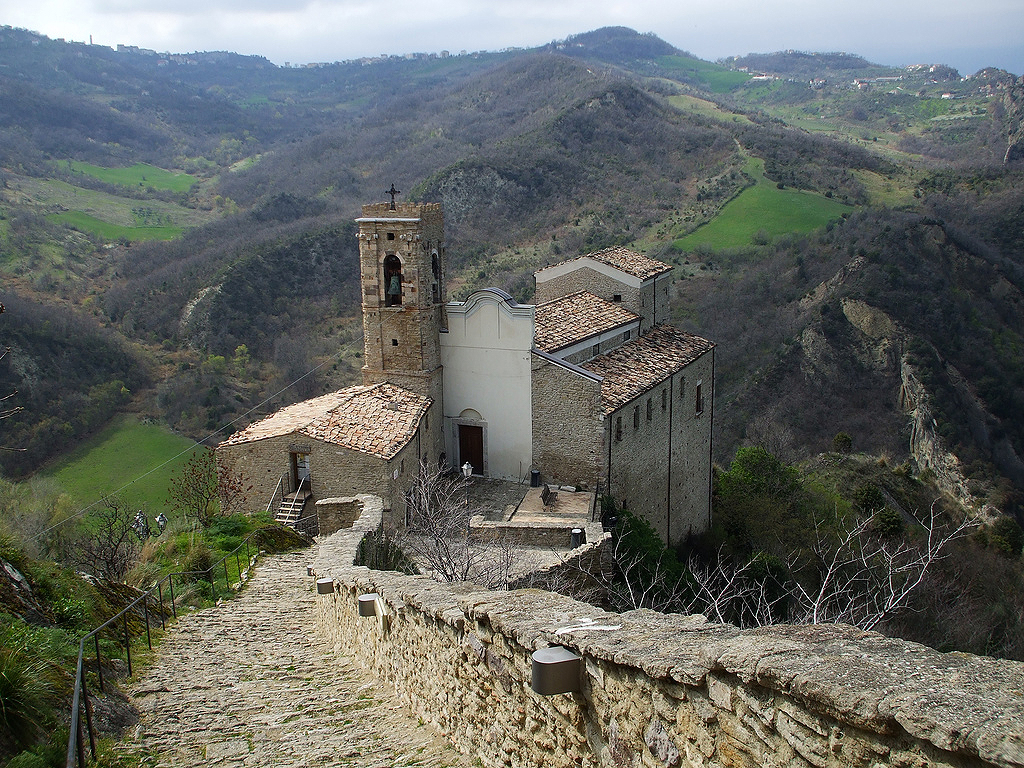
Church of San Pietro
