= The Three Aunts =

Norwegian fairy tale

Folk tale
- Name: The Three Aunts
- Aarne–Thompson grouping: ATU 501 (The Three Old Spinning Women)
- Country: Norway
- Published in: Norske Folkeeventyr

"The Three Aunts" is a Norwegian fairy tale collected by Peter Christen Asbjørnsen and Jørgen Moe in Norske Folkeeventyr.

== Synopsis ==
A poor hunter loses his wife, and their pretty daughter decides to go seek her fortune as a servant. She gets a position with the queen, and works so hard that she becomes her favorite. The other maids, jealous, tell the queen that the girl claims to be able to spin a pound of flax in twenty-four hours. The queen sets her to do it. The girl begs a room for herself, but never having spun flax, despairs. Suddenly an old woman enters, gets the girl to tell her story, and on the promise that the girl will call her "Aunt" on her wedding day, finishes the spinning for her.

The queen is pleased with the yarn, and the other maids become more jealous. They tell the queen the girl claims to be able to weave all the yarn into cloth in twenty-four hours, and the queen sets her to the task again. Another old woman comes to the girl's aid, for the same price. Then maids, still envious, now hold the girl can sew all the fabric into shirts in twenty-four hours, and a third old woman comes to help her for the same price.

Pleased with all the handicraft, the queen offers her son's hand in marriage to the girl. At the wedding reception, the three old women arrive. They are old and tired, but the girl greets each as her "aunt". The prince wonders how his beautiful bride can have such ugly relatives, and the "aunts" explain that it is the strain of long lives of constant handiwork: the spinner has an extremely long nose, the weaver has a massively broad behind and the sewer has enormous watery eyes. The prince then decrees that his bride will not spin, weave, or sew a day more in her life.

== See also ==
- Boots and the Troll
- Dapplegrim
- Habetrot and Scantlie Mab
- Rumpelstiltskin
- The Little Girl Sold with the Pears
- The Three Spinners
- Thirteenth
