= Castello di Roccascalegna =

Castle in Roccascalegna, Italy

Coordinates: 42.0625°N 14.3047°E

Castle of Roccascalegna
- Castello di Roccascalegna
- Roccascalegna
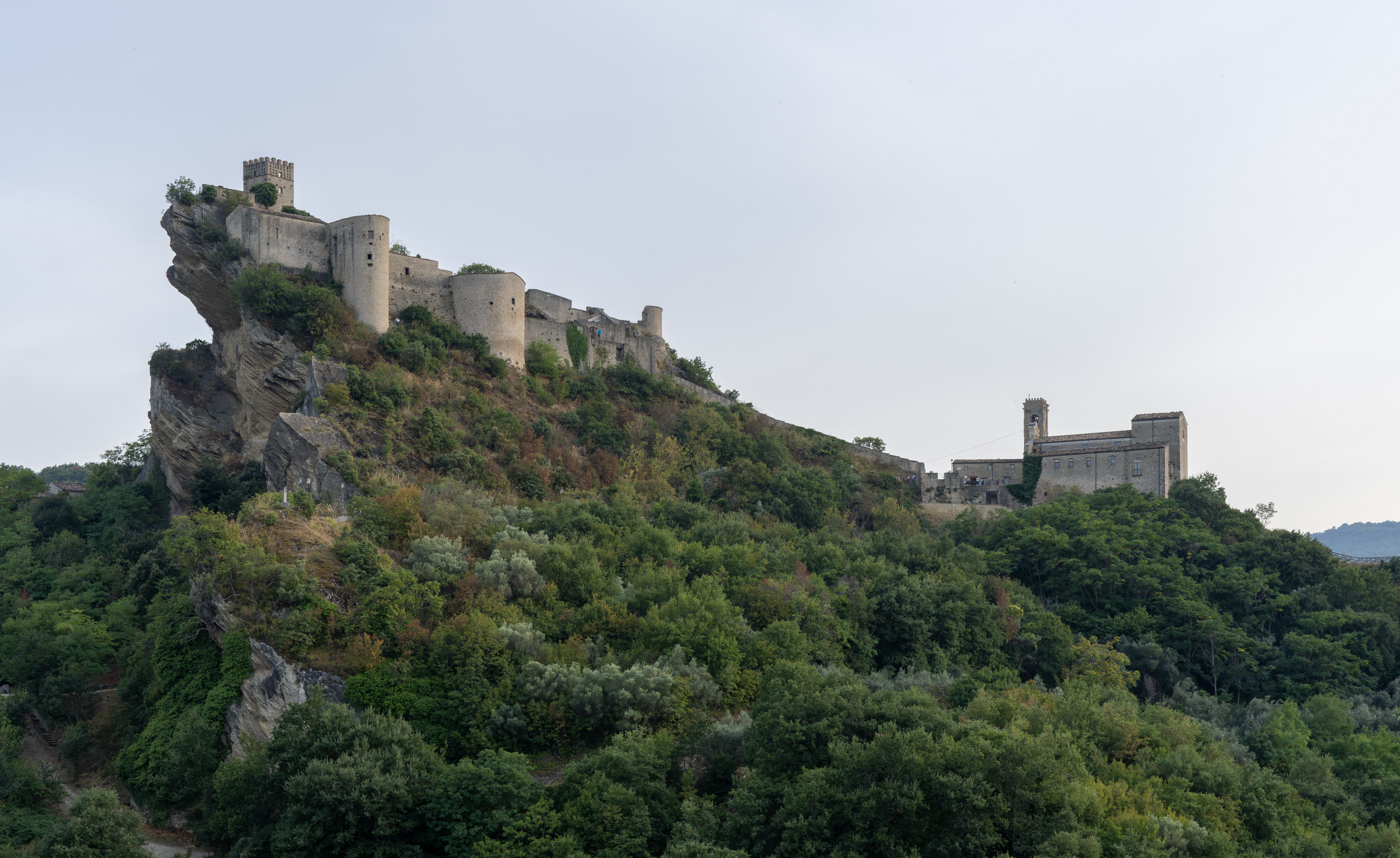
- Castle in Roccascalegna

Site information
- Type: Castle

Location

Site history
- Built: 12th century

Castello di Roccascalegna (Italian for Castle of Roccascalegna) is a medieval castle in Roccascalegna, Province of Chieti, Abruzzo, southern Italy.

== History ==
The castle was principally constructed in the 15th and 16th centuries, at a time of military rivalry between the Angevin and Aragonese armies.

== Architecture ==
A steep flight of steps leads from the plain of San Pietro to the entrance where there are the remains of the drawbridge. On the right there is a tower called Tower of Sentinel. The courtyard leads to other towers: the prison tower and the Angevin tower and the chapel with a gutter to collect rain water that flows into a tank. A further ramp leads to the watchtower built with both stone masonry and brick with openings on all four sides. The walls of the castle surround the overhanging rocky mountainous site of the Castle. The castle was featured as a principal location in the film Tale of Tales.
