= Violet (fairy tale) =

Italian fairy tale

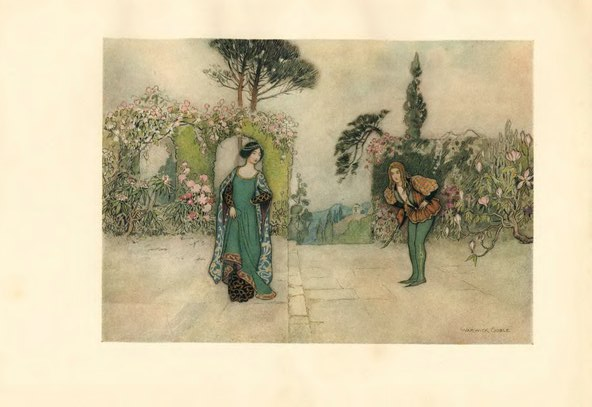

"Violet" is an Italian fairy tale by Giambattista Basile. It appears in the Pentamerone (The Tales of Tales), first published in the 1630s.

== Plot ==
A man has three daughters, the smartest and the most beautiful is named Violet. The son of the king falls in love with her. She ignores the prince's advances, claiming that she knows more than him.

Her sisters are angered by her disrespect of the prince and get Violet sent away to live with a relative. The prince finds her and tries to kiss her, but she escapes.

Her sisters, still angry with her, trap her in an ogre's garden. Instead of killing her, the ogre grows fond of her and hosts her at his house. The prince visits the ogre's house during the night and pinches her in her sleep, making her think there are fleas in her bed.

The prince mocks her for being fooled by the trick. She retaliates by stomping belled shoes while he is sleeping to frighten him. She reveals the trick and the prince admits that she is smarter than he is and asks her to marry him.
