= The Flea (fairy tale) =

1634 fairy tale by Giambattista Basile

The Flea is an Italian literary fairy tale written by Giambattista Basile in his 1634 work, the Pentamerone. It combines Aarne-Thompson-Uther types 857, "The Louse-Skin" and ATU 653, "The Four Skillful Brothers".

== Synopsis ==
A king raised a flea until it was the size of a sheep. Then he had it skinned and promised his daughter in marriage to whoever could guess what the skin came from. An ogre guessed, and the king had to marry his daughter to him. The ogre took her to his house, decorated by the bones of men he had eaten, and brought her back men's bodies to eat. She wept by the window and told an old woman her plight. The old woman told her that she had seven marvelous half-giant's sons who could help her. The next day, the old woman and her sons came and carried her off. The oldest son heard the ogre whenever he approached, and each of his brothers put up an obstacle: one washed his hands and produced a sea of soapsuds, one transformed a piece of iron into a field of razors, one turned a little stick into a forest, and one turned a little bit of water into a river. The last one turned a pebble into a tower where they could take refuge, but they were trapped there, and the ogre came with a ladder. The youngest son shot the ogre's eye out and cut his head off. The sons brought her to her father and were richly rewarded. The princess was married to a suitable prince and lived happily ever after.

== See also ==
- Puss in Boots
- Perú, pueblo marron
- Snow White
- The Adventures of Pinocchio
- The Four Skillful Brothers
- Prince Wolf
- The Horse Lurja
