= The Four Skillful Brothers =

German fairy tale

Folk tale
- Name: The Four Skillful Brothers
- Also known as: Die vier kunstreichen Brüder
- Aarne–Thompson grouping: ATU 653
- Country: Germany
- Published in: Grimm's Fairy Tales

"The Four Skillful Brothers" (German: Die vier kunstreichen Brüder) is a German fairy tale collected by the Brothers Grimm (KHM 129). It is Aarne-Thompson type 653.

== Origin ==
The Brothers Grimm published this tale in the second edition of Kinder- und Hausmärchen in 1819. Their source was the von Haxthausen family.

== Synopsis ==
A poor old father sent his sons out to learn trades. Each one met a man and was persuaded to learn the trade of the man whom he had met. In this manner, the oldest son became a thief, the second an astronomer, the third a huntsman, the fourth a tailor. When they returned, their father put them to the test. He asked his second son how many eggs there were in a nest, high on the tree, and the second son used his telescope to tell him five. Next, the eldest son climbed the tree and stole the eggs without the birds even being aware, and the third son shot all five eggs with one shot. The fourth son sewed both the shattered eggs and the chicks inside them back together, so that when the eldest put the eggs back in the nest, again without the mother bird noticing, they hatched with the only sign being some red thread about their necks.

Not long after, the king's daughter was kidnapped by a dragon. The brothers set out to rescue her. The astronomer used his telescope to find her, and asked for a ship to reach where she was held captive. The huntsman at first did not dare shoot the dragon, for fear of harming the princess as well. The thief instead stole her away, and they all set out to return to the king. The dragon followed, and this time the huntsman killed him - but when the dragon fell into the ocean, the resulting wave swamped the boat and smashed it to pieces. Finally, the tailor saved them all by sewing the boat back together.

The king did not know which man to give his daughter to, because each one had played an essential part in the rescue. He instead gave them a quarter of the kingdom each, and they agreed that that was better than their quarreling.

== Analysis ==
=== Distribution ===
On a more global scale, Daniel J. Crowley, comparing tale indexes of Indonesia, Africa, Madagascar, British Islands, France, Spain and the Muslim Near East, concluded that the tale type appears "among the most popular and widespread tales on earth".

According to Jack Zipes, the tale type is popular in both Europe (particularly in Italy) and in the Orient.

=== Origins ===
Folklorist Stith Thompson proposed that the Indian literary work Ocean of Story held "the probable original" of the European folktale.

A Hindu collection known as the Vetalapanchauinsati (“Twenty-five Tales of a Demon”) has a story in which three young men with extraordinary powers compete to marry a princess.

=== Variants ===
The oldest European version appears in the medieval collection of short stories Novellino.

French author and conteuse Henriette-Julie de Murat wrote a literary version of the tale type, named Le Père et ses quatre fils ("The Father and His Four Sons").

A Czech (Moravian) variant, The Four Brothers, was translated by A. H. Wratislaw. Wratislaw himself wrote that the Czech tale "[bore] an advantageous comparison with Grimm’s tale of the ‘Four Accomplished Brothers".

Yolando Pino-Saavedra included a variant, "The Five Brothers," in Folktales of Chile.

Italian author Giambattista Basile wrote a literary version, The Five Sons.

== In popular culture ==
- The Four Skillful Brothers was featured in Grimm's Fairy Tale Classics. In this version, the oldest brother is named Franz, the second oldest brother is named Wilhelm, the third oldest brother is named George, and the youngest brother is named Peter.
- A Hungarian variant of the tale was adapted into an episode of the Hungarian television series Magyar népmesék ("Hungarian Folk Tales") (hu), with the title A csillagász, a lopó, a vadász meg a szabó ("The Astronomer, the Thief, the Huntsman and the Tailor").
- The English Fairy Tales channel on YouTube did an adaptation.
- Felix Hoffman adapted the story into a book, The Four Clever Brothers.

== See also ==
- The Flea
- The Five Chinese Brothers
