= The Three Spinners =

German fairy tale

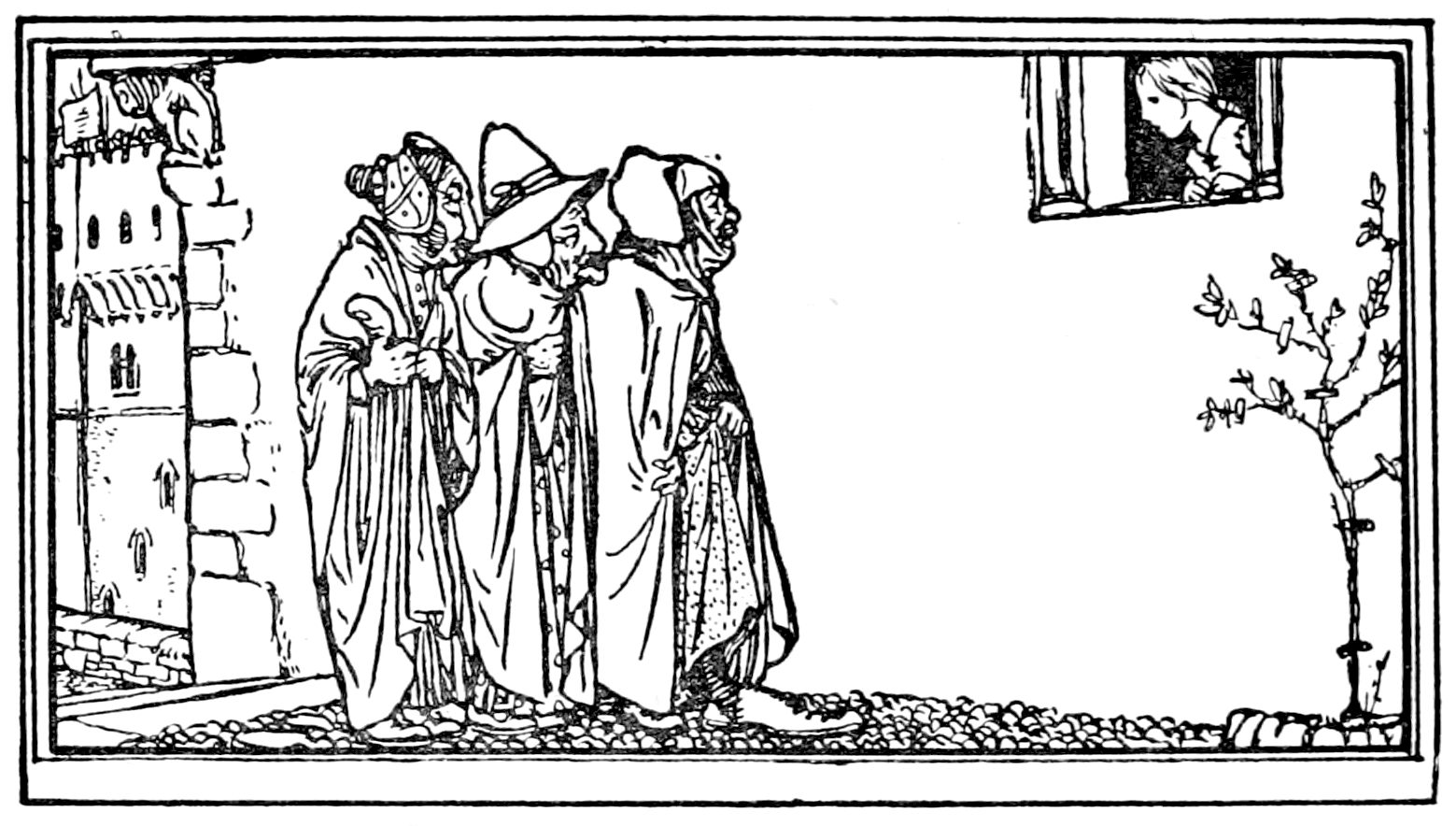
- 1912 illustration by Robert Anning Bell

Folk tale
- Name: The Three Spinners
- Also known as: The Seven Little Pork Rinds; The Three Spinning Women
- Aarne–Thompson grouping: ATU 501 (The Three Old Women Helper); ATU 501 (The Three Old Spinning Women)
- Country: Germany; Italy
- Published in: Grimm's Fairy Tales; Italian Folktales

"The Three Spinners" (also "The Three Spinning Women"; German: Die drei Spinnerinnen) is a German fairy tale collected by the Brothers Grimm in Grimm's Fairy Tales (KHM 14). It is Aarne–Thompson type 501, which is widespread throughout Europe.

It has obvious parallels to Rumpelstiltskin and Frau Holle, and obvious differences, so that they are often compared.

Giambattista Basile includes an Italian literary fairy tale, "The Seven Little Pork Rinds", in his 1634 work, the Pentamerone.

Italo Calvino's Italian Folktales includes a variant, And Seven!.

The first edition of Grimm's Fairy Tales contained a much shorter variant, "Hateful Flax Spinning", but it is "The Three Spinners" that became well known.

== Origin ==
The tale was published by the Brothers Grimm in the second edition of Kinder- und Hausmärchen in 1819. Their principal source was Paul Wigand (1786–1866), completed by the versions of Jeanette Hassenpflug (1791–1860) and Johannes Prätorius (1630–1680). The first edition (1812) contained a shorter variant titled "Hateful Flax Spinning" (Von dem bösen Flachsspinnen), based on Jeanette Hassenpflug's account.

== Synopsis ==
Once there was a beautiful-but-lazy girl who refused to spin. While her mother is beating her for her laziness, the Queen, happening to pass by, witnesses her punishment and asks the reason for it. Ashamed to admit her daughters laziness, the woman replies that her daughter spins so much that she cannot afford to buy enough flax to keep her occupied. The Queen, impressed by such industry, offers to take the girl with her.

Once at the castle, the queen takes the girl to a room filled with flax. If she spins it all within three days, she will be married to the queen's oldest son. Two days later, the queen returns and is amazed to find the flax untouched. The girl explains that homesickness has kept her from spinning, but she realizes that excuse will not serve her twice.

Three women appear in the room that night. One has a grotesquely swollen foot; the second, an overgrown thumb; the third, a pendulous lip. They offer to spin all the flax for the girl if she will invite them to her wedding, introduce them as her aunts, and seat them at the high table. She agrees, and they commence and complete the spinning.

In the morning, the queen is satisfied to see the flax all spun. She arranges for the wedding to her son, the prince, and the girl asks to invite her "aunts". When they appear, the prince asks how they came to have such deformities, and the three explain that they come from their years of spinning-the foot from treading, the lip from licking, and the thumb from twisting thread. The prince forbids his beautiful new wife to spin again.

=== Variant: Hateful Flax Spinning ===
A king orders his queen and daughters to spin all the time. One day, he gives them a great box of flax to spin, to his daughters' distress. The queen invites three hideous old maids to come to the castle and spin. The king sees them and asks the cause of their deformities. Their answer: from spinning. The king forbids his wife and daughters to spin again.

== Italian variants ==
=== The Seven Little Pork Rinds ===
A girl eats seven pieces of bacon, leaving none for her mother. While the mother beats her for her gluttony, a passing merchant asks the reason, and the woman replies that her daughter is ruining her health by working too hard. The merchant decides on the spot to marry this industrious girl.

The now-married merchant goes on a journey, leaving his wife the spinning. Making an effort to spin, she flicks a passersby with water; some passing fairies are so amused by this that they offer to do the spinning for her. Despite their aid, the merchant's wife claims that the spinning has made her ill, and the merchant decides not to require her to spin any more, as her mother must have been right about her overworking.

=== And Seven! ===
In this version, as in the one just described, the part of the king is taken by a merchant; similarly, the mother berates her daughter for "seven" – meaning seven bowls of soup that the girl has eaten – but the mother pretends that they are spindles of hemp that the girl has spun.

The women helpers in this version – who also are deformed from their years of spinning – instruct the girl to invite them to her wedding by calling their names. If she does not do so, they warn her, she will be worse off than she would have been had they not spun for her. She forgets the names and puts off the wedding while she tries to recall them. The merchant sees the three women cavorting in the forest and hears them call out their names, similar to the scene in Rumpelstiltskin; he describes this to his bride in hopes of amusing her and getting her to agree to a wedding date. She is therefore able to invite her helpers and bring about the happy ending as in "The Three Spinners".

== International variants ==
=== British Isles ===
Folklorist Joseph Jacobs, in More English Fairy Tales, compared the English tale Habetrot and Scantlie Mab with the German tale. Professor Ernest Warren Baughman, in his work Type and Motif-index of the Folktales of England and North America, listed the origin of Lang's variant as Orkney Islands, along with versions from Selkirk and England.

A Scottish variant of Whuppity Stoorie is very similar to this tale: the wife of a gentleman or a rich man finds six little women clad in green, who agree to do her household chores with the condition she invites them for dinner.

=== Ireland ===
An Irish variant, entitled The Lazy Beauty and her Aunts, was published in The fireside stories of Ireland, and translated into French by Loys Brueyre, with the name La Paresseuse et ses Tantes. Irish folklorist Patrick Kennedy, on his notations about this variant from Ireland, mentioned the great similarity of the Irish version to the Italian one (The Seven Slices of Bacon) and the Norse one (The Three Aunts).

=== Iberian Peninsula ===
A Spanish variant was collected by Fernán Caballero with the name Las ánimas ("The souls"), and translated into English as The Souls in Purgatory.

Writer Elsie Spicer Eells translated a Spanish variant with the title The Luck Fairies, where the fairies see the shoddy work of the lazy beauty and take it upon themselves to spin and weave with perfection.

Variants in Portuguese language have been attested in compilations: As Tias ("The Aunts"), by Consiglieri Pedroso in Portuguese Folk-Tales; As fiandeiras, collected by Theophilo Braga; A devota das almas, collected by Brazilian folklorist Câmara Cascudo.

=== Western Europe ===
A variant from Normandy has been attested with the name La Fileuse or La Fileresse.

A Flemish version of the tale exists with the name Het huwelijk van Gilda met de gouden haarlokken ("Le mariage de Gilda aux cheveux d'or").

=== Northern Europe ===
A Swedish tale can be found in Gunnar Cavallius and George Stephens's Schwedische Volkssagen und Märchen, with the name Das Mädchen, das Gold aus Lehm und Schüttenstroh spinnen konnte.

=== Central Europe ===
A Czech variant has been collected by Karel Jaromír Erben, named O trech pradlenach and translated into French (Les Trois Fileuses).

French author Edouard Laboulaye included a "Dalmatian" version named The Spinning Queen in his book Last Fairy Tales. In this variant, the three aunts are described as witches.

=== Americas ===
In a Puerto Rican variant, three Holy Souls in Purgatory replace the fairies, and a merchant takes the place of the king. The heroine in this version is an orphan abused by an aunt.

=== Literary versions ===
The story was given a literary treatment, with the name The three little Crones, each with Something big, where the lazy spinster is a princess, who is trapped in a tower by her own mother in order that she should learn how to spin flax.

== Variants without magic ==
In the Uzbek variant, called The Resourceful Spinner, the fairy spinners are absent. Instead, the wife attempts to both eat and spin at the same time, which is seen by a passing prince suffering from a bone stuck inside his throat. The sight makes him laugh so hard that the bone becomes dislodged, curing him. His father, the ruler, is so grateful that he promises to fulfill any wish of hers, and the woman asks him for enough weavers to spin the flax. Later, the wife bows to a passing beetle, and explains to the surprised husband it's actually her aunt, shriveled from the effort of weaving, to which his husband forbids her to ever weave again. A related Armenian tale has the wife lose the flax but find a gold nugget, which she claims to her husband was given to her for the quality work. Her mother later likewise claims a black beetle is her aunt, and the husband likewise forbids his wife to ever work again.

Two versions collected from England 'The Gypsy Woman' from Suffolk (The Watkins Book of English Folktales by Neil Philip pp. 103–105) and 'Duffy and the Devil' from Cornwall (Bottrell Traditions and Hearthside Stories of West Cornwall, Vol. 2, by William Bottrell, 1873 pp. 11–26) both conclude without the use of magic, instead plain trickery involving grease, rotten eggs, or alcohol is used. In both these versions there is only one female saviour, not three.

== See also ==
- The Lazy Spinner
- The Three Aunts
- Rumpelstiltskin
- Mother Hulda

== Bibliography ==
- Bolte, Johannes; Polívka, Jiri. Anmerkungen zu den Kinder- u. hausmärchen der brüder Grimm. Erster Band (NR. 1-60). Germany, Leipzig: Dieterich'sche Verlagsbuchhandlung. 1913. pp. 109–115.
- Brueyre, Loys. Contes populaires de la Grande-Bretagne. Paris: Libraire Hachette et C. 1875. p. 162.
- Jones, W. Henry; Kropf, Lajos L.; Kriza, János. The folk-tales of the Magyars. London: Pub. for the Folk-lore society by E. Stock. 1889. pp. 330–334.
- von Sydow, C. W. Två spinnsagor: en studie i jämförande folksagoforskning (Monograph). Akademisk avhandling—Lund. Stockholm : P.A. Norstedt. 1909. [Analysis of Aarne-Thompson-Uther tale types 500 and 501]
