= Adriana Basile =

Italian composer and singer (1586–1642)

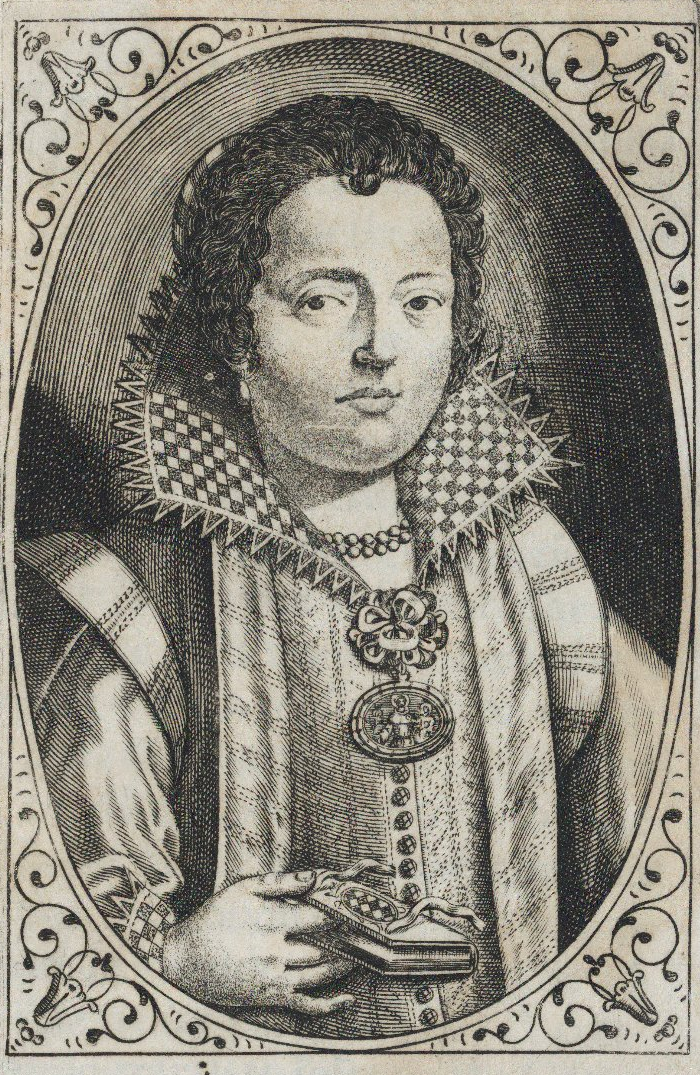
- Basile in a 1628 engraving
- Born: c. 1586; Posillipo
- Died: c. 1642; Naples
- Occupations: Composer; singer

Adriana Basile (baptized 21 December 1586 – after c. 1642) was an Italian composer, musician, poet, and singer of the Baroque period.

== Life ==
She was born and died in Naples. From 1610, she worked for the Gonzagas in Mantua. Members of her family also worked for the court, including her brothers, Giambattista Basile, a poet, Lelio Basile, a composer, and her sisters, Margherita and Vittoria, who were both singers. Her husband, Mutio Baroni, and her three children, her son Camillo, and two daughters, Leonora and Caterina were also at the court. Leonora and Caterina were both successful singers in their own right. Claudio Monteverdi declared that Basile was a more talented singer than Francesca Caccini, who was at that time at the Medici court.

Duke Vincenzo Gonzaga awarded Basile a barony in the Monferrato, and she was also well regarded by Vincenzo's sons Francesco and Ferdinando. While still working for the Mantuan court, she travelled to Florence, Rome, Naples, and Modena. She performed in Alessandro Guarini's Licori, ovvero L’incanto d’amore. In 1626 she retired from the service of the Gonzagas, and moved to Naples and later Rome.

None of Basile's music survives, but she is known to have improvised on poetry, including in a competition with Caccini in November 1623. It was reported that Adriana's repertory comprised over 300 songs in Italian and Spanish, which she sang from memory, accompanying herself on the harp or guitar. A number of composers have left musical tributes in her honour, while a collection of poetic tributes, "Il teatro delle glorie", was first published in Venice in 1623 and then, in expanded form, in Naples in 1628.

It has been proposed that a painting by Antiveduto Gramatica of Santa Cecilia with two musical angels depicts Adriana's harp. The harp is decorated with the coat of arms and imprese of the Gonzaga family, and Adriana's own coat of arms.
