= Giambattista Basile =

Italian fairy tale collector (1566–1632)

- Joannes Baptista
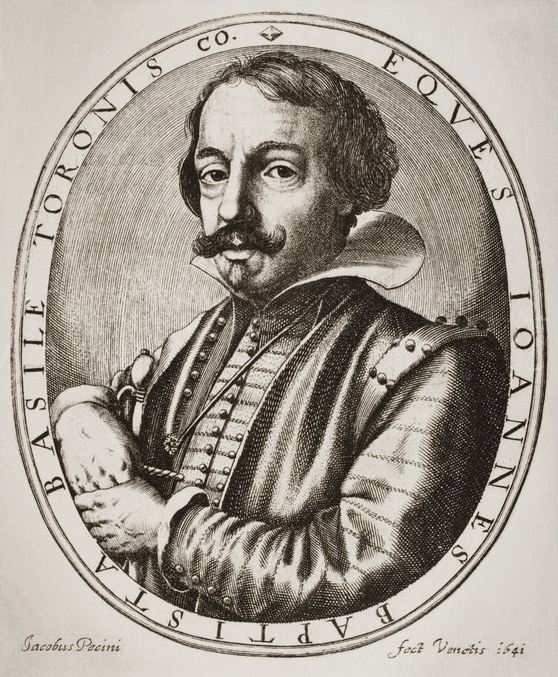
- Born: 15 February 1566; Giugliano in Campania, Kingdom of Naples (present-day Italy)
- Died: 23 February 1632 (aged 66); Giugliano in Campania, Kingdom of Naples (present-day Italy)
- Occupations: Poet; writer; courtier
- Writing career
- Pen name: Gian Alesio Abbatutis
- Language: Italian; Neapolitan
- Notable work: Lo Cunto de li Cunti

Giambattista Basile (15 February 1566 (date of baptism) – 23 February 1632) was an Italian poet, courtier, and fairy tale collector. His collections include the oldest recorded forms of many well-known (and more obscure) European fairy tales. He is chiefly remembered for writing the collection of Neapolitan fairy tales known as Il Pentamerone.

Born in Naples into a middle-class family, Basile was a soldier and courtier to various Italian princes, including the doge of Venice. In Venice he began to write poetry. Later he returned to Naples to serve as a courtier under the patronage of Don Marino II Caracciolo, prince of Avellino, to whom he dedicated his idyll L'Aretusa (1618). By the time of his death he had reached the rank of "Count" Conte di Torone.

Basile's earliest known literary production is from 1604 in the form of a preface to the Vaiasseide written by his Neapolitan friend Giulio Cesare Cortese. The following year his villanella Smorza crudel amore was set to music and in 1608 he published his poem Il Pianto della Vergine.

He is chiefly remembered for writing the collection of Neapolitan fairy tales titled Lo cunto de li cunti overo lo trattenemiento de peccerille (Neapolitan for "The Tale of Tales, or Entertainment for Little Ones"), also known as Il Pentamerone published posthumously in two volumes by his sister Adriana in Naples, Italy in 1634 and 1636 under the pseudonym Gian Alesio Abbatutis. It later became known as the Pentamerone. Tales of Pentamerone are set in the woods and castles of the Basilicata, in particular the city of Acerenza. Although neglected for some time, the work received a great deal of attention after the Brothers Grimm praised it highly as the first national collection of fairy tales. Basile was the first author to use the figure of the ogre in fairy tales. Many of the Pentamerone fairy tales are the oldest known variants in existence, notably the earliest European versions of Rapunzel, Cinderella and Sleeping Beauty.

== In popular culture ==
The 2015 film Tale of Tales is a screen adaptation loosely based on his fairy tale collection.

== See also ==
- Charles Perrault
- Giovanni Francesco Straparola
- Brothers Grimm
