= At the Pike's Behest =

Russian fairy tale collected by Alexander Afanasyev

At the Pike's Behest!
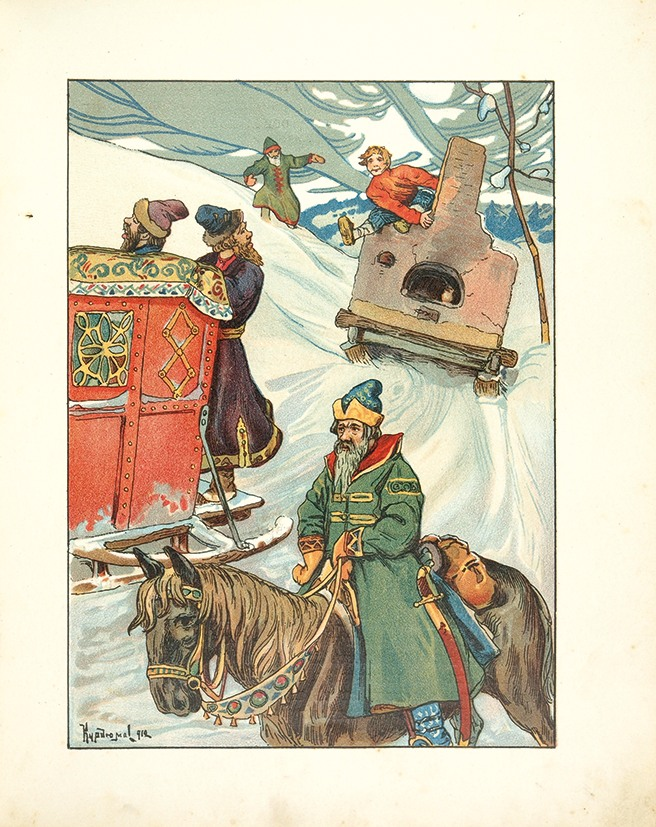
- Emelian rides on the horseless sled. Illustration by Valery Kurdyumov, 1913.

Folk tale
- Name: At the Pike's Behest!
- Also known as: Emelian, the Fool; Emelya the Simpleton
- Aarne–Thompson grouping: ATU 675 (The Lazy Boy)
- Region: Russia
- Published in: Narodnye russkie skazki by Alexander Afanasyev
- Related: Peruonto; The Dolphin; Half-Man; Foolish Hans (de); Peter the Fool (fr)

Emelya the Simpleton (Russian: Емеля-дурак) or At the Pike's Behest (Russian: По щучьему веленью) is a Russian folktale (skazka). Alexander Afanasyev included the story in his collection Narodnye russkie skazki, published in the mid-19th century.

== Synopsis ==
Emelya lived in a village on the bank of the Volga River with his two brothers and their wives. Although he was good-looking, he was also foolish, lazy, and despised work. He spent his days sitting on the clay stove in the kitchen. His brothers ran a trading business left to them by their late father. The brothers left Emelya one day, to sell their wares along the river, leaving Emelya with the wives, promising to return with a kaftan, red boots, and a red hat for their brother.

During the days and weeks the brothers were gone, the wives tried unsuccessfully to get Emelya to do work, until one day, they left Emelya with a choice: get water from the frozen river, or no dinner and no kaftan, red boots and red hat. At that threat, Emelya hurried on his way, and on reaching the river, he grumbled about his problems while hacking away at the thick ice. As he scooped water into the buckets, he noticed he had caught a fish: a large pike. Emelya was going to take it home for supper, but the pike pleaded with him, promising that if Emelya were to let it go, he would never need to work again, which was a tempting offer for lazy Emelya. All he would need to say, was “By the Pike’s command, and at my desire-(command)“ and his will would be done. Emelya agreed, and to his surprise, the commands worked.

Emelya was not careful to conceal his new talent for work, and soon the tsar heard about it, and ordered this ‘magician’ to appear before him at his palace by the Caspian Sea. Emelya, being foolish and lazy, ordered his stove to take him to the tsar, using the Pike's command. He arrived instantly at the palace before the tsar, still lying on his stove, where he looked down on the tsar and was not acting the way a subject should towards his superior. The tsar would have ordered his head cut off, had he not wanted the secret to the boy's power. However, he could not extract the secret from Emelya, so he tried to use his daughter to get the secret. After three days of teaching each other games, the princess had learned only that Emelya was handsome, fun, and charming. She wanted to marry him. The tsar was at first angry, then decided that Emelya would perhaps give up his secret to his wife, if he became married. So he arranged for a wedding.

At first, Emelya was horrified at the idea, believing a wife to be more trouble than it was worth. He agreed, though, and the wedding feast was held soon after, at which Emelya finally got down from his stove. During the feast, Emelya had terrible table manners, which convinced the tsar to finally rid himself of the obnoxious boy. A sleeping potion was added to Emelya's wine, he was thrown in a barrel and tossed into the sea, and his bride banished to an island in the sea opposite the palace. While floating in the waves, Emelya encountered his friend the pike, who allowed Emilyan to wish for anything his heart desired, since he had not abused his power. Emelya wished for wisdom, and when the pike pushed him to the island, Emelya fell in love with his wife. He had the hut on the island transformed into a beautiful palace, with a crystal bridge connecting to the mainland, so that his wife could visit her father, the tsar. With his new-found wisdom, he made amends with everyone, and thereafter lived happily and ruled well.

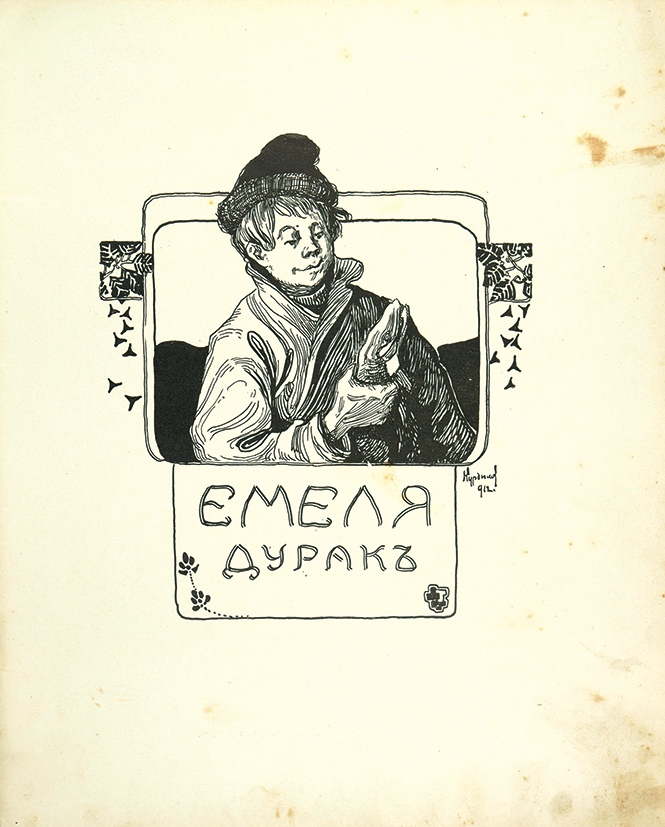
Emelya the Fool and the Magic Pike by Valery Kurdyumov, book published in 1913.

== Translations ==
The tale was translated into English as Emelyan, the Fool, Emilian the Fool, Emelya and the Pike and At the Behest of the Pike.

The tale was also translated as By the Will of the Pike, by Irina Zheleznova.

The tale can also be known as At the Wish of the Fish.

== English versions ==
The story was retold and translated into English with the title Foolish Emilyan and the Talking Fish by Lee Wyndham in "Russian Tales of Fabulous Beasts and Marvels", illustrated by Charles Mikolaycak.

The tale was also published as a standalone book titled The Fool and the Fish, with illustrations by artist Gennady Spirin.

The tale was retold as Ivan the Fool and the Magic Pike by James Riordan.

== Analysis ==
=== Tale type ===
The tale is classified - and gives its name - to the East Slavic type SUS 675, Russian: По щучьему велению, romanized: Po shchuch'yemu veleniyu, lit. 'At the Pike's Command', of the East Slavic Folktale Classification (Russian: СУС, romanized: SUS). The East Slavic type corresponds, in the international Aarne-Thompson-Uther Index, to type ATU 675, "The Lazy Boy".

19th century Portuguese folklorist Consiglieri Pedroso claimed that the tale is a popular one, specially "in the East of Europe". Its name in Russian compilations is Emilian the Fool or By the Pike's Will. Similarly, Jack Haney stated that the tale is "common throughout the Eastern Slavic world", but its first appearance in Russia was in a compilation published in 1787 by P. Timofeev.

=== Predecessors ===
The tale first appeared in a German language compilation of fairy tales, published by Anton Dietrich in 1831, in Leipzig. Its name was Märchen von Emeljan, dem Narren. Jacob Grimm, of his famed collection, noted its great resemblance with Peruonto. The similarity was also noted by mythologist Thomas Keightley, in the 19th century, in his book Tales and Popular Fictions.

=== Interpretations ===
Portuguese author José Teixeira Rêgo suggested that the story of Emiliano Parvo ("The Foolish Emelian") was "a deformed [narrative] of the flood myth". He also considered the text of Emelian the Fool as a more complete version of the story, which would allow him to formulate his hypothesis. For instance, he compared the episode of Emelyan meeting the pike in the ocean and its help to Matsya, pisciform avatara of Vishnu, being released by king Manu and, in turn, alerting the human about the upcoming great deluge and helping him reach terra firma. He also compared the crystal bridge the pike produces with his magic to a rainbow the gods send the survivors of the flood.

== Variants ==
Folklorist Alexander Afanasyev compiled two variants of the tale about the magic pike wherein the protagonist is the foolish character.

He also collected another version about the magic pike, but the protagonist is simply a humble man, instead of a stupid and lazy boy.

== Cultural legacy ==
The tale was adapted into the 1938 film Wish upon a Pike, four Soviet animated films (1938, 1957, 1970, 1984) and a Russian film from 2023.

== See also ==
- The Fisherman and His Wife (German fairy tale collected by the Brothers Grimm)
- The Tale of the Fisherman and the Fish (Alexander Pushkin's fairy tale in verse)

== Bibliography ==
- Lee Wyndham, Russian Tales of Fabulous Beasts and Marvels, “Foolish Emilyan and the Talking Fish”
- Thomas P. Whitney (transl.), In a Certain Kingdom: Twelve Russian Fairy Tales
- Moura Budberg and Amabel Williams-Ellis, Russian Fairy Tales
