= Rubber room =

Rubber room may refer to:

- Padded cells
- Reassignment center, also known as a rubber room in the New York City school system
- The Rubber Room, a 2010 documentary film about the New York City school system and reassignment centers
- "Rubber Room", the original final episode of the US television drama Law & Order
- Rubber room (bunker), emergency egress bunkers located below the launch pads at Kennedy Space Center
