= Boredom =

Emotion of uninterest in surroundings

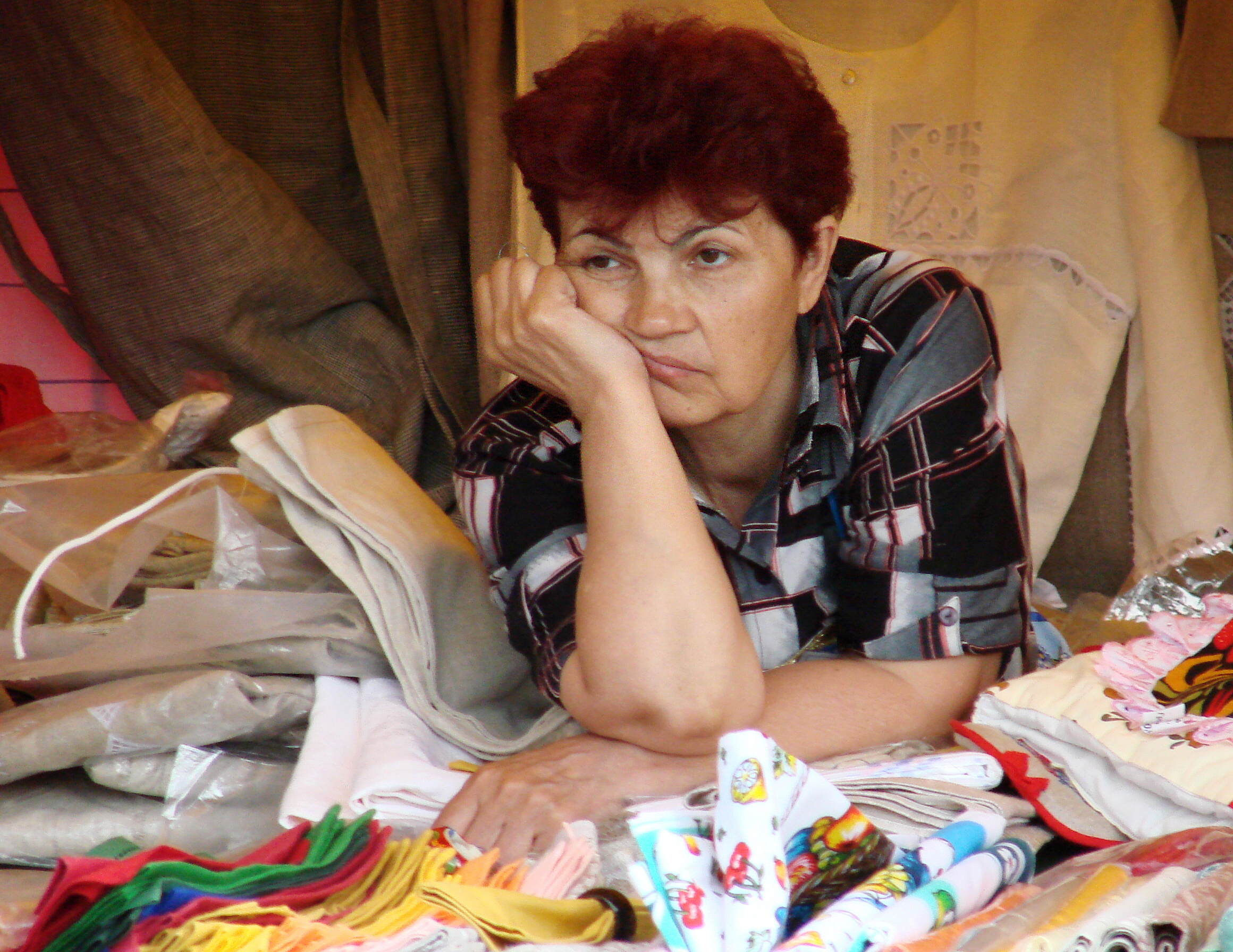
A souvenir seller in Moscow appears bored as she waits for customers.

In conventional usage, boredom, ennui, or tedium is an emotion characterized by uninterest in one's surrounding, often caused by a lack of distractions or occupations. However, boredom is not well defined. It is distinct from depression and apathy. Boredom may damage mental health, but it also seems to have improved creativity in humans.

In Experience Without Qualities: Boredom and Modernity, Elizabeth Goodstein traces the modern discourse on boredom through literary, philosophical, and sociological texts to find that as "a discursively articulated phenomenon...boredom is at once objective and subjective, emotion and intellectualization—not just a response to the modern world, but also a historically constituted strategy for coping with its discontents." In both conceptions, boredom has to do fundamentally with an experience of time—such as experiencing the slowness of time—and problems of meaning.

== Etymology and terminology ==
The expression to be a bore had been used in print in the sense of "to be tiresome or dull" since 1768 at the latest. The expression "boredom" means "state of being bored," 1852, from bore (v.1) + -dom. It also has been employed in a sense "bores as a class" (1883) and "practice of being a bore" (1864, a sense properly belonging to boreism, 1833). The word "bore" as a noun meaning a "thing which causes ennui or annoyance" is attested to since 1778; "of persons by 1812". The noun "bore" comes from the verb "bore", which had the meaning "[to] be tiresome or dull" first attested [in] 1768, a vogue word c. 1780–81 according to Grose (1785); possibly a figurative extension of "to move forward slowly and persistently, as a [hole-] boring tool does." A popular misconception is that Charles Dickens coined the term "boredom" in his work Bleak House, published in 1853. The word, however, has been attested since at least 1829 in an issue of the publication The Albion.

The French term for boredom, ennui, is sometimes used in English as well, at least since 1778. The term ennui was first used "as a French word in English;" in the 1660s and it was "nativized by 1758". The term ennui comes "from French ennui, from Old French enui "annoyance" (13c.), [a] back-formation from enoiier, anuier. "The German word for "boredom" is Langeweile, a compound made of lange "long" and Weile "while", which is in line with the common perception that when one is bored, time passes "torturously" slowly.

== Psychology ==
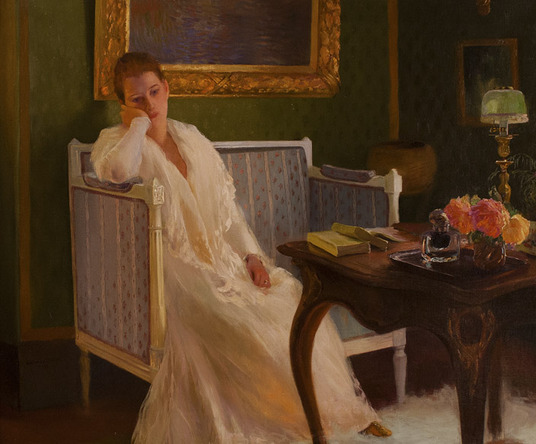
Boredom by Gaston de La Touche, 1893

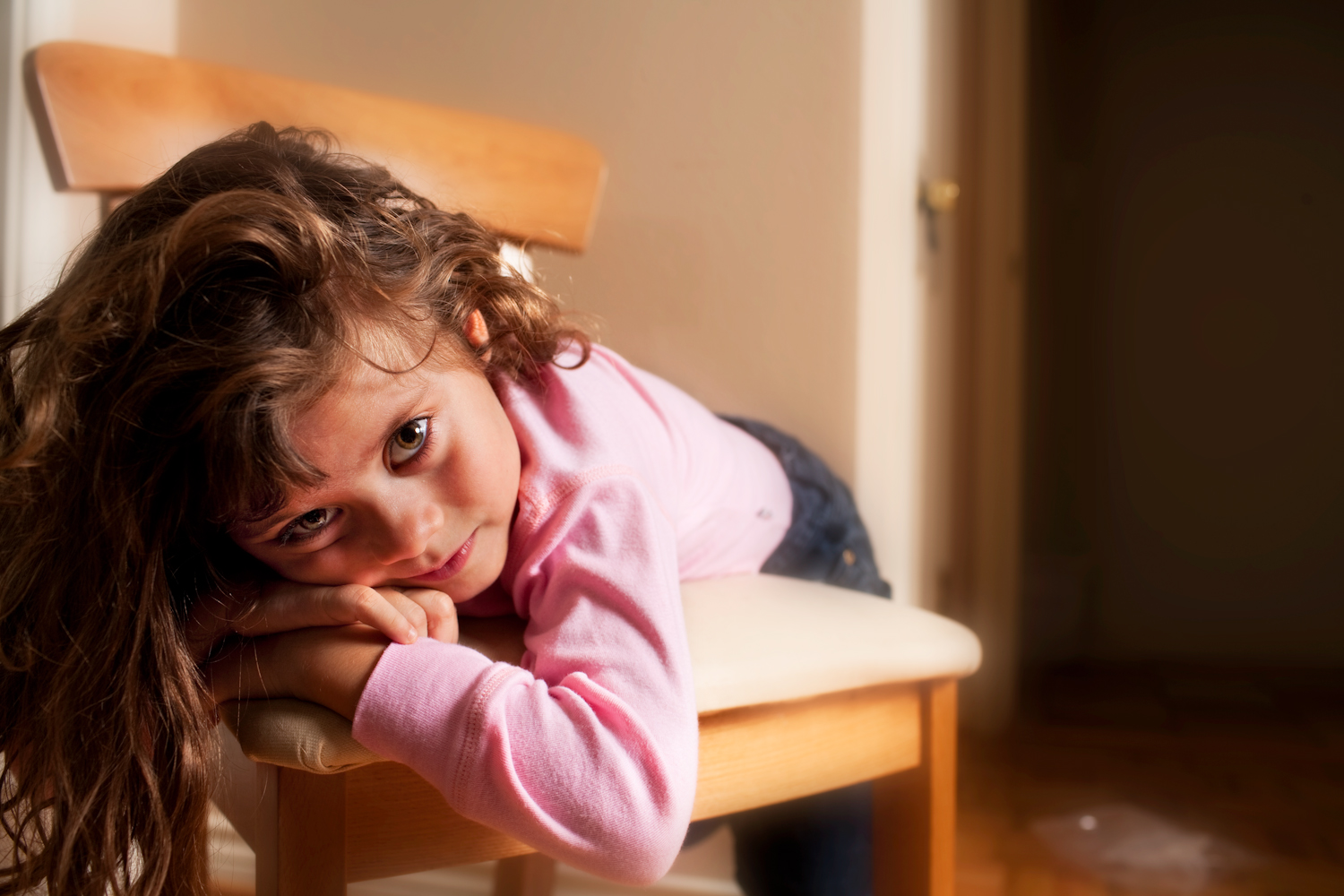
A girl looking bored

Different scholars use different definitions of boredom, which complicates research. Boredom has been defined by Cynthia D. Fisher in terms of its main central psychological processes: "an unpleasant, transient affective state in which the individual feels a pervasive lack of interest and difficulty concentrating on the current activity." Mark Leary et al. describe boredom as "an affective experience associated with cognitive attentional processes." Robert Plutchik characterized boredom as a mild form of disgust. In positive psychology, boredom is described as a response to a moderate challenge for which the subject has more than enough skill.

There are three types of boredom, all of which involve problems of engagement of attention. These include times when humans are prevented from engaging in wanted activity, when humans are forced to engage in unwanted activity, or when people are simply unable for some other reason to maintain engagement in an activity. Boredom proneness is a tendency to experience boredom of all types. This is typically assessed by the Boredom Proneness Scale. Recent research has found that boredom proneness is clearly and consistently associated with failures of attention. Boredom and its proneness are both theoretically and empirically linked to depression and similar symptoms. Nonetheless, boredom proneness has been found to be as strongly correlated with attentional lapses as with depression. Although boredom is often viewed as a trivial and mild irritant, proneness to boredom has been linked to a very diverse range of possible psychological, physical, educational, and social problems.

Absent-mindedness is where a person shows inattentive or forgetful behaviour. Absent-mindedness is a mental condition in which the subject experiences low levels of attention and frequent distraction. Absent-mindedness is not a diagnosed condition, but rather a symptom of boredom and sleepiness which people experience in their daily lives. People who are absent-minded tend to show signs of memory lapse and weak recollection of recently occurring events. This can usually be a result of a variety of other conditions often diagnosed by clinicians such as attention deficit hyperactivity disorder and depression. In addition to absent-mindedness leading to an array of consequences affecting daily life, it can also have more severe, long-term problems.

== Physical health ==
Lethargy is a state of tiredness, weariness, fatigue, or lack of energy. It can be accompanied by depression, decreased motivation, or apathy. Lethargy can be a normal response to boredom, inadequate sleep, overexertion, overworking, stress, lack of exercise, or a symptom of a disorder. When part of a normal response, lethargy often resolves with rest, adequate sleep, decreased stress, and good nutrition.

== Philosophy ==
Boredom is a condition characterized by perception of one's environment as dull, tedious, and lacking in stimulation. This can result from leisure and a lack of aesthetic interests. Labor and art may be alienated and passive, or immersed in tedium. There is an inherent anxiety in boredom; people will expend considerable effort to prevent or remedy it, yet in many circumstances, it is accepted as suffering to be endured. Common passive ways to escape boredom are to sleep or to think creative thoughts (daydream). Typical active solutions consist in an intentional activity of some sort, often something new, as familiarity and repetition lead to the tedious.

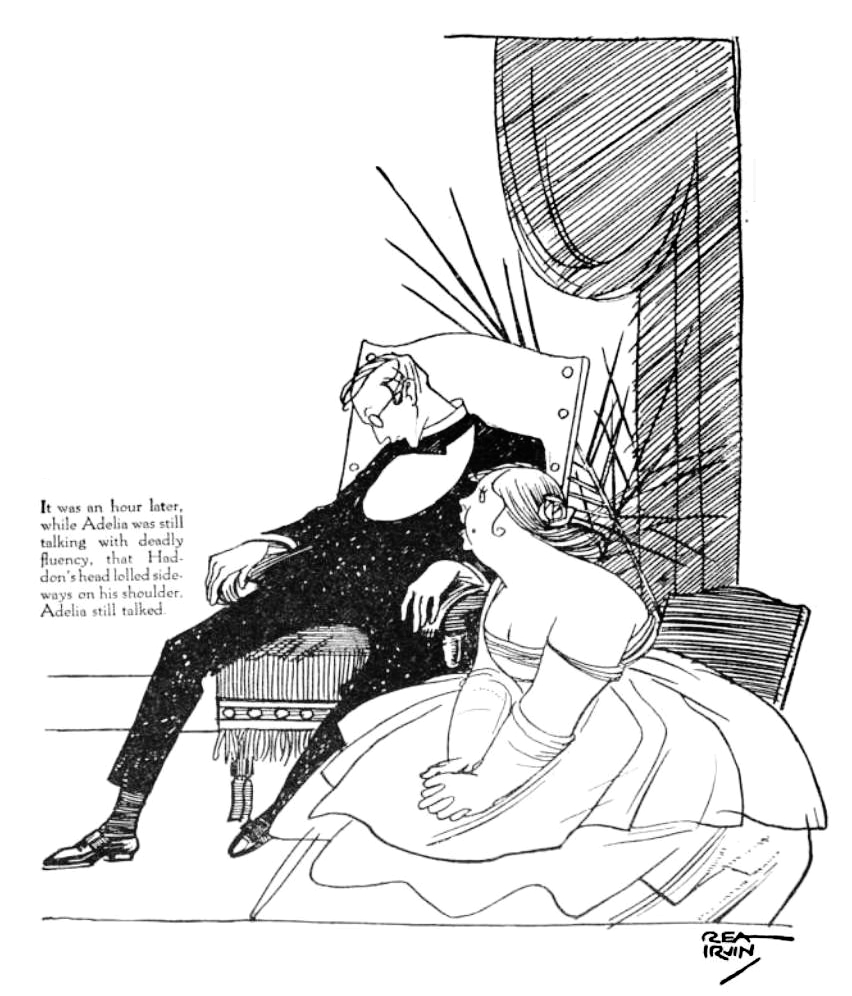
1916 Rea Irvin illustration depicting a bore putting her audience to sleep

During the fin de siècle, the French term for the end of the 19th century in the West, some of the cultural hallmarks included "ennui", cynicism, pessimism, and "...a widespread belief that civilization leads to decadence."

Boredom also plays a role in existentialist thought. Søren Kierkegaard and Friedrich Nietzsche were two of the first philosophers considered fundamental to the existentialist movement. Like Pascal, they were interested in people's quiet struggle with the apparent meaninglessness of life and the use of diversion to escape from boredom. Kierkegaard's Either/Or describes the rotation method, a method used by higher-level aesthetes in order to avoid boredom. The method is an essential hedonistic aspect of the aesthetic way of life. For the aesthete, one constantly changes what one is doing in order to maximize the enjoyment and pleasure derived from each activity.

In contexts where one is confined, spatially or otherwise, boredom may be met with various religious activities, not because religion would want to associate itself with tedium, but rather, partly because boredom may be taken as the essential human condition, to which God, wisdom, or morality are the ultimate answers. Many philosophers, like Arthur Schopenhauer, espouse this view. This view of religiosity among boredom does affect how often people are bored. People who had a higher religiosity while performing boring tasks reported less boredom than people of less religiosity. People performing the meaningless task had to search less for meaning.

Martin Heidegger wrote about boredom in two texts available in English, in the 1929/30 semester lecture course The Fundamental Concepts of Metaphysics, and again in the essay What is Metaphysics? published in the same year. In the lecture, Heidegger included about 100 pages on boredom, probably the most extensive philosophical treatment ever of the subject. He focused on waiting at railway stations in particular as a major context of boredom. Søren Kierkegaard remarks in Either/Or that "patience cannot be depicted" visually, since there is a sense that any immediate moment of life may be fundamentally tedious.

Blaise Pascal in the Pensées discusses the human condition in saying "we seek rest in a struggle against some obstacles. And when we have overcome these, rest proves unbearable because of the boredom it produces", and later states that "only an infinite and immutable object—that is, God himself—can fill this infinite abyss."

Without stimulus or focus, the individual is confronted with nothingness, the meaninglessness of existence, and experiences existential anxiety. Heidegger states this idea as follows: "Profound boredom, drifting here and there in the abysses of our existence like a muffling fog, removes all things and men and oneself along with it into a remarkable indifference. This boredom reveals being as a whole." Schopenhauer used the existence of boredom in an attempt to prove the vanity of human existence, stating, "...for if life, in the desire for which our essence and existence consists, possessed in itself a positive value and real content, there would be no such thing as boredom: mere existence would fulfil and satisfy us."

Erich Fromm and other thinkers of critical theory speak of boredom as a common psychological response to industrial society, where people are required to engage in alienated labor. According to Fromm, boredom is "perhaps the most important source of aggression and destructiveness today." For Fromm, the search for thrills and novelty that characterizes consumer culture are not solutions to boredom, but a mere distraction from boredom which, he argues, continues unconsciously. Above and beyond taste and character, the universal case of boredom consists in any instance of waiting, as Heidegger noted, such as in line, for someone else to arrive or finish a task, or while one is travelling somewhere. The automobile requires fast reflexes, making its operator busy and hence, perhaps for other reasons as well, making the ride more tedious despite being over sooner.

In some Nguni languages such as Zulu, boredom and loneliness are represented by the same word (isizungu). This adds a new dimension to the oft-quoted definition of ubuntu: "A person is a person through other people".

== Causes and effects ==
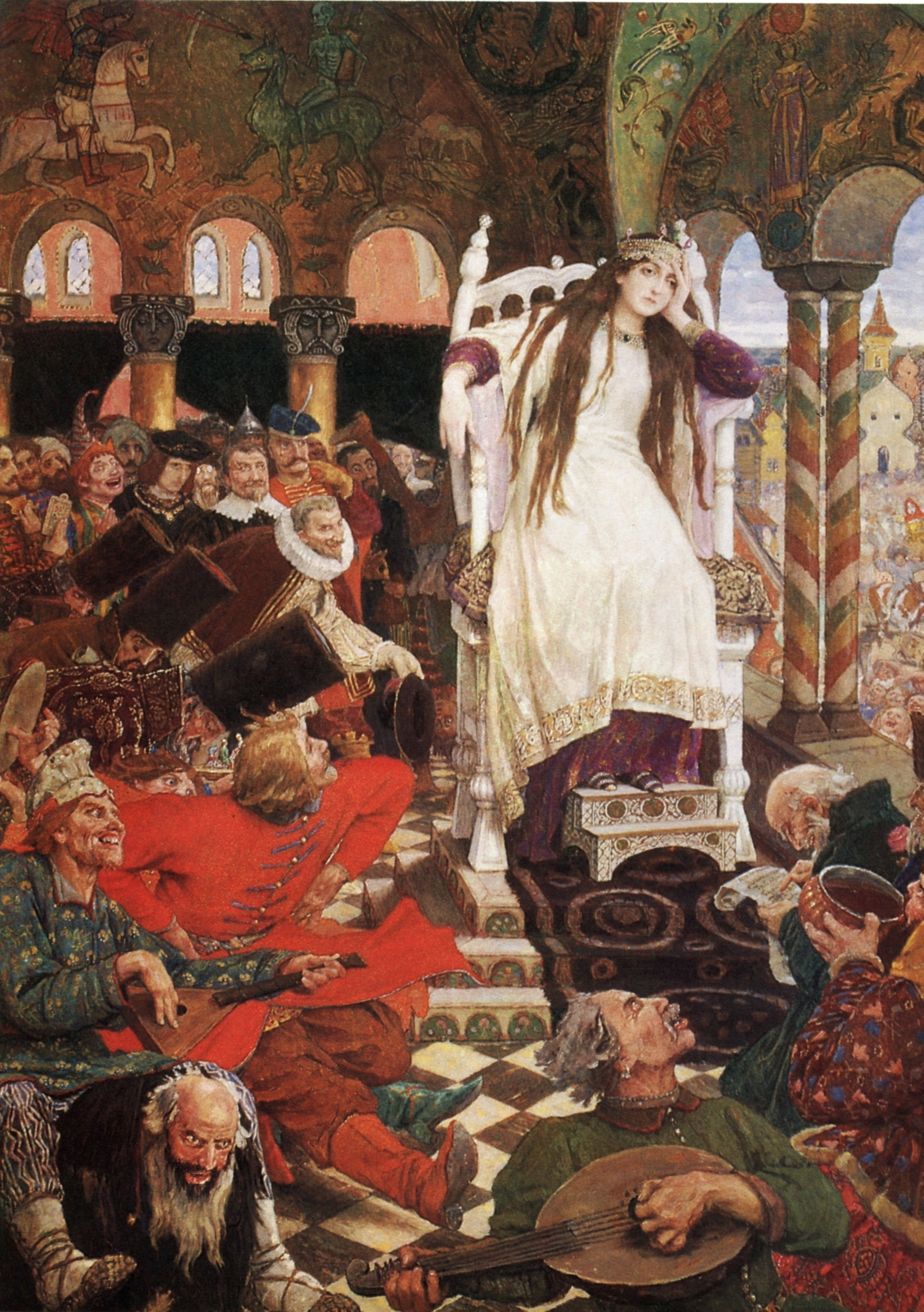
The Princess Who Never Smiled by Viktor Vasnetsov

Although it has not been widely studied, research on boredom suggests that boredom is a major factor impacting diverse areas of a person's life. People ranked low on a boredom-proneness scale were found to have better performance in a wide variety of aspects of their lives, including career, education, and autonomy. Boredom can be a symptom of clinical depression. Boredom can be a form of learned helplessness, a phenomenon closely related to depression. Some philosophies of parenting propose that if children are raised in an environment devoid of stimuli, and are not allowed or encouraged to interact with their environment, they will fail to develop the mental capacities to do so.

In a learning environment, a common cause of boredom is lack of understanding; for instance, if one is not following or connecting to the material in a class or lecture, it will usually seem boring. However, the opposite can also be true; something that is too easily understood, simple or transparent, can also be boring. Boredom is often inversely related to learning, and in school it may be a sign that a student is not challenged enough, or too challenged. An activity that is predictable to the students is likely to bore them.

A 1989 study indicated that an individual's impression of boredom may be influenced by the individual's degree of attention, as a higher acoustic level of distraction from the environment correlated with higher reportings of boredom. Boredom has been studied as being related to drug abuse among teens. Boredom has been proposed as a cause of pathological gambling behavior. A study found results consistent with the hypothesis that pathological gamblers seek stimulation to avoid states of boredom and depression. It has been suggested that boredom has an evolutionary basis that encourages humans to seek out new challenges. It may influence human learning and ingenuity.

Some recent studies have suggested that boredom may have some positive effects. A low-stimulus environment may lead to increased creativity and may set the stage for a "eureka moment".

== In the workplace ==
Boreout is a management theory that posits that lack of work, boredom, and consequent lack of satisfaction are a common malaise affecting individuals working in modern organizations, especially in office-based white collar jobs. This theory was first expounded in 2007 in Diagnose Boreout, a book by Peter Werder and Philippe Rothlin, two Swiss business consultants. They claim the absence of meaningful tasks, rather than the presence of stress, is many workers' chief problem.

A "banishment room" (also known as a "chasing-out-room" and a "boredom room") is a modern employee exit management strategy whereby employees are transferred to a department where they are assigned meaningless work until they become disheartened enough to quit. Since the resignation is voluntary, the employee would not be eligible for certain benefits. The legality and ethics of the practice is questionable and may be construed as constructive dismissal by the courts in some regions.

== In popular culture ==
"Meh" is an interjection used as an expression of indifference or boredom. It may also mean "be it as it may". It is often regarded as a verbal shrug of the shoulders. The use of the term "meh" shows that the speaker is apathetic, uninterested, or indifferent to the question or subject at hand. It is occasionally used as an adjective, meaning something is mediocre or unremarkable.

Ennui is a character in the 2024 film Inside Out 2, which consulted the psychologist Lisa Damour.

=== Superfluous man ===
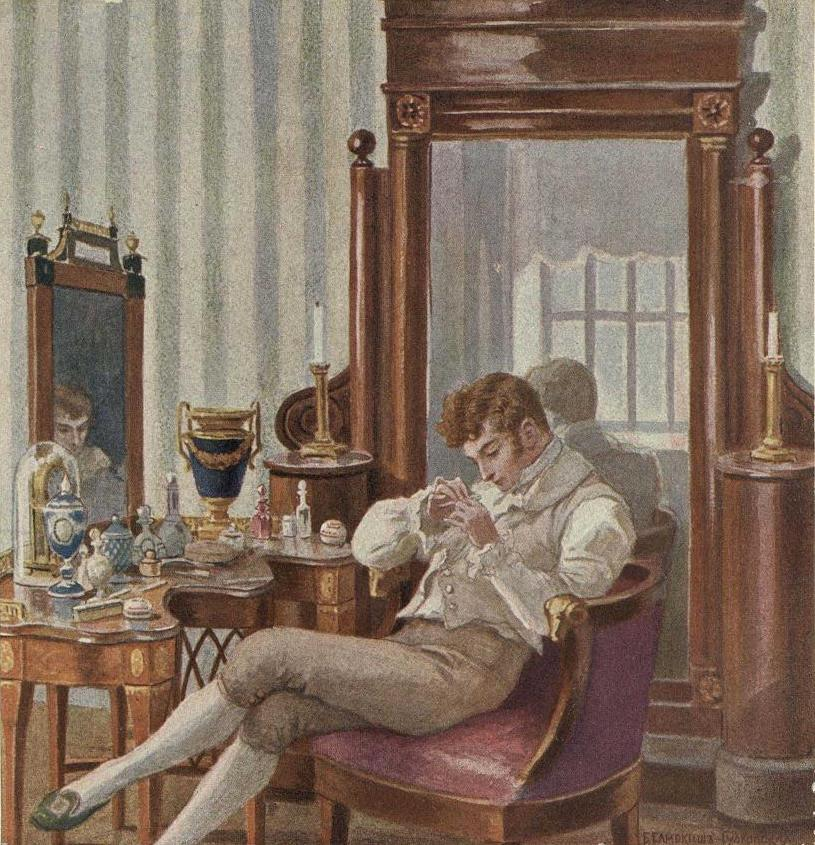
A superfluous man (Eugene Onegin) idly polishing his fingernails. Illustration by Elena Samokysh-Sudkovskaya, 1908.

The superfluous man (Russian: лишний человек, lishniy chelovek) is an 1840s and 1850s Russian literary concept derived from the Byronic hero. It refers to an individual, perhaps talented and capable, who does not fit into social norms. In most cases, this person is born into wealth and privilege. Typical characteristics are disregard for social values, cynicism, and existential boredom; typical behaviors are gambling, drinking, smoking, sexual intrigues, and duels. He is often unempathetic and carelessly distresses others with his actions.

=== Existentialist fiction ===
The bored antihero became prominent in early 20th century existentialist works such as Franz Kafka's The Metamorphosis (1915), Jean-Paul Sartre's La Nausée (French for 'Nausea') (1938), and Albert Camus' L'Étranger (French for 'The Stranger') (1942). The protagonist in these works is an indecisive central character who drifts through his life and is marked by ennui, angst, and alienation.

=== Grunge lit ===
Grunge lit is an Australian literary genre of fictional or semi-autobiographical writing in the early 1990s about young adults living in an "inner cit[y]" "...world of disintegrating futures where the only relief from...boredom was through a nihilistic pursuit of sex, violence, drugs and alcohol". Often the central characters are disfranchised, lacking drive and determination beyond the desire to satisfy their basic needs. It was typically written by "new, young authors" who examined "gritty, dirty, real existences" of everyday characters. It has been described as both a sub-set of dirty realism and an offshoot of Generation X literature. Stuart Glover states that the term "grunge lit" takes the term "grunge" from the "late 80s and early 90s...Seattle [grunge] bands". Glover states that the term "grunge lit" was mainly a marketing term used by publishing companies; he states that most of the authors who have been categorized as "grunge lit" writers reject the label.

== See also ==
- Apathy
- Cabin fever
- Drab (color)
- Dysthymia
- Motivation
