= Peruonto =

Italian literary fairy tale by Giambattista Basile

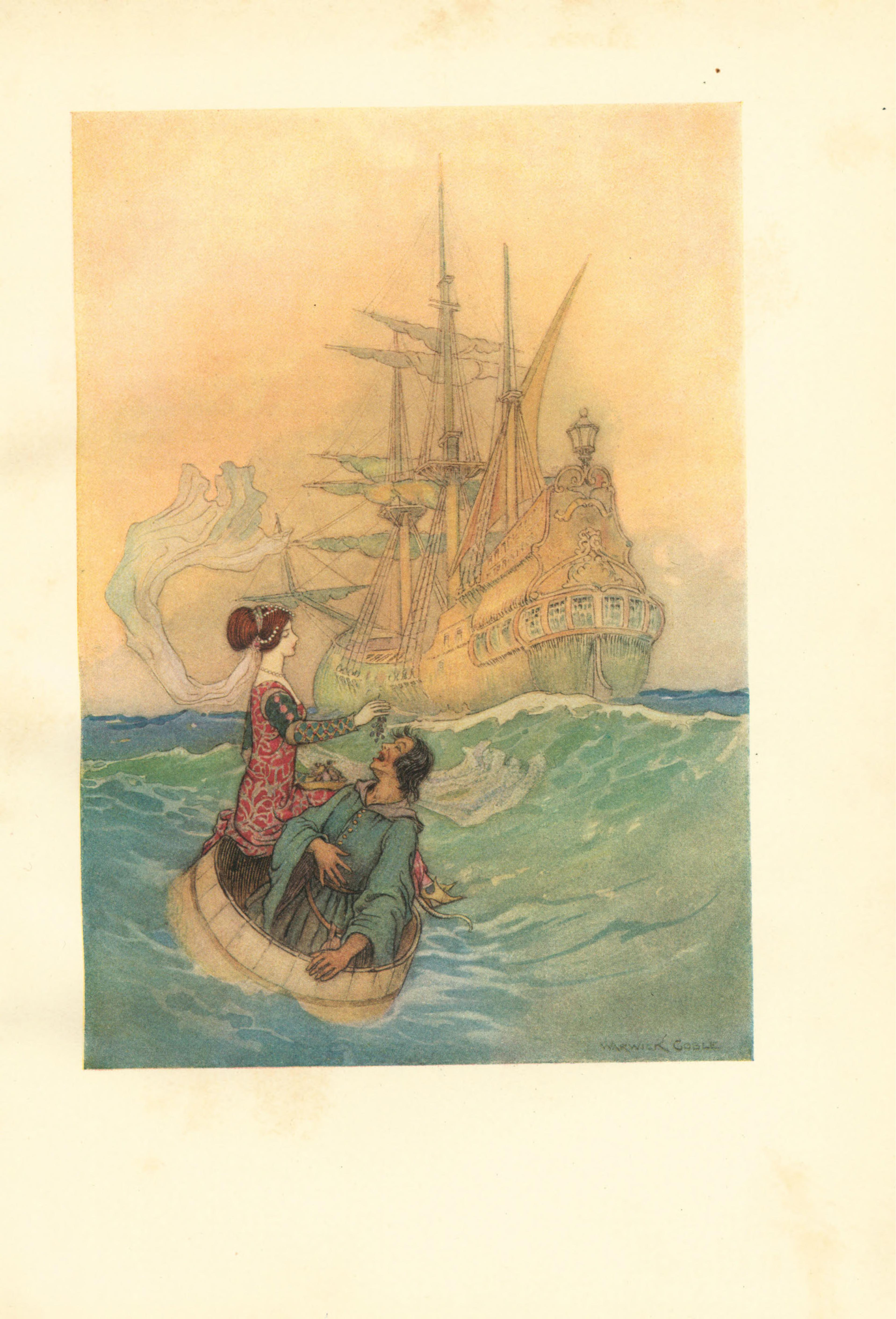
- The princess feeds raisins to her foolish husband, Peruonto, both afloat in the sea. Illustration from Stories from the Pentamerone (MacMillan, 1911).

Folk tale
- Name: Peruonto
- Aarne–Thompson grouping: ATU 675 (The Lazy Boy)
- Region: Italy
- Published in: Pentamerone, by Giambattista Basile
- Related: At the Pike's Behest; The Dolphin; Half-Man; Foolish Hans; Peter the Fool

Peruonto is an Italian literary fairy tale written by Giambattista Basile in his 1634 work, the Pentamerone.

Despite its origins as a literary tale, variants are recorded from oral tradition across Europe, in the Americas, and even in Asia.

== Synopsis ==
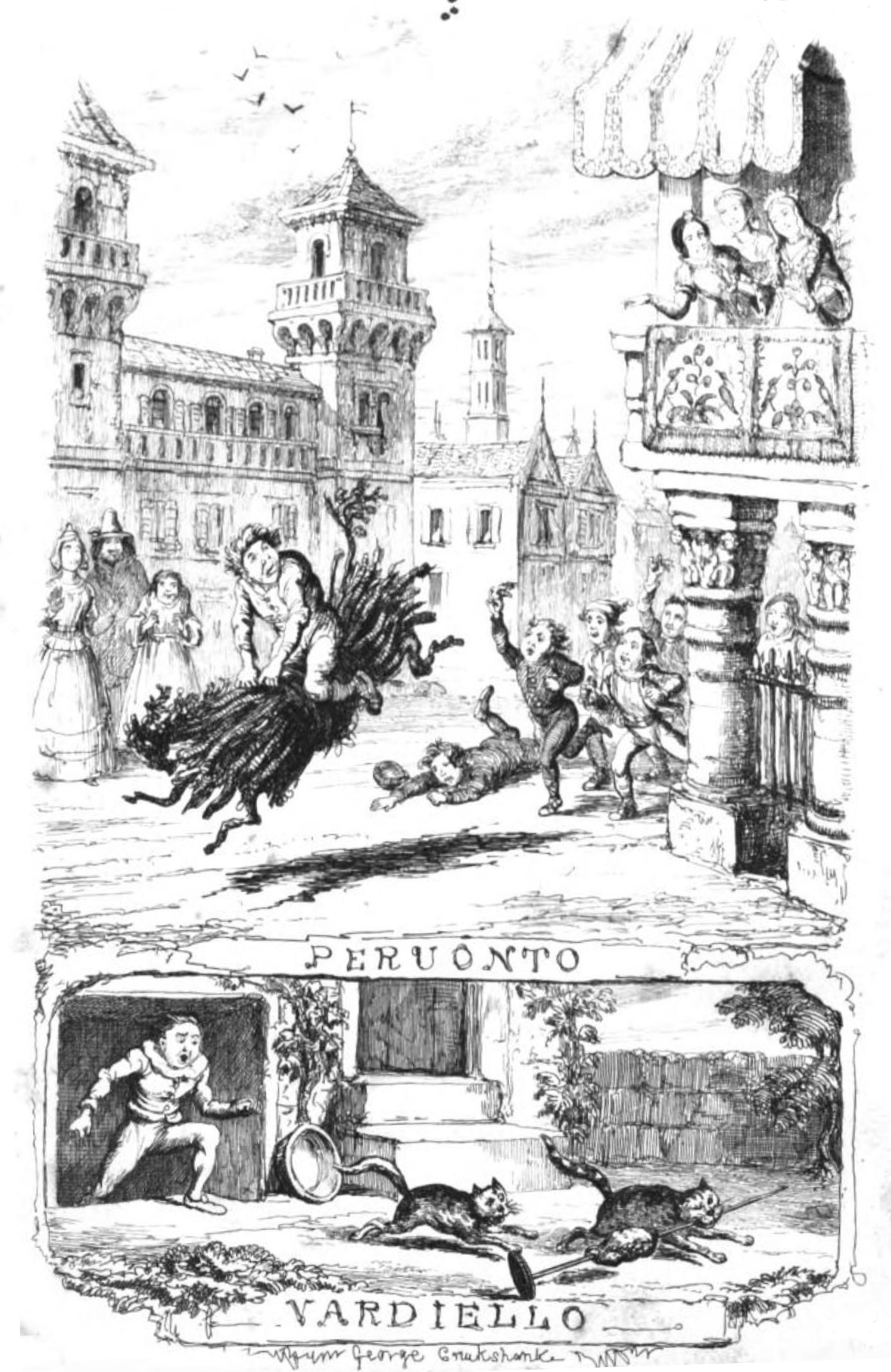
Topwise: Peruonto rides the bundle of sticks. Illustration by George Cruikshank for The Story of Stories (1850).

A widow named Ceccarella had a stupid son named Peruonto, as ugly as an ogre. One day, she sent him to gather wood. He saw three men sleeping in the sunlight and made them a shelter of branches. They woke, and being the sons of a fairy, gave him a charm that whatever he asked for would be done. As he was carrying the wood back, he wished that it would carry him, and he rode it back like a horse. The king's daughter Vastolla, who never laughed, saw it and burst out laughing. Peruonto wished she would marry him and he would cure her of her laughing.

A marriage was arranged for Vastolla with a prince, but Vastolla refused, because she would marry only the man who rode the wood. The king proposed putting her to death. His councilors advised him to go after the man instead. The king had a banquet with all the nobles and lords, thinking Vastolla would betray which man it was, but she did not recognize any of them. The king would have put her to death at once, but the councillors advised a banquet for those still lower in birth. Peruonto's mother urged him to go, he went, and Vastolla recognized him at once and exclaimed. The king had her and Peruonto shut up in a cask and thrown into the sea. Vastolla wormed the story out of Peruonto, and told him to turn the cask to a ship. Then she had him turn it to a castle, and then she had him turn himself into a handsome and well-mannered man. They married and lived happily for years.

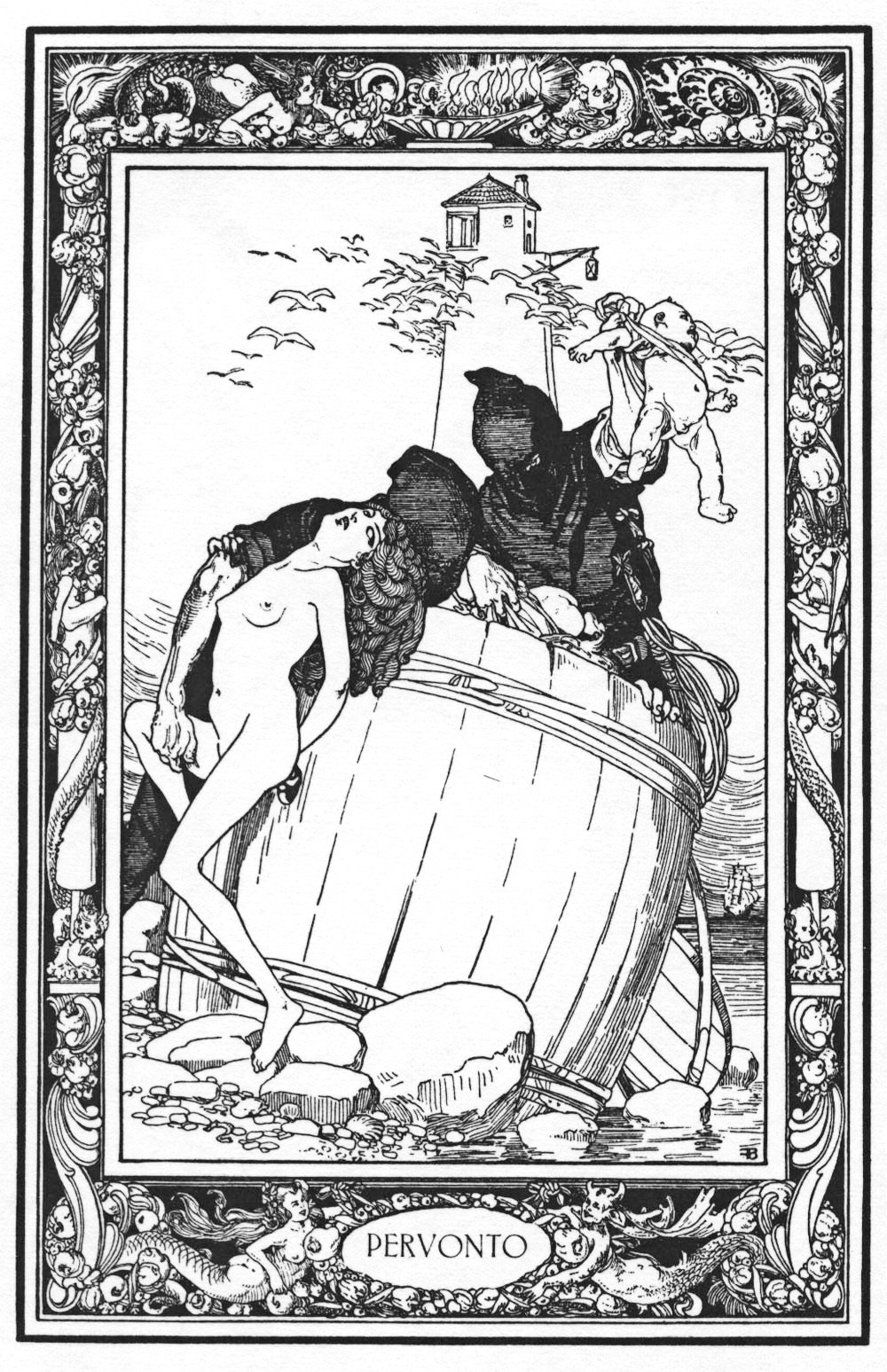
The princess Vastolla is put into the barrel with her child. Illustration by Franz von Bayros for Peruonto (1909).

Her father grew old and sad. His councillors encouraged him to hunt to cheer him up. One day, he came to a castle and found only two little boys who welcomed him and brought him to a magical banquet. In the morning, he wished to thank them, but not only the boys but their mother and father—Vastolla and Peruonto—appeared. They were reconciled, and the king brought them back to his castle where the feast of celebration lasted nine days.

== Analysis ==
=== Tale type ===
The tale is classified in the international Aarne-Thompson-Uther Index as type ATU 675, "The Lazy Boy".

=== Mythological parallels ===
Austrian consul and folktale collector Johann Georg von Hahn saw a parallel between the miraculous birth of the princess's child and their banishment to the sea in a casket and the Greek legend of Danae and her son, the hero Perseus. A similar, yet unique ("found nowhere else in Greece") story is narrated by geographer Pausanias in his Description of Greece: after giving birth to her semi-divine son, Dionysus, fathered by Zeus, human princess Semele was banished from the realm by her father Cadmus. Their sentence was to be put into a chest or a box (larnax) and cast in the sea. Luckily, the casket they were in washed up by the waves at Prasiae. However, it has been suggested that this tale might have been a borrowing from the story of Danaë and Perseus.

Another parallel lies in the legend of Breton saint Budoc and his mother Azénor: Azénor was still pregnant when cast into the sea in a box by her husband, but an angel led her to safety and she gave birth to future Breton saint Budoc.

=== The "half-man" hero ===
Professors Michael Meraklis and Nicole Belmont remarked that, in some Greek and French variants of the tale type, the hero is a half-man son, born due to a hasty wish from his mother. At the end of the tale, the hero assumes a complete human body after he wishes to become a handsome nobleman.

== Variants ==
The tale type of ATU 675 is "told all over Europe" and, argued Stith Thompson, "disseminated rather evenly" over the continent. While noticing its dissemination throughout Europe, Paul Delarue stated that the tale type can be found in Turkey, and "here and there in the rest of Asia" (including Vietnam).

19th century Portuguese folklorist Consiglieri Pedroso claimed that the tale type is "popular everywhere", but specially "in the East of Europe". This seemed to be confirmed by Jack Haney, who observed that the tale is "common throughout the Eastern Slavic world".

Historian William Reginald Halliday suggested an origin in Middle East, instead of Western Europe, since the Half-Man or Half-Boy hero appears in Persian tales.

=== Literary variants ===
Other European literary tales of the tale type are Straparola's "Peter The Fool" (Night Three, Fable One) and Madame d'Aulnoy's The Dolphin.

=== Distribution ===
==== Europe ====
===== Ireland =====
In an Irish variant collected in Bealoideas, a leprechaun is the magical creature that grants the wishes to a half-wit hero.

===== France =====
A folk variant of the tale type is the French Half-Man.

In a Breton language variant, Kristoff, the narrative environment involves the legendary Breton city of Ys.

In a variant from Albret (Labrit), Bernanouéillo ("Bernanoueille"), collected by abbot Leopold Dardy, the donor who offers the protagonist the power to fulfill his wishes is "Le Bon Dieu" (God).

===== Southern Europe =====
In the Portuguese variant The Baker's Idle Son, the pike that blesses the fool with the magical spell becomes a man and marries the princess.

In a Greek variant collected by Johann Georg von Hahn, Der halbe Mensch ("The Half-Man"), the protagonist, a man born with only half of his body, wishes for the princess to be magically impregnated. After the recognition test by the child and the banishment of the family on the barrel, the princess marries a man of her father's court, and the half-man another woman.

At least one variant from Cyprus has been published, from the "Folklore Archive of the Cyprus Research Centre".

====== Italy ======
The "Istituto centrale per i beni sonori ed audiovisivi" ("Central Institute of Sound and Audiovisual Heritage") promoted research and registration throughout the Italian territory between the years 1968–1969 and 1972. In 1975 the Institute published a catalog edited by Alberto Maria Cirese and Liliana Serafini reported 16 variants of type 675 across Italian sources, under the name Il Ragazzo Indolente.

In a variant collected by Sicilian writer Giuseppe Pitre, Lu Loccu di li Pàssuli e Ficu ("The Fig-and-Raisin Fool"), the foolish character's favorite fruits are figs and raisins. He gains his wish-fulfilling ability after an encounter with some nymphs in the woods.

French author Edouard Laboulaye published a "Neapolitan fairy tale" titled Zerbin le farouche, variously translated as "Zerbino the Bumpkin", "Zerbino the Savage" and "Zerbin the Wood-cutter". In this variant, Zerbino is a lazy woodcutter from Salerno who earns his living by gathering firewood and selling, and spends the rest of his time sleeping. One day, in the woods, he creates shade for a mysterious woman that was resting and kills a snake. The woman, in return, reveals herself to be a fairy and tries to repay his kindness, but he refuses by saying he has what he wants. So the fairy grants him the power to make his wishes come true, and disappears into the lake. Zerbino awakes, cuts some wood and gathers them into a bundle. Unawares of his newfound magic, he wishes the bundle to carry him home. On their way, the taciturn princess of Salerno, Aléli, sees the bizarre sight and explodes into laughter. Zerbino sees her and wishes her to fall in love with someone, and she becomes enamoured by Zerbino. Later, the king summons his minister Mistigris to find the man his daughter has fallen in love with. After Zerbino is brought to court, he and Aléli are married and put on a boat along with Mistigris, to an unknown destiny. While adrift at sea, Zerbino wishes he had some figs and raisins. Realizing the man's power, Mistigris then manipulates him into wishing for a magical palace where everything runs without servants. However, when he tries to claim credit for the deed (a claim immediately spoken against by the very walls of the palace), Zerbino decides he is better off without the former minister, and wishes for Mistigris to go to the moon. Later, seeing that Aléli is unhappy at her love being unrequited, Zerbino wishes to love her in return.

Another Italian variant was collected from a 62-year-old farmer, Mariucca Rossi, in 1968. In this variant, titled Bertoldino, poor and foolish Bertoldino helps a fairy, is rewarded with the wish-granting ability, and the royal test with the princess's boy involves golden straw, instead of an apple or a ball.

===== Germany =====
In a German variant by Adalbert Kuhn, Der dumme Michel, after the princess becomes pregnant and gives birth to the boy, the king's grandson insists that, in order to find his father, the king should invite every male in the kingdom, from the upper to the lower classes.

===== Denmark =====
Danish variants are attested in the collections of Svend Grundtvig (Onskerne; "The Wishes") and of Jens Kamp (Doven Lars, der fik Prinsessen; "Lazy Lars, who won a Princess").

In another variant by Grundtvig, Den dovne Dreng ("The Idle Youth"), the titular protagonist releases a frog into the water, which blesses him with unlimited wishes.

===== Iceland =====
In an Icelandic tale collected from teller Herdís Jónasdóttir in Húsafell with the title The Boy in the Pot, lazy but kind boy Sigurdur shares his food with a beggar woman. She rewards him with seven wishes. One day, while he is sitting on a cooking pot, he wishes to see the princess, so the pot transports him there. The princess sees him and falls into a bout of laughter. Sigurdur leaves and absently-minded wishes to have a child with the princess. She becomes pregnant and gives birth to a child. The king summons all men in the kingdom for the child to identify their father. The child identifies Sigurdur, and the king puts his daughter, his grandchild and the lazy boy on a chest and throws them in the sea. The princess asks Sigurdur what put her in that situation, and he explains about the wishes the beggar woman gave him. Not knowing what to do with the remaining wishes, he gives the princess the ability, and she wishes for them to be saved from the sea.

===== Finland =====
The tale type is noted to be "most frequently [collected]" in Finland, and scholarship reports it to be one of the fifteen most popular tales in Finnish tradition, with 168 variants.

===== Norway =====
Tale type ATU 675 is known in Norway with the title Lat-Lars, according to Ørnulf Hodne's The Types of the Norwegian Folktale, with 24 variants recorded.

===== Estonia =====
The tale type is known in Estonia as Havi käsul ("By the Pike’s wish"). Professor Oskar Loorits stated that the ATU 675 tale type is one of the favorite types ("sehr beliebt") in Estonia.

In an Estonian tale published by Oskar Loorits with the title Der faule Johannes ("The Lazy Johannes"), a peasant family lives near the royal city, and has three sons: the elder two industrious and the youngest, named Joan (Johannes), a bit on the lazy and silly side, who likes to lie by their warm stove. One day, he is ordered to fetch water from the well, after they promise to buy him finer clothes. So lazy he is, he returns home empty-handed. After some prodding from his family, Joan goes back to the well and finds a pike in the water. The pike begs to be released, an teaches him a magic command to make his every wish a reality. Joan commands the buckets to go home. Joan passes by the princess, and commands her to be pregnant. The princess gives birth to a son and the king summons all men from the kingdom, so the boy can indicate his father by giving him an apple. They summon all men, but the boy does not react. After lazy Joan comes, the boy gives him the apple. The king then locks his daughter, her son and Joan in a barrel and casts them in the sea. By using the command, Joan creates an island for the barrel to wash ashore. On the island, there is a splendid city that Joan rules as their king. The king visits the island and sees Joan as the king. Joan creates a bridge to connect the island to the king's realm. Joan asks the king to stand in the middle of the bridge and commands the bridge to disappear from under the king. The king drowns in the sea and Joan becomes king.

===== Lithuania =====
Lithuanian folklorist Jonas Balys (lt), in his analysis of Lithuanian folktales (published in 1936), listed 20 variants of type 675, Tinginys berniukas.

===== Sámi people =====
In an Inari Sámi tale titled The Great Lord's Son-in-Law, a poor boy finds a giant pike in a forest lake. The pike teaches him a command to make whatever he wishes into reality. The boy passes by the mansion of a great lord, and, by uttering the command, wishes that the lord's daughter becomes pregnant. And so it happens. The boy is brought to the lord's mansion to interpret the bird's shrill, and is also convinced to marry the girl to give her baby a father.

===== Bulgaria =====
In the Bulgarian tale Der Faulpelz, oder: Gutes wird mit Gutem vergolten ("Lazybones, or: Good is repaid with good"), the lazy youth puts a fish back in the ocean and in return is taught a spell that can make all his wishes come true ("lengo i save i more"). When he passes by the tsar's palace, he commands the princess to be pregnant. In this variant, it is the princess herself who identifies the father of her child. The tale was originally collected by Bulgarian folklorist Kuzman Shapkarev with the title Лèнго - ленѝвото дèте или доброто со добро се изплашчат ("Lengo, the Lazy Child or Good with Good is Repaid") and sourced as from Ohrid, modern day North Macedonia.

===== Romania =====
In a Romanian variant, Csuka hírivel, aranyhal szerencséjivel ("Pike News, Goldfish Fortune"), collected from storyteller Károly Kovács, the protagonist is a gypsy (Romani) youth who captures a goldfish and, in releasing him, learns the magic spell to make his wishes come true. When he is sunbathing near his shack, the princess passes by and, by his wish, becomes pregnant.

===== Poland =====
A collection of Upper Silesian fairy tales by Joseph Freiherr von Eichendorff (unpublished at the time, but in print only later by his descendant Karl von Eichendorff (de)) contains a fragmentary version of the tale type, with the name Der Faulpelz und der Fisch ("The Lazy Boy and the Fish") or Das Märchen von dem Faulpelz, dem wunderbaren Fisch und der Prinzessin ("The Tale of the Lazy Boy, the Wonderful Fish and the Princess"). Scholarship suggests its origin to be legitimately Slavic, since the main character sleeps by the stove and eats cabbage soup, elements present in Russian and Polish variants.

===== Kalmyk people =====
In a tale from the Kalmyk, "Заяни залху кɵвүнә тууль" or "Сказка про ленивого юношу" ("The Tale about the lazy boy"), the hero, a lazy boy, rescues a whale (or a taimen, a kind of salmon or trout, in another translation) that grants the boy the ability to make his wishes come true. The lazy boy wishes the princess to be pregnant. When the king discovers this, he kills a bull, sews its hide, and places his daughter, his grandson and the lazy boy inside, then throws them in the sea. Scholarship notes that the taimen replaced the pike of Russian tales.

==== Americas ====
Scholars Richard Dorson and William Bernard McCarthy reported that the tale type was "well documented" in Hispanic- (Iberian) and Franco-American traditions, and also existed in the West Indies and among the Native Americans.

In a French-Missouri variant collected by scholar Joseph Médard Carrière, Pieds Sales ("Dirty Feet"), poor woodcutter Pieds Sales shares his food with a fairy and receives in return a magic wand that can grant all his wishes. He uses the wand to command the logs to carry him home. This strange vision prompts a surge of laughter in the princess. He uses the wand to make her magically pregnant. After the king finds the father of his grandson, he banishes the family on a barrel to the sea.

In Argentinian variants, the main character, John the Lazy, receives a "virtue wand" from the magical fish to fulfill his wishes.

==== Asia ====
In an Annamite tale, La fortune d'un paresseux ("The luck of a lazy one"), a lazy youth catches a fish. Because he is so lazy, he decided to wash the fish's scales with his urine. A crow steals it and drops it in the king's garden. The princess sees the fish and decides to cook it. She becomes pregnant and gives birth to a son. Her father, the king, throws her in prison and decides to summon all men in the kingdom. The lazy youth, as he passes by the king's palace in his small boat, is seen by the princess's son, who calls him his father.

In a tale from "Tjames" (Champa), Tabong le Paresseux ("Tabong, the Lazy"), collected by Antony Landes, Tabong is an incredibly lazy youth. He catches two fishes, which are stolen by a raven. He gets a third fish and urinates on it, and lets the raven steal it. The raven drops the fish on a basin where the king's daughters are bathing. The youngest daughter takes the fish and brings to the palace to eat it. She becomes pregnant. Her father, the king, orders her to make a napkin of betel leaves and to summon all men in the kingdom. She is to throw the napkin in front of the assemblage, and it will indicate the father. Tabong comes to the gathered crowd and the princess throws him the kerchief. The king finds out about him and orders the execution of both his daughter and Tabong, but the executioners spare their lives. The couple then take residence on the mountainhills. One day, the vulture king sees Tabong lying down and, thinking him dead, flies down to eat him, but the youth catches the bird. The bird then gives the youth a magical stone. Folklorists Johannes Bolte and Jiri Polivka, in their commentaries to the Grimm Brothers fairy tales, listed this tale as a variant of German Dumm Hans ("Foolish Hans") and, by extension, of tale type 675.

In a Thai tale titled Saen Pom, Thao Saenpom or Der Mann mit den Tausend Geschwüren ("The Man with a Thousand Warts"), a man named Saen Pom is covered from head to toe in warts, and works in the king's garden planting crops, including eggplant (in some versions, he waters them with his urine). One day, he sells the eggplants to the daughter of a local king, she eats it and becomes pregnant with a child. After the princess gives birth to her son, the king gathers the male populace so that the boy can recognize his father. He also proclaims that whoever attends the gathering shall bring something in their hand which the boy will pick up is they are his father. Everyone assembles at the palace, but the boy remains still, until Saen Pom comes with a handful of rice on his hand, and the little boy goes towards him. The king, now knowing the cause of his public disgrace, orders his daughter, his grandson and Saem Pom to be cast adrift in the sea on a boat. His commands are carried out, and the trio is sailing to knowhere. However, god Indra appears to him and gives him a magic drum that can grant him three wishes. Saen Pom beats the drum and wishes for his warts to be removed; to rule a city named Thep Nakhorn; and for a golden cradle to be given to his son (which is why he is named U-Thong, 'golden cradle'). Thus, Saen Pom, the princess and the boy (now named Prince U-Thong) live together in Thep Nakhorn before they move to Ayutthaya.

== Adaptations ==
The tale served as basis for the opus Pervonte oder Die Wünschen ("Pervonte, or the Wishes") (de), by German poet Christoph Martin Wieland.

A Hungarian variant of the tale type was adapted into an episode of the Hungarian television series Magyar népmesék ("Hungarian Folk Tales") (hu), with the title A rest legényröl ("The Lazy Boy").

Laboulaye's variant was adapted twice, into a 30 minute long Soviet cartoon called Wishes Come True ("Исполнение желаний") in 1957, and an hour long Czechoslovak movie called Cudák Zerbino in 1982.

== See also ==
- Golden Goose
- The Magic Swan
- The Princess Who Never Smiled
- The Pink
- The Tale of Tsar Saltan (mother and son cast into the sea in a barrel)
- The Fisherman and His Wife (German fairy tale collected by the Brothers Grimm)
- The Tale of the Fisherman and the Fish (Alexander Pushkin's fairy tale in verse)

== Bibliography ==
- Bolte, Johannes; Polívka, Jiri. Anmerkungen zu den Kinder- u. hausmärchen der brüder Grimm. Erster Band (NR. 1-60). Germany, Leipzig: Dieterich'sche Verlagsbuchhandlung. 1913. pp. 485–489.
