= Hail Columbia (film) =

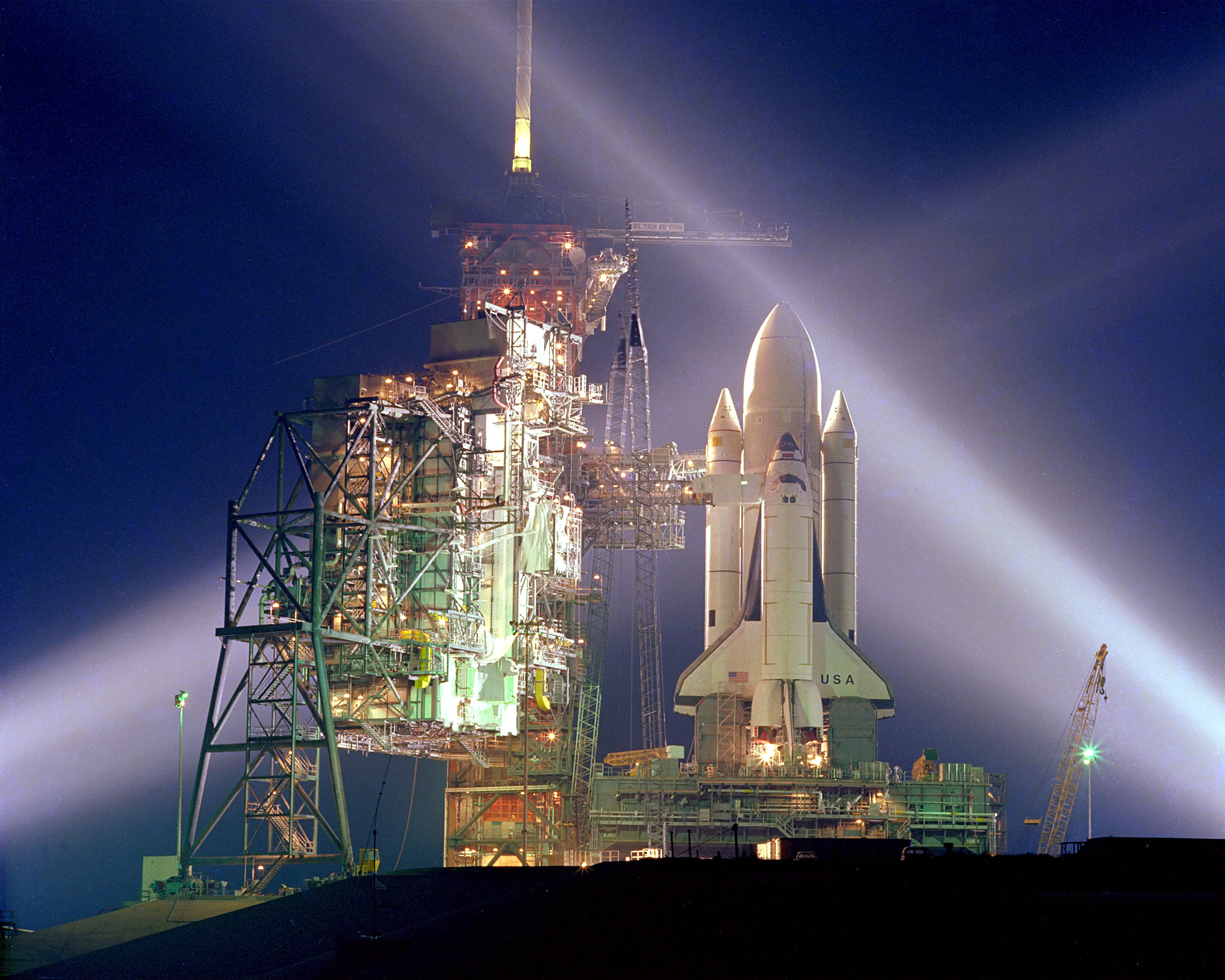
- Columbia, the Space Shuttle featured in the film, preparing for launch
- Directed by: Graeme Ferguson
- Written by: Roman Kroitor
- Produced by: Roman Kroitor; Graeme Ferguson
- Starring: John Young; Robert Crippen
- Narrated by: James Whitmore
- Cinematography: Graeme Ferguson; David Douglas; Richard Leiterman; Haskell Wexler; Ronald M. Lautore; Phillip Thomas
- Edited by: Toni Trow
- Music by: Micky Erbe; Maribeth Solomon
- Production company: IMAX Corporation
- Distributed by: IMAX Corporation
- Release date: June 15, 1982
- Running time: 37 minutes
- Country: United States
- Language: English

Hail Columbia is a 1982 American IMAX documentary film about NASA's Space Shuttle program, particularly the first Space Shuttle, Columbia. The film was directed by Graeme Ferguson.

== Synopsis ==
The film starts off by showing the rollout and assembly of NASA's first space-worthy orbiter, Columbia. This involves showing in high quality, Columbia, 'the world's first true spaceship' being rolled out of the Orbiter Processing Facility, and vehicle stacking at the Vehicle Assembly Building. Columbia is then rolled out on the Mobile Launch Platform to Launch Complex 39A. Once on the launchpad Columbia throttled up the three main engines during a static fire, to make sure they were in working order for the launch in April 1981.

The documentary then follows John Young and Robert Crippen, who would be the Commander and Pilot for STS-1. Robert Crippen was a rookie astronaut who had never been to space. John Young, on the other hand, had been to space four times before: twice during the Gemini program and twice on missions to the Moon, with one of them landing on the Moon (Apollo 16). The documentary gives a nod to John Young's Moon mission, which was where he was when he found out that the Space Shuttle Program had been approved. The next scene shows the press conferences Young and Crippen had to endure as there was a lot of worry about the safety of the mission, as this was the first time humans would fly on an untested vehicle. These included worries about the solid rocket boosters and the Space Shuttle's thermal protection system.

Another feature of the mission mentioned in Hail Columbia, is the escape system used by crew. As the Space Shuttle did not have a launch escape system, if anything were to go wrong on the pad, the crew would have to evacuate and use the slide wire, which was a zip line that took the crew from the Fixed Service Structure down to the surface, where the crew would either run to a bunker or climb into an M113 armored personnel carrier and drive away from the Shuttle.

18 minutes into the documentary, STS-1 is launched. The high quality sound and footage follows Columbia to SRB separation before skipping to the external tank separating. On-orbit tasks are shown, including the opening of the payload bays and inspecting non-critical tiles which were blown loose during the launch. High quality images of the Earth are then shown, before Columbia prepares for the descent back to Earth. The large crowds are shown cheering as the sonic boom of the returning Shuttle is heard. Columbia then made a nominal landing at Edwards Air Force Base, where the astronauts left Columbia and greeted the waiting crowd, talking about how spectacular the mission was. The reusability of Columbia is mentioned before it is flown back to the Kennedy Space Center. The documentary fades out showing the launch of STS-2, showing that Columbia was a reusable spacecraft.

== Creating the documentary ==
This documentary was unusual as it was made completely by a third party. Previously, NASA preferred to make their own documentary for scientific accuracy. Approval to fly an IMAX camera didn't end up happening until the Space Shuttle was deemed operational after STS-4. Taking a cue that the IMAX camera highly realistic experience would be able to make viewers feel like they were on the Space Shuttle, Graeme Ferguson lobbied NASA to fly an IMAX camera on the Space Shuttle. NASA was positive about the proposal as it would show off the STS program in a positive light and get the public excited. Hail Columbia was a big push to allow the IMAX camera to fly to space, due to how well the documentary had been made.

The documentary was intended not to be a promotional piece for NASM, NASA, Lockheed or IMAX. The film was intended to be an educational and uplifting film about spaceflight. Following approval to fly into space in 1984, astronauts were trained how to use the camera, and it was finally flown into space on Space Shuttle Challenger on STS-41C. STS-41D (Space Shuttle Discovery) and STS-41G (Space Shuttle Challenger) were also featured in this to make the documentary, The Dream is Alive.

== Release ==
The documentary was released in theatres on June 15, 1982. It was released on LaserDisc and VHS in 1995, and on DVD in October 2001. The film is 37 minutes long and was the first of a string of IMAX documentaries featuring the Space Shuttle.

== Impact on society ==
The documentary was designed to get people excited about space, particularly about the Space Shuttle which was meant to make space easily accessible and cheap for everyone. Ultimately, this never came to be due to a string of design flaws such as the Space Shuttle tiles which were damaged or broken on multiple flights including STS-1. Partially due to this, the Space Shuttle became too expensive to be a method for everyone to get to space. Despite this, due to the long life of the Shuttle, and help from IMAX documentaries, the Space Shuttle became a household name and children's favourite rocket for over three decades. After damaged tiles compromised Columbia during reentry on February 1, 2003, the phrase Hail Columbia was used as a tribute to the shuttle and a slogan for the recovery efforts.
