= The Golden Goose =

German fairy tale

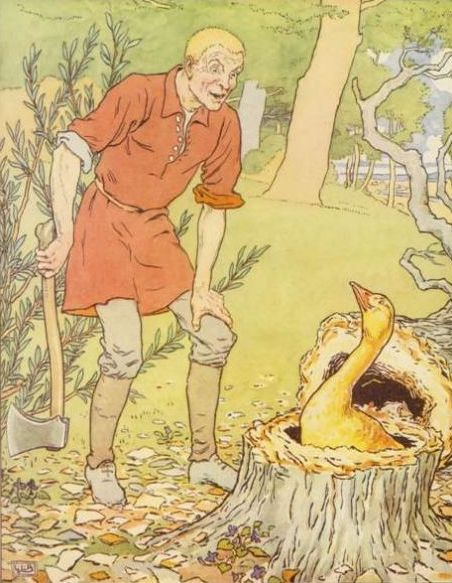
- Simpleton finds The Golden Goose: illustration by L. Leslie Brooke, 1905

Folk tale
- Name: The Golden Goose
- Aarne–Thompson grouping: ATU 571 (Episode of type 513B)
- Published in: Grimm's Fairy Tales

"The Golden Goose" (German: Die goldene Gans) is a fairy tale collected by the Brothers Grimm (KHM 64).

== Story ==
A man and his wife have three sons, the youngest of whom is named Dummling because he is neither handsome nor strong like his elder brothers. The eldest brother is sent into the forest to chop wood, equipped with a rich cake and a bottle of wine. He encounters a little gray man who asks for food and drink but is rudely refused. The eldest brother later injures his arm while cutting a tree and is taken home. The second brother suffers a similar fate, injuring his leg. Dummling, sent out with a burned biscuit and soured beer, generously shares his meager meal with the little old man, who transforms the biscuit and beer into a fine cake and wine. For his kindness, Dummling receives a golden goose found within the roots of a tree he cuts down, guided by the little gray man.

Dummling brings the golden goose to an inn for the night. Upon seeing the goose, the innkeeper's three daughters decide to steal some golden feathers when Dummling goes to sleep. While Dummling is sleeping, the eldest daughter tries to pluck one golden feather but becomes stuck to the goose. The second daughter also tries plucking a feather, but gets stuck to her sister. The youngest daughter tries to help her sisters and becomes stuck as well. The next morning, Dummling departs with the golden goose under his arm, followed by the innkeeper's three daughters. A parson, his sexton, and two labourers interfere, only to get stuck to the parade too.

In a nearby castle, there lives a king whose daughter has never smiled nor laughed. The king promises her hand in marriage to anyone who can make her laugh. Sitting by the window, the princess sees the parade staggering after Dummling and his golden goose and bursts out laughing. They were shocked and sad at the same time.

In another version the king, not wanting his daughter to marry a woodcutter, sets Dummling to three additional tasks: to find someone who can drink all the wine in the cellar, someone who can eat a mountain of bread, and a ship that can sail on both land and sea. Dummling, with the little gray man's help, succeeds in all the tasks. Seeing that he has been bested, the king promptly agrees to give Dummling the princess's hand in marriage.

== Variations ==
Folklorist D. L. Ashliman has pointed out other versions of a Golden Fowl theme: The Goose That Laid the Golden Eggs (Aesop); The Golden Mallard (from the Jataka stories of the Buddha's former births); the Huma bird (Persia).

=== Modern interpretations ===
A musical version of The Golden Goose, written by Dieter Stegmann and Alexander S. Bermange was presented at the Amphitheater Park Schloss Philippsruhe, Hanau, Germany as part of the Brothers Grimm Festival in 2006.

It was also featured as an episode of the PC game American McGee's Grimm where the goose is 10 times its size and its victims have their bodies completely stuck to the goose rather than falling in a conga line as in the story.

=== The Jataka ===
The Buddha (Bodhisatta) was born, grew up, and got married. During his life, he was a member of the Hindu caste group of hereditary priests and scholars. He also had three daughters named Nanda, Nandavati, and Sundarinanda. When he died, he was reincarnated as a golden goose with golden feathers, and after discovering his wife and daughters were being taken care of by others, he decided to give them some of his feathers; he hoped the feathers would help them live comfortably.

Over time, he brought them more feathers to sell, and they were living in a continuous state of comfort and peace; until one day, when his wife became greedy and decided to formulate a plan to steal all of his feathers for money. His daughters did not like the idea of stealing his feathers, so they did not agree to the idea. Alas, the next time the golden goose came back, his wife plucked all of his feathers. When she did this, the feathers immediately changed from golden feathers to white crane feathers. The wife waited for the golden feathers to grow back, but they never did; they grew back white, and the goose flew away, never to return again.

== Classification ==
"The Golden Goose" falls in Aarne-Thompson type 571 (All Stick Together); the appended episode is of A-T Type 513B (The Land-and-Water Ship).

== Literary examination ==
The hero is the youngest of three brothers, given the nickname "Dummling" (Simpleton). His eldest brother is sent into the forest to chop wood (the Task), fortified with a rich cake and a bottle of wine. He meets a little gray man (the Disguised Helper) who begs a morsel to eat and a drop to drink but is rebuffed. The eldest brother meets an accident and is taken home. The second brother meets a similar fate. Dummling, sent out with a biscuit cooked in the ashes of the hearth and soured beer, is generous with the little old man and is rewarded with a golden goose (the Fairy Gift).

The goose has been discovered within the roots of the tree chosen by the little gray man and felled by Dummling.

With the goose under his arm, Dummling heads for an inn, where, as soon as his back is turned, the innkeeper's daughter attempts to pluck just one of the feathers of pure gold, and is stuck fast (Greed A-T Type 68A; Justice is Served). Her sister, coming to help her, is stuck fast too. And the youngest (Least of Three), determined not to be left out of the riches, is stuck to the second. Dummling makes his way to the castle, and each person who attempts to interfere is joined to the unwilling parade: the parson, his sexton, and two laborers.

In the castle lives the King with the Princess (the Princess Prize) who has never laughed. But the despondent Princess, sitting by the window and glimpsing the parade staggering after Dummling and his golden goose, begins to laugh . Dummling, after three more impossible trials including finding a ship that sails on land and sea, sometimes inserted in the tale, in each of which he is assisted by the little gray man, wins the Princess and everyone lives happily ever after.

== See also ==
- The Princess Who Never Smiled
- The Magic Swan
- Peruonto
