= Boreout =

Psychological disorder caused by mental underload

Office workers in a cubicle setting

Boredom boreout syndrome is a psychological disorder that causes physical illness, mainly caused by mental underload at the workplace due to lack of either adequate quantitative or qualitative workload. One reason for boreout could be that the initial job description does not match the actual work.

The syndrome was first given this name in 2007 in Diagnose Boreout, a book by Peter Werder and Philippe Rothlin, two Swiss business consultants.

It had earlier been published about under the name "underchallenged burnout" by American teacher Barry A. Farber in 1991.

== Symptoms and consequences ==
Symptoms of the bore-out syndrome are described by the Frankfurt psychotherapist Wolfgang Merkle as similar to the burnout syndrome. These include depression, listlessness and insomnia, but also tinnitus, susceptibility to infection, stomach upset, headache and dizziness.

== Elements ==
According to Peter Werder and Philippe Rothlin, the absence of meaningful tasks, rather than the presence of stress, is many workers' chief problem. Ruth Stock-Homburg defines boreout as a negative psychological state with low work-related arousal.

Boreout has been studied in terms of its key dimensions. In their practitioners book, Werder and Rothlin suggest elements: boredom, lack of challenge, and lack of interest. These authors disagree with the common perceptions that a demotivated employee is lazy; instead, they claim that the employee has lost interest in work tasks. Those suffering from boreout are "dissatisfied with their professional situation" in that they are frustrated at being prevented, by institutional mechanisms or obstacles as opposed to by their own lack of aptitude, from fulfilling their potential (as by using their skills, knowledge, and abilities to contribute to their company's development) and/or from receiving official recognition for their efforts.

Relying on empirical data from service employees, Stock-Homburg identifies three components of boreout: job boredom, crisis of meaning and crisis of growth, which arise from a loss of resources due to a lack of challenges.

Peter Werder and Philippe Rothlin suggest that the reason for researchers' and employers' overlooking the magnitude of boreout-related problems is that they are underreported because revealing them exposes a worker to the risk of social stigma and adverse economic effects. (By the same token, many managers and co-workers consider an employee's level of workplace stress to be indicative of that employee's status in the workplace.)

There are several reasons boreout might occur. The authors note that boreout is unlikely to occur in many non-office jobs where the employee must focus on finishing a specific task (e.g., a surgeon) or helping people in need (e.g., a childcare worker or nanny). In terms of group processes, it may well be that the boss or certain forceful or ambitious individuals with the team take all the interesting work leaving only a little of the most boring tasks for the others. Alternatively, the structure of the organization may simply promote this inefficiency. Of course, few if any employees (even among those who would prefer to leave) want to be fired or laid off, so the vast majority are unwilling and unlikely to call attention to the dispensable nature of their role.

As such, even if an employee has very little work to do or would only expect to be given qualitative inadequate work, they give the appearance of "looking busy" (e.g., ensuring that a work-related document is open on one's computer, covering one's desk with file folders, and carrying briefcases (whether empty or loaded) from work to one's home and vice versa).

== Coping strategies ==
The symptoms of boreout lead employees to adopt coping or work-avoidance strategies that create the appearance that they are already under stress, suggesting to management both that they are heavily "in demand" as workers and that they should not be given additional work: "The boreout sufferer's aim is to look busy, to not be given any new work by the boss and, certainly, not to lose the job."

Boreout strategies include:

- Stretching work strategy: This involves drawing out tasks so they take much longer than necessary. For example, if an employee's sole assignment during a work week is a report that takes three work days, the employee will "stretch" this three days of work over the entire work week. Stretching strategies vary from employee to employee. Some employees may do the entire report in the first three days, and then spend the remaining days surfing the Internet, planning their holiday, browsing online shopping websites, sending personal e-mails, and so on (all the while ensuring that their workstation is filled with the evidence of "hard work", by having work documents ready to be switched-to on the screen). Alternatively, some employees may "stretch" the work over the entire work week by breaking up the process with a number of pauses to send personal e-mails, go outside for a cigarette, get a coffee, chat with friends in other parts of the company, or even go to the washroom for a 10-minute nap.
- Pseudo-commitment strategy: The pretence of commitment to the job by attending work and sitting at the desk, sometimes after work hours. As well, demotivated employees may stay at their desks to eat their lunch to give the impression that they are working through the lunch hour; in fact, they may be sending personal e-mails or reading online articles unrelated to work. An employee who spends the afternoon on personal phone calls may learn how to mask this by sounding serious and professional during their responses, to give the impression that it is a work-related call. For example, if a bureaucrat is chatting with a friend to set up a dinner date, when the friend suggests a time, the bureaucrat can respond that "we can probably fit that meeting time in."

== Consequences for employees ==
Consequences of boreout for employees include dissatisfaction, fatigue as well as ennui and low self-esteem. The paradox of boreout is that despite hating the situation, employees feel unable to ask for more challenging tasks, to raise the situation with superiors or even look for a new job. The authors do, however, propose a solution: first, one must analyse one's personal job situation, then look for a solution within the company and finally if that does not help, look for a new job. If all else fails, turning to friends, family, or other co-workers for support can be extremely beneficial until any of the previously listed options become viable.

== Consequences for businesses ==
Stock-Homburg empirically examined the impact of the three boreout dimensions among service employees, showing that a crisis of meaning and a crisis of growth negatively affected innovative work behavior. Another study showed that boreout negatively affects customer orientation of service employees.

Prammer studied a variety of boreout effects on businesses:

- Dissatisfied employees cost money because they do not work and have internally resigned
- If employees actively quit internally, they can damage the operation by demonstrating their ability to mentally restore the employment contract.
- The employee's qualifications are not recognized (the company cannot use its potential).
- The qualified employee changes jobs (and takes their experience), which can endanger entire business locations.
- As long as a recession continues, the affected employee remains in the company and leaves the company at the appropriate opportunity. In-house, a problem of distribution of work orders arises.
- Tabooing causes real problems to go undetected.
- Whole generations of employees are lost (because they have no opportunity to fully realize their potential).

== See also ==
- Assembly line
- Acedia (from Greek), a state of listlessness or torpor, of not caring or not being concerned with one's position or condition in the world
- Banishment room
- Boredom
- Bullshit Jobs: A Theory, a 2018 book by anthropologist David Graeber that postulates the existence of meaningless jobs and analyzes their societal harm
- Group dynamics
- Occupational burnout
- Social alienation
- Stress (biology)
- Office Space, a film that features bored employees in unfulfilling jobs
