= The Pink =

German fairy tale

Folk tale
- Name: The Pink
- Also known as: The Carnation
- Aarne–Thompson grouping: ATU 652
- Country: Germany
- Published in: Grimms' Fairy Tales

"The Pink" or "The Carnation" is a German fairy tale collected by the Brothers Grimm in Grimm's Fairy Tales as tale number 76.

It is Aarne-Thompson type 652, the boy whose wishes always come true.

== Synopsis ==
A childless queen prayed for a child. An angel told her she would have a son with the power of wishing. She had such a son, and every day went with the child to a park where wild beasts were kept. There she washed herself in a stream. One day, a cook stole the child and stained the queen's clothing with hen's blood; then he accused the queen of having let the child be eaten. The queen was imprisoned in a tower to starve, but angels were sent to feed her.

The cook, afraid of being caught, had the prince wish for a castle and a little girl as a companion; they lived there, but the cook grew afraid that the boy would wish for his father and reveal his crime, and told the girl, who had grown to a maiden, that she must murder the boy while he slept and cut out his heart and tongue. The girl refused to murder someone so innocent, but the cook threatened to kill her the next day if she didn't obey. She killed a hind and cut out its heart and tongue; then she had the boy hide in the bed. The cook asked about the murder, and the boy got out of the bed and turned him into a poodle for his betrayal.

The boy wished to go home. The girl was frightened at the thought of the journey, so the boy turned her into a pink (or carnation) and went home, with the poodle running after and the pink in his pocket. He went to his mother, who at first took him for the angels who fed her; he assured her he would free her. Then he worked as a huntsman for his own father. He hunted so much game that the king insisted that the huntsman sit by him at the feast. During the feast the boy reveals he is the king's son and that the cook was behind the evil plan all along. He changed the cook back into his own shape, and the king had him executed; he changed the pink back into the maiden, and because she had brought him up so tenderly and refused to murder him, the king sanctioned their marriage.

The queen was freed, but refused to eat, because angels, having supported her, would now deliver her. She died three days later, and the king died of grief, but the prince married the maiden and they ruled the kingdom together.

== Variants ==
German scholar Ulrich Marzolph indicated that an ancestor of the tale type is the Dutch poem Esmoreit. He also mentions the existence of tale type in Judeo-Arabic tradition.

Researcher Richard Dorson reported that the tale type can be found sporadically throughout 15 European countries, mainly in Finland. In addition, Canadian folklorist Carmen Roy stated that the type was "widespread" (tres répandu) across Germany, Scandinavia, Southeastern Europe, Turkey and in the "Indes".

This tale has also been given the alternate title "The Lost Son". In this version the angels are replaced by fairies.

== See also ==
- Peruonto
