= The Magic Swan =

European fairy tale

The Magic Swan is a European fairy tale collected by Hermann Kletke. Andrew Lang included it in The Green Fairy Book.

== Synopsis ==
Two older brothers abused the youngest son, Peter. An old woman advised him to run away. When he did, she told him he should go to a certain tree, where he would find a man asleep and a swan tied to a tree; he should take the swan without waking the man, and everyone would fall in love with its plumage, but when they touched it, he could say "Swan, hold fast" and they would be prisoners. With this, he could make a princess who never laughed to laugh.

He collected a great string of people, and the princess laughed at the sight. The king offered him a choice of land or gold, and he took the land. Then he trapped the princess with the swan and won her as his wife, but the swan flew off.

== See also ==
- Golden Goose
- The Princess Who Never Smiled
- Peruonto
