= The Lazy Boy (fairy tales) =

European fairy tales

The Lazy Boy fairy tales

Folk tale
- Name: The Lazy Boy fairy tales
- Also known as: Dumme Michel, Hans Dumb, Peruonto
- Aarne–Thompson grouping: ATU 675 (The Lazy Boy)
- Region: European
- Published in: The Brothers Grimm and others

The Lazy Boy fairy tales are classic folklore stories found in muiltable cultures. The literary fairy tale involves a character who is lazy and/or foolish. Traditionally, a boy helps a magical being and, in return, receives a wish or is granted a charm. In the Aarne-Thompson-Uther Index of folktale types, The Lazy Boy is given the index of ATU 675. The Lazy Boy fairy tales index number is part of the Aarne–Thompson–Uther Index system. The ATU Index number is one of many cataloged folktale types used in folklore studies; an international group of scholars currently uses and maintains this system.

== Examples of index 675 ==
- Hans Dumb, Hans Dumm, (54a) is a 1812 German folktale, found in early Brothers Grimm tales, Grimms' Fairy Tales.
- Peruonto: a 1634 story found in the Pentamerone collection, a Italian story by Giambattista Basile
- The Princess on the Glass Hill is a Norwegian fairy tale by Peter Christen Asbjørnsen and Jørgen Moe.
- Ivan the Fool, also called Ivanushka the Simpleton, a Russian and/or Slavic folklore.
- Emelian the Fool, Emelyan the Fool, Emelya the Simpleton and At the Pike's Behest are Russian and East Slavic folktales; the hero captures a magical pike that grants every wish whenever he says, "By the pike's command...".
- The Dolphin a French fairy tale by Madame d'Aulnoy.
- Stupid Michel, Dumme Michel (Der dumme Michel, The Foolish Michel) is a 1843 German folktale.
- Lazy Lars (Doven Lars, der fik Prinsessen) is a Danish folktale.
- Peter the Fool in Giovanni Francesco Straparola's The Facetious Nights.
- Juvadi and the Princess is a Italian story.
- Ugly Yann, Yann le Boiteux / Le P'tit Yann, is a French folktale.
- Halfman is a Greek folktale.
  - Modern Moral Adaptations
- Used in contemporary animated bedtime stories, often titled The Lazy Boy, is used to teach lessons about responsibility, diligence, and the pitfalls of laziness.
- Transformative Journeys: These modern retellings frequently involve magical interventions—such as a dragon of boons offering rings of discipline, or a magical transformation into a working animal used to help the lazy protagonist discover the value of hard work. Like the story in the The Sluggish Boy.

== See also ==
- Simpleton
- The Language of the Birds
