= Administrative leave =

Temporary leave of an employee from a job

Administrative leave is a temporary leave from a job assignment, with pay and benefits intact. Generally, the term is reserved for employees of non-business institutions such as schools, police, and hospitals.

== Definition ==
The definition of administrative leave may vary by institution.

Individuals may also be eligible for administrative leave for various reasons including bereavement, jury/court appearances, military leave, internal reviews, and investigations.

In academic settings, administrative leaves are provided for the same purpose as sabbaticals and research/study leaves, i.e., to allow individuals to improve themselves academically and to engage in research to foster their effectiveness as teachers and scholars.

An employee may be placed on administrative leave when an allegation of misconduct is made against an employee, either by a co-worker, student, parent, an alleged victim, or a police officer. During the leave, employers may investigate the situation before determining an appropriate course of action. Administrative leave does not in itself imply that an employee will be disciplined or that an allegation is credible, which is why pay and benefits are not discontinued. It simply allows the employer to investigate the incident, maintaining the employee's status while at the same time removing them from work, eventually leading to either their return or dismissal.

Police officers are routinely placed on administrative leave while being investigated for alleged misconduct, but "nearly always get paid while they're being investigated, a period that typically takes months."

Whistleblowers may also be placed on administrative leave as a way to protect them from potential harassment of a supervisor, such as if they report a case of research misconduct from the principal investigator of an academic project.

== See also ==
- Garden leave
- Reassignment center
- Suspension
