= Absent Teacher Reserve =

Absent Teacher Reserve is a term referring to teachers who are no longer appointed to a specific school, but are reassigned to a school or number of schools within a school district or school system throughout the school year. It may also refer to assistant principals who are rotated from school to school in a similar fashion and there are also AGRs, a guidance counterpart.

== Causes of ATR status ==
Job losses by ATR teachers are typically caused by the closing of poorly performing schools. Teachers who are "excessed" (laid off) due to school closings apply for jobs in other schools or land in a reserve pool if no school hires them. In addition, teachers removed for issues relating to job performance, or problematic issues, can wind up on ATR status (where it exists) due to a legal agreement, decision, or binding arbitration.

According to The New Teacher Project, a national nonprofit that studied New York's ATR pool, 25 percent of teachers entered the pool because they faced disciplinary charges; one third had received unsatisfactory evaluation ratings; and the majority of teachers in the ATR had not made an effort to apply for a new position through the city's hiring system.

Many ATR Assistant Principals were not hired because they cost more than hiring principals wanted to spend on supervision. Assistant Principals placed in the ATR Pool by the NYC Department of education were often experienced and at the top levels of their salary. Placing Assistant Principals in the ATR Pool was also done to force senior supervisors to early retirement, allowing the NYC Department of Education to get new supervision at lower cost. Dan Weisberg in the New York Post asserts this practice was a disservice to students and tax payers.

== In New York City ==
The term is used today in the New York City Department of Education to describe teachers who wound up on ATR status for the above stated causes. Frequently, the teachers lost their positions because the New York City Department of Education closed their school. New York City, in recent years, closed many of its large middle and high schools in favor of smaller schools, offering up space to charter schools. The ATR teacher program developed from the 2005 contract between New York City and the United Federation of Teachers which eliminated seniority rights. A small minority of current and former ATR teachers were exonerated teachers who were formerly assigned to reassignment centers.

=== Status of ATR teachers, Guidance Counselors, Social Workers and Administrators ===
The Absent Teacher Reserve is mainly made up of veteran teachers who are at the top of the pay scale. For the most part, ATR teachers are on their own to locate a new position. However in New York City, principals are in charge of their own budgets, so a person at the top of the pay scale is undesirable even if highly effective and qualified. Many current teacher vacancies are posted on the New York City Department of Education's Open Market website.

ATR teachers rotate week to week from one school assignment to another within their school districts of tenure. They can work as an ATR teacher week to week in an assigned in-district school more than once in a school year, but not in consecutive weeks. An exception in the initial ATR teaching assignment, which is for the entire month of September only.

Several hundred assistant principals excessed from their administrative positions in the New York City Department of Education are also rotate to different schools in ATR status.

=== New UFT contract proposals in 2014 ===
A new contract proposal put forward by the City of New York and the United Federation of Teachers in May 2014 redefines the Absent Teacher Reserve teacher working within the New York City Department of Education. It contains a number of new ATR provisions, including the loss of due process rights by ATRs under certain circumstances set forth in the contract proposal. Starting September 15, 2014, the New York City Department of Education would begin sending the over 1200 teachers in the Absent Teacher Reserve on interviews. Any ATR teacher who misses two interviews without just cause will be considered to have resigned, and will be terminated without due process or the usual Education Law §3020-a proceeding of charges.

After October 15, 2014, ATR teachers without a permanent position will be assigned to schools as temporary provisional hires in their license area of tenure within their school districts and borough. Any ATR who refuses two provisional hires without just cause, or any ATR written up for problematic behavior twice in a row or in two successive school years, would face an expedited 50-day Education Law §3020-a removal process which could lead to termination of employment. ATR teachers covering a regular teacher's leave of absence would not be considered to be in on provisional status.

The proposed contract also states if ATR teachers are hired permanently by a school, the principal's average salary of teachers in their school will not be affected.

In addition, some ATR teachers found guilty of Education Law §3020-a charges would not be placed in provisional positions, but would remain in ATR teacher rotation from school to school within a district. The effect of the proposed agreement, in addition to changes in Education Law §3020-a procedures and protections afforded to non-ATR New York City Department of Education teachers, would create two different categories of ATR teachers, part of a proposed newly created "teacher caste system" which would distinguish between: master teachers; lead teachers; appointed and tenured teachers; ATR teachers; ATR teachers reinstated after the conclusion or settlement of an Education Law §3020-a hearing; and substitute teachers.

The agreement was presented to UFT union membership for a vote in May 2014 and passed. There is a fear by many regular status teachers the forfeiture of due process procedures and the inclusion of expedited Education Law §3020-a charges against ATR teachers by the New York City Department of Education, if approved, could also lead to similar rules being applied to the rest of the teachers, in particular new teachers thrust onto ATR status by ongoing school phaseouts and closings.

=== Comments by UFT president ===
On May 12, 2014, Michael Mulgrew, president of the United Federation of Teachers, acknowledged the new contract proposal left undefined the definition of 'problematic behavior', and said a panel of hearing officers would solidify the definition of problematic behavior. "If someone says a teacher is screaming in the hallway, that's a problem," he said. "If you do that once, you should be written up. If you do that again you should go through an expedited hearing process."

The statement assumes the truth of any allegation, which in itself is problematic, as the vast majority of allegations against teachers ultimately turn out to be false. A fundamental part of due process and Education Law §3020-a hearings was that charged teachers possessed the absolute right to cross-examine witnesses against them and present a defense if they wished. The changes to the UFT contract modified the ATR teacher's right of due process.

=== Comments by mayor ===
New York City Mayor Bill de Blasio stated he trusted principals to judge whether to keep teachers assigned from a pool of rotating substitutes or send them back. City officials said the Absent Teacher Reserve pool had about 1,200 teachers in Spring 2013, and they cost $105 million in 2013 in salaries and benefits, after counting savings from not hiring per diem substitute teachers. The new contract proposal offers them a lump sum of retroactive pay owed plus severance pay of up to 10 weeks for 20 years of service, if they retire during a 30- to 60-day window which will be set if the contract is ratified.New York City Mayor de Blasio Backs Principals on Rotating Substitutes
