= Rotation method =

In philosopher Søren Kierkegaard's Either/Or, the rotation method is a mechanism higher-level aesthetes use to avoid boredom. The method is an essential hedonistic aspect of the aesthetic way of life.

== Overview ==
The rotation method has two forms: the inartistic and extensive, and the artistic and intensive.

The inartistic and ordinary method is to constantly change surroundings and activities to escape boredom. Kierkegaard likens the vulgar rotation method to a false conception of crop rotation, imagining that the soil continuously changes. This method is based on the illusion that boredom is merely produced by environmental constancy, and thus leads to an endless changing by mistaking the regularity of scenery for the cause, hence why this method is also called extensive.

The artistic method truly prescribed by the aesthete, on the other hand, says to instead focus on changing the ways of conceiving, following the quote by Marcus Aurelius: "You can begin a new life. Only see things afresh as you used to see them. In this consists the new life". In contrast to the ordinary method, the artistic method says that limitation creates resourcefulness in using our ability to imagine, using examples of a prisoner playing with a spider, or school children playing with inanimate objects. Kierkegaard likens this to actual crop rotation, which consists in changing the method of cultivation and the kinds of crops. To develop ourselves, this method requires a little extensivity in activity and surroundings—analogous to the fallow land stage of crop rotation. On this ground, the aesthete develops a theory of social prudence, warning against the dangers of friendship, marriage, and official posts.
