= Garden leave =

Employment practice

Garden leave (also known as gardening leave) is a period of time during which an employee remains on payroll after leaving a job, but does not have any responsibilities, and is typically not allowed on company premises. Originally found in executive-level employment contracts, it has become common in the high-tech industries.

Garden leave often overlaps with or supplements non-compete clauses, non-solicit clauses or confidentiality obligations, preventing the employee from taking information or client relationships to a competitor.

== Conditions ==
Employees continue to receive their normal pay and usually benefits during garden leave and must adhere to their conditions of employment, such as confidentiality and non-compete clause.

A similar practice relieves the employee of responsibilities but keeps them on as a consultant (special adviser) for the remainder of their contract, continuing to receive a salary and office during that period.

== Benefit to employer ==
Garden leave benefits the employer by preventing the employee from taking with them up-to-date (and perhaps sensitive) information when they leave, especially when they are very likely leaving to join a competitor. In jurisdictions where employee non-compete clauses are legal, it is used to maintain the effectiveness of such clauses. It is sometimes used when an employee is no longer needed. Sometimes, it is used to avoid careless work, sabotage, or toxic workplace behavior by a disaffected employee.

== Examples ==
When Amazon laid off tens of thousands of employees in late 2025 and early 2026, it gave them a 90-day non-working notice period with full salary, benefits, and stock vesting. In addition, they received severance package and other benefits.

When Goldman Sachs laid off 1300–1800 employees in 2024, employees were offered 30–90 days of garden leave, depending on their seniority and their place of employment.

== Etymology ==
The term originated in the British civil service, where employees had the right to request special leave for exceptional purposes.

The term came to widespread public attention in 1986 when it was used in the BBC sitcom Yes, Prime Minister episode "One of Us", in which a character potentially involved with a Russian spy is threatened with "gardening leave".

== Other uses ==
The term can also refer to the case of an employee between projects, or when, as a result of publicity, their presence at work is considered counterproductive. It has also been used in British football and Formula One in regard to management staff.

== See also ==
- Employment contract
- Administrative leave
- Reassignment center
