= Banishment room =

Method of employee offboarding

A banishment room (Japanese: 追い出し部屋, IPA: [oidaɕi̥beja], also called a chasing-out-room or boredom room in English) is a modern employee exit management strategy whereby employees are reassigned to undesirable or low-value duties, often in another department, with the aim of encouraging them to resign. Since the resignation is voluntary, the employee would not be eligible for certain benefits. The legality of the practice varies by jurisdiction, while its ethics remain widely debated, and it may be considered constructive dismissal in jurisdictions where employers are found to have deliberately forced an employee to resign.

== Examples ==
In Japan, the practice is used to push employees to resign due to the country's strict labor laws, layoffs being taboo, and a tradition of permanent employment.

In France, the practice, called "mise au placard", is illegal and is considered a form of moral harassment.

In his book Parkinson's Law, economist C. Northcote Parkinson discusses the phenomenon.

The Italian-French film Palazzina Laf is based on the real life banishment building of ILVA steelworks in Taranto.

== See also ==
- Boreout
- Reassignment center – External facilities formerly used by the New York City Department of Education where teachers were sent pending disciplinary processes
- Social isolation
- Solitary confinement
