= The Princess Who Never Smiled =

Russian folk fairy tale

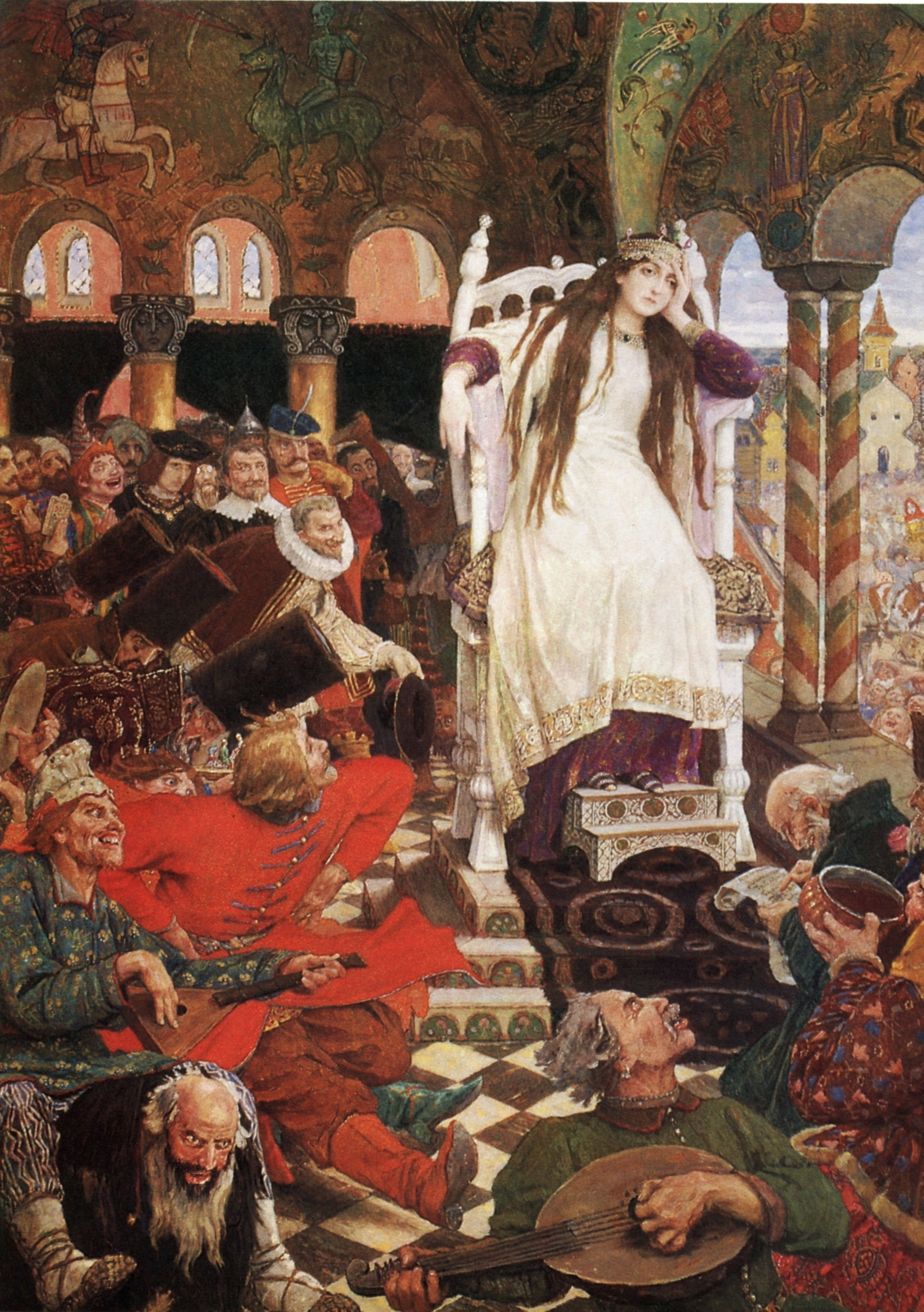
- The Princess Who Never Smiled, painting by Viktor Vasnetsov

Folk tale
- Name: The Princess Who Never Smiled
- Also known as: The Unsmiling Tsarevna; The Tsarevna who Would not Laugh
- Aarne–Thompson grouping: ATU 559 (Making the Princess Laugh)
- Region: Russia
- Published in: Russian Fairy Tales, by Alexander Afanasyev

The Princess Who Never Smiled, The Unsmiling Tsarevna or The Tsarevna who Would not Laugh (Russian: Царевна Несмеяна, Tsarevna Nesmeyana) is a Russian folk fairy-tale collected in the 19th century by Alexander Afanasyev and published in Russian Fairy Tales as tale number 297.

== Synopsis ==
The story takes place in a kingdom where a princess has never smiled. Her father, the king, declares that anyone who can make her smile can marry her. Suitors make their attempts but none succeed.

Meanwhile, a humble worker in the same kingdom is told by his master that he can take as many coins as he wants for his annual labors. The worker in all his humility takes just one coin, which he proceeds to lose down a well. He does the same the next year. Then in the third year, as he goes to drink from the same well, he not only retains his coin, but finds the two coins he lost before.

With his new-found coins the worker decides to travel the world. But before he can leave the country—in his continued humility—he gives one of the coins to a mouse, one to a beetle, and one to a catfish.

Again coin-less, the worker passes by the king's castle, where he proceeds to slip and fall in mud. The mouse, beetle, and catfish, witnessing this and recalling his kindness to them, come to his aid. The princess, looking on, smiles at the scene before her, and the worker, entering the castle and transforming into a handsome man, marries the princess and they live happily ever after.

== Translations ==
The tale was translated as The Princess Who Never Smiled.

== Analysis ==
=== Tale type ===
The Russian tale is classified - and gives its name - to the East Slavic type SUS 559, Russian: "Несмеяна-царевна", romanized: Nesmeyana-tsarevna, lit. 'The Unsmiling Princess', of the East Slavic Folktale Classification (Russian: СУС, romanized: SUS). The East Slavic type corresponds to tale type ATU 559, "Making the Princess Laugh (The Dungbeetle)", of the international Aarne-Thompson-Uther Index. In this tale type, the poor boy wins the hand of the princess through a bizarre presentation of small creatures and bugs that makes her laugh.

Scholar Stith Thompson explained that the name of the tale type is due to the presence of the dung beetle "in nearly all versions of the narrative".

=== Motifs ===
Making the princess laugh, or smile, is a common fairy tale motif of various uses. The culmination of Golden Goose and The Magic Swan (both classified as ATU 571, "All Stick Together"), where the goose or swan causes other characters to adhere to one another, is that the sight causes a princess to laugh for the first time. This ultimately leads to the princess’s marriage in each story. Peruonto and the frame story of Giambattista Basile, however, depict stories where someone who has been laughed at casts a curse on the princess to force her to marry someone.

Before the edition of Antti Aarne's first folktale classification, Svend Grundtvig developed - and later Astrid Lunding translated - a classification system for Danish folktales in comparison with other international compilations available at the time. In this preliminary system, two folktypes were grouped together based on "essential characteristics": folktypes 20A Hold fast! ("Stick to! [The Golden Goose]") and 20B Skellebasserne ("The Scarabees"). Both tales were grouped under the banner "The Princess who can not help laughing".

== Variants ==
An early literary version of the tale type was published in Pentamerone, with the title Lo scarafone, lo sorece e lo grillo ("The Scarab, the Mouse and the Cricket").

In an "Irish fairy tale" compiled by authors Ada M. Skinner and Eleanor L. Skinner, How Timothy Won the Princess, a poor widow sends her son Timothy to sell her three white cows to put food on the table. However, the boy becomes delighted by the performance of a dwarf man, who produces a tiny mouse, a cockroach and a bee - all dressed in fine clothes - to play and dance for the crowd. Fascinated by the little creatures, he trades the cows for them and takes them home. His mother looks disappointed in him, even after he shows her the strange little animals. Some time later, the boy uses the little musicians to make the princess laugh and ends up marrying her.

== Retellings ==
A Sesame Street Book Club book entitled The Sesame Street Alphabet Storybook (which interspersed different objects starting with subsequent letters into infamous stories as told by Sesame Street characters) included a quick telling of "The Princess who Never Laughed" using a xylophone and yo-yo's (X and Y) as props used by two people trying to make the princess laugh to no avail. It comes to end when Cookie Monster, who was lurking behind them, ate both items, which the princess did think was funny.

A 1978 episode of Yeralash retells the story by having a king order his prime minister to make his daughter laugh. A number of real-life comedians are summoned, including Gennady Khazanov and Oleg Popov, but all fail. Then the minister brings forth a young boy to sit at the royal table, and his complete lack of manners does make everyone laugh, including the princess.
