= Half-Man =

French fairy tale

Half-Man is a French fairy tale collected by Achille Millien and Paul Delarue.

It is Aarne-Thompson type 675, a type of tale found throughout Europe. Another variant is Peruonto.

== Synopsis ==
A farmer and his wife had three sons, but the youngest was only half a man: one arm, one leg, etc. One day, the mother sent the sons for wood. The older two got ahead of Half-Man and came to a river. An old woman asked for help across, but they said they did not have time. Half-Man came and helped her. She gave him a magic wand. He used it to get wood, and then to turn himself into a bourgeois. He went to speak to his father, who told him that he was poor, and that one of his sons was only half a man but he liked him better than the others. Half-Man took back his normal form and filled the pantry with things to eat.

He went for a walk and saw the king's daughter. He used the wand to make her magically pregnant with a son who would walk and talk at birth and say that Half-Man was his father. She gave birth nine months later, and the boy said he could recognize his father. The king made all the men pass before the boy, who recognized Half-Man. Angry, the king sent all three of the sons away. As soon as they reached a suitable place, Half-Man conjured up a castle. He went ahead of the princess, turned himself into the bourgeois, and went back. The princess repulsed him because she did not want to deceive Half-Man. Half-Man made himself known, and the princess was pleased.

After some time, Half-Man invited three kings, one his father-in-law, to the castle. His son played with three golden apples, and Half-Man used the wand to put one in his father-in-law's pocket. The boy complained. Half-Man had the castle searched, and then demanded that his guests be searched. His father-in-law was astounded, and Half-Man told him the same magic had made his daughter pregnant.

== See also ==
- The Dolphin
