= Reassignment center =

Facility for holding New York City teachers accused of misconduct

A reassignment center (also known as a rubber room) is a type of holding facility administered by the New York City Department of Education for teachers accused of misconduct while awaiting resolution of their misconduct cases. As of 2007, the city had thirteen reassignment centers. The teachers are not required to do anything, and they may be assigned to the center for months or years.

Exonerated teachers often become absent teacher reserve teachers.

== Uses ==
In June 2009, the New York City Department of Education blamed union rules that made it difficult to fire teachers. Some teachers assert that they have been sent to reassignment centers because they are whistleblowers against administrators for falsifying student test results or publicly challenging Joel Klein, the Schools Chancellor from 2002 to 2011. Three Department of Education employees speaking to the UFT's "New York Teacher" confirmed teachers' allegations that Fordham High School for the Arts Principal Iris Blige filed allegations against the school's UFT chapter leader, to place her in a reassignment center, in order to intimidate her and to set an example to the school's staff.

Reassignment centers arose as a budgetary concern in bureaucratic studies and press coverage in the spring of 2008, and cost the city more than $65 million per year in labor expenses. In April 2010, the city and teachers' union reached an agreement to end the practice. This agreement came in the midst of the first public presentation of a documentary on the centers.

Since the rubber room agreement, the only substantive change has been that there are no longer large rooms filled with reassigned teachers. Teachers are typically reassigned within their own schools, or to other Department of Education buildings throughout the city. Although teachers are now being charged more quickly, it still takes several years to complete the hearing process and for the arbitrator to render a decision. Many teachers are subsequently brought up on "3020-a" charges, which refer to the section of the New York State education law dealing with the discipline of tenured teachers. Unlike any other school district in New York State, no independent panel must vote to prefer charges against a tenured teacher in New York City. The 3020-a trial is held before an independent arbitrator, who is paid by the New York State Education Department but is selected jointly by the New York City Department of Education and the United Federation of Teachers.

In June 2012, it was revealed that the New York State Education Department had not paid its arbitrators for many years, and collectively owed them millions of dollars for cases they had completed, or were in the process of hearing. In frustration, ten of the 24 arbitrators on the New York City panel had quit, while the remaining 14 were refusing to hear any testimony or issue any decisions unless their back wages were paid in full. It was said that this could take several more years to negotiate, further exacerbating the backlog of reassigned teachers.

== Documentary ==
Filmmakers Jeremy Garrett and Justin Cegnar of Five Boroughs Productions produced an independent documentary on the centers, called The Rubber Room, which was the basis for a segment on the radio program This American Life.

== In popular culture ==
In 2010, the then-final episode of Law & Order featured the practice. In the 2015 Netflix series Unbreakable Kimmy Schmidt, the protagonist Kimmy's GED class is being taught by an uninterested teacher who is purposely bad at his job in hopes of being sent to a reassignment center. In the May 2011 episode of The Simpsons titled "The Ned-Liest Catch", school teacher Edna Krabappel is sent to a reassignment room after striking Bart in the back of the head twice for pulling a prank.

== See also ==
- Banishment room
- Administrative leave
- Garden leave
