= The Dolphin (fairy tale) =

French literary fairy tale written by Madame d'Aulnoy

The Dolphin is a French literary fairy tale by Madame d'Aulnoy.

Another literary tale of this type is Giambattista Basile's older Peruonto. A folk variant is the French Half-Man.

== Synopsis ==
A king and queen had several children, but loved them only if they were good and beautiful. One, Alidor, being ugly, in time left his parents secretly. More distressed over their reputation than his fate, they sent after him, but he had chosen his path with care and vanished. He met a young man in service to the King of the Woods and heard of his beautiful daughter Livorette, and so resolved to go there. Once there, Livorette and all her ladies laughed at his ugliness. The queen, however, drew him aside and inquired after him. He soon became a favorite at the court because of his intelligence and courtesy, but Livorette still laughed at him, and being madly in love with her, Alidor soon became melancholy. Trying to distract himself, he fished, but he caught nothing, and Livorette mocked him for it. One day, he caught a dolphin. The dolphin asked him to put it back, promising to help him, and reasoned with him about the princess. When he freed it, he despaired, but it came back and gave him an abundance of fish. It then discussed how to win Livorette, saying it would be necessary to deceive her. He brought back the fish, and then turned himself into a canary. In this form, he wooed the princess but would not speak to anyone else.

After a night, he persuaded the princess to take him to her parents, where he claimed to be a king of an island. They agreed. Alidor visited the court in his own shape, and the queen told him all about the match. That night, after staying in the princess's bedroom until she slept, he went to the seashore and sat on a rock. Grognette the fairy, a dwarf, came out and cursed him for sitting on her rock, saying she would make him suffer.

Meanwhile, a prince sent ambassadors to woo Livorette. She seemed disposed to accept them. However, she grew ill, and a doctor, hidden from knowledge of her rank, said she was going to have a child. Soon after, she had a son. The king decided to have them both killed; the queen managed to have it deferred. Alidor grew mad with the despair, and the dolphin no longer appeared.

When the baby was four, the king had every man give him a gift. When Alidor's made the baby reach for him, the king said he was the father and had Alidor, the princess, and the son thrown into the sea in a barrel. There Alidor, though still mad, summoned the dolphin, and Livorette had him order the dolphin to obey her. Then she had the dolphin conjure them out of the barrel to a magnificent island, and explain how she came to have a child, and then restore Alidor's sanity and make him handsome. They landed on the island, and she forgave Alidor his deceit. The dolphin had them made king and queen of it.

However, Grognette had forbidden her to consider Alidor her husband without her parents' consent.

The queen had learned what the king had ordered for Livorette and reproached him. At last he confessed that he had had no peace since then. They consulted a fairy, who sent them to the dolphin's island. They were shipwrecked, but saved alive. They could not recognize Alidor, or their daughter, or the child, who made them welcome, but Livorette revealed the truth. Their marriage was concluded.

== Other literary versions ==
Scholarship recognizes that French author and conteuse Henriette-Julie de Murat borrowed the theme to write her literary work Le Turbot. de Murat's tale is also considered a literary variant of the tale type ATU 675, but, according to Melissa Hoffman, she drew the focus away from the male protagonist of the type to develop fairy Turbodine as the real protagonist of the story.

== See also ==
- The Canary Prince
