= Zófimo Consiglieri Pedroso =

Portuguese historian, writer, teacher, ethnographer, essayist and folklorist

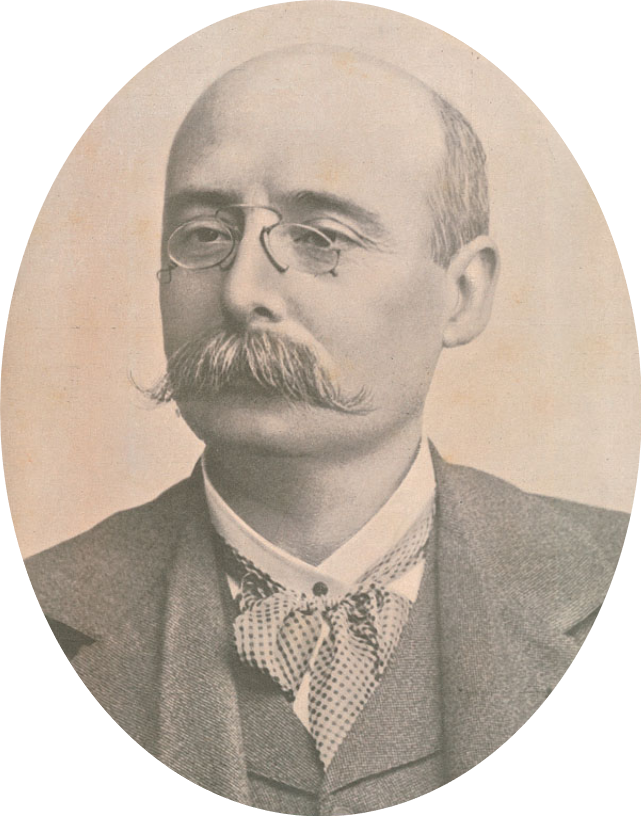
Consiglieri Pedroso

Zófimo Consiglieri Pedroso (1851–1910) was a Portuguese historian, writer, teacher, ethnographer, essayist and folklorist. A collector of a large body of folklore, which became popular and translated before the works of Adolfo Coelho, his Portuguese Folk-Tales were issued in England before their native publication.

Initially militant of the Progressive Party and then Republican activist, was member of the court of the Portuguese Constitutional Monarchy, elected by the constituency of Lisbon. Known for its abilities with speech and improvisation, rarely having to write its own speeches, got famous for the penetration of its flyers and as a Republican doctrinaire known for its enthusiasm and literary knowledge, having published several books and brochures with propaganda theme. He was devoted to the study of ethnography and was one of the introducers of anthropology in Portugal, studying myths, popular traditions and superstitions, activities that demonstrate that he was a scholar of high level from the last quarter of the nineteenth century, deeply imbued with humanist values and revealing himself brilliant essayist. He was president of the Lisbon Geographic Society and effective member of the Sciences Academy of Lisbon.

== Works ==
Consiglieri Pedroso left vast works of Portuguese periodicals, but published the most substantial part of his scientific work in the newspaper The Positivism, including analysis of Popular superstitions and mythography. Some of his works were reproduced in French and English journals. Among his works of monographic character include:

- A cry against the death penalty. Lisbon: 1874.
- History of the French Revolution of Ernest Hamel (translation into Portuguese and preface by Consiglieri Pedroso) (1875).
- The universal suffrage or the intervention of the working classes in government of the country . Lisbon: 1876.
- The constitution of the primitive family: thesis for the contest of the first class of the Portuguese degree: Universal History and Homeland. Lisbon: House of Braganza, (1878).
- On some forms of popular wedding in Portugal: contribution to knowledge of the social status of the former inhabitants of the peninsula. Lisbon: Tip. the Royal Academy of Sciences (1880).
- Contributions to a popular Portuguese Mythology. Port: Commercial Press, (1880).
- Compendium of Universal History. Port: 1881.
- Portuguese Folk-tales. London: 1882.
- Portuguese Popular Traditions, XV: the secular clouds. Port: Typografia Elzeviriana, (1883).
- The Great Times of World History (1883).
- Popular Portuguese Traditions, A Critique Positivist. Paris: 1884.
- Compendium of the History of Eastern Peoples. Lisbon: 1896.
- Alexandre Herculano, the historian. Lisbon: 1910.
- Portuguese Popular Tales (1910).
- Bibliographical publications relating to the Portuguese discoveries catalog. Lisbon: National Press, (1912).
- Contributions for a singer and popular romantic Portuguese
- Contributions for a Popular Mythology Portuguese Ethnographic and other Writings. Lisbon, D. Quixote, 1988.
- Portuguese Folk Tales. Port, 1878. The work has had multiple printings, including: São Paulo: Landy, 2001; Lisbon: Vega, 1992 (ISBN 978-972-699-031-4).

Another important set of publications was included in the series of pamphlets called Democratic Propaganda, a series of pub-style brochures published every two weeks. The main titles were:

- The right of dissolution. Democratic Advertising - Published biweekly for the people. Lisbon: National Typ. Vol IX, 1887. 32 p.
- Parliamentarians incompatibilities". Democratic Advertising - Published biweekly for the people. Lisbon: National Typ. Vol XXXVII, 1888. 31 p.
- The political Oath . Democratic Advertising - Published biweekly for the people. Lisbon: National Typ. Vol XIII, 1887. 32 p.
- The Elector Guide. Democratic Advertising - Published biweekly for the people. Lisbon: National Typ. Vol VIII, 1887. 32 p.
- Words to the electors. Democratic Advertising - Published biweekly for the people. Lisbon: National Typ. Vol XI, 1887. 32 p.
- What should be an election. Democratic Advertising - Published biweekly for the people. Lisbon: National Typ. Vol X, 1887. 32 p.
