= Rubber room (bunker) =

Launch pad emergency refuge facility

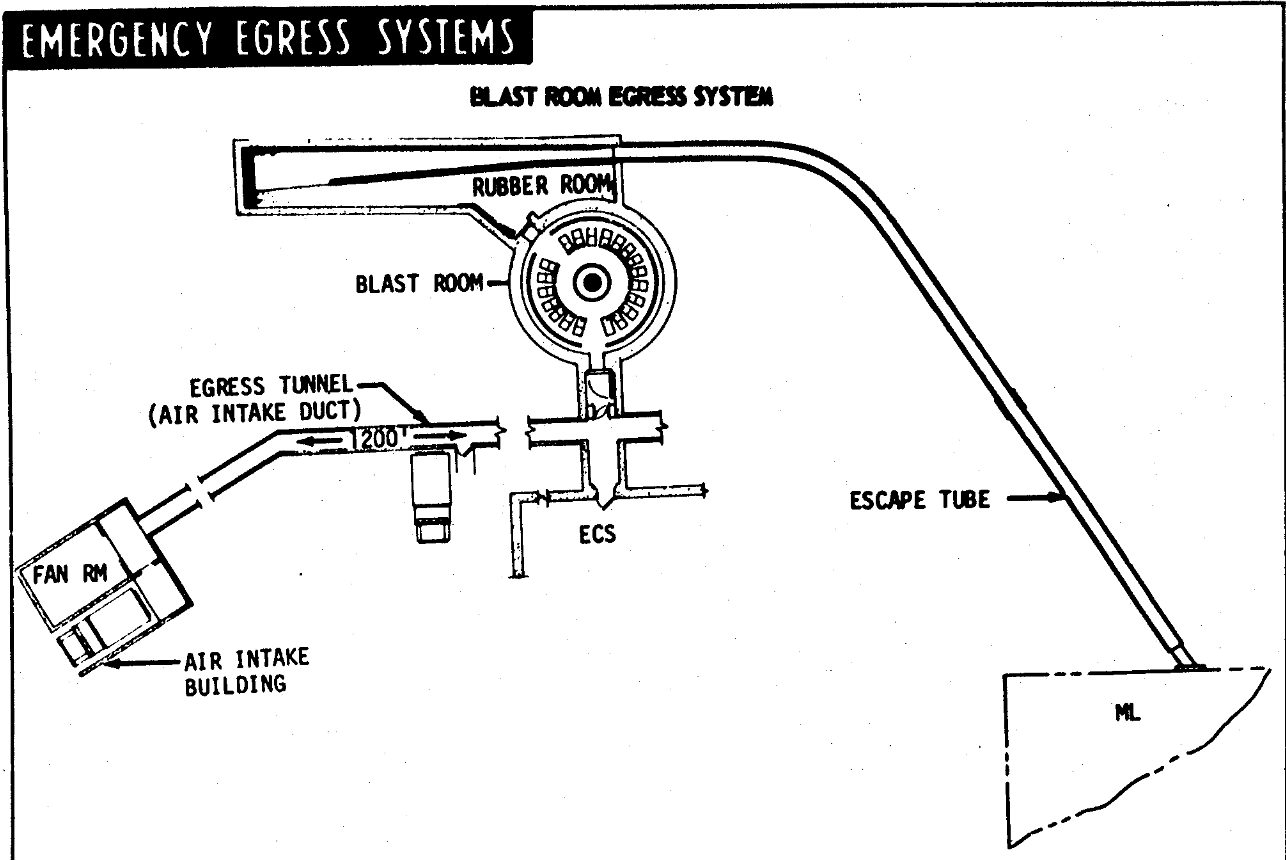
Layout of the rubber room showing entry slide and egress tunnel. The launch pad is in the lower-right, designated "ML".

Rubber room is the nickname given to the emergency egress bunkers located 40 feet (12 m) beneath the launch pads at Kennedy Space Center Launch Complex 39; there is one below each of the two pads. Built in the 1960s for the Apollo program, they were intended to provide a safe refuge for personnel on the launch pad in the event of an imminent explosion of the rocket, when a rapid egress of the pad is required and the normal evacuation methods would take too long. The bunker was designed to withstand the explosion of a fully fueled Saturn V rocket on the pad above, and could support up to 20 people for 24 hours.

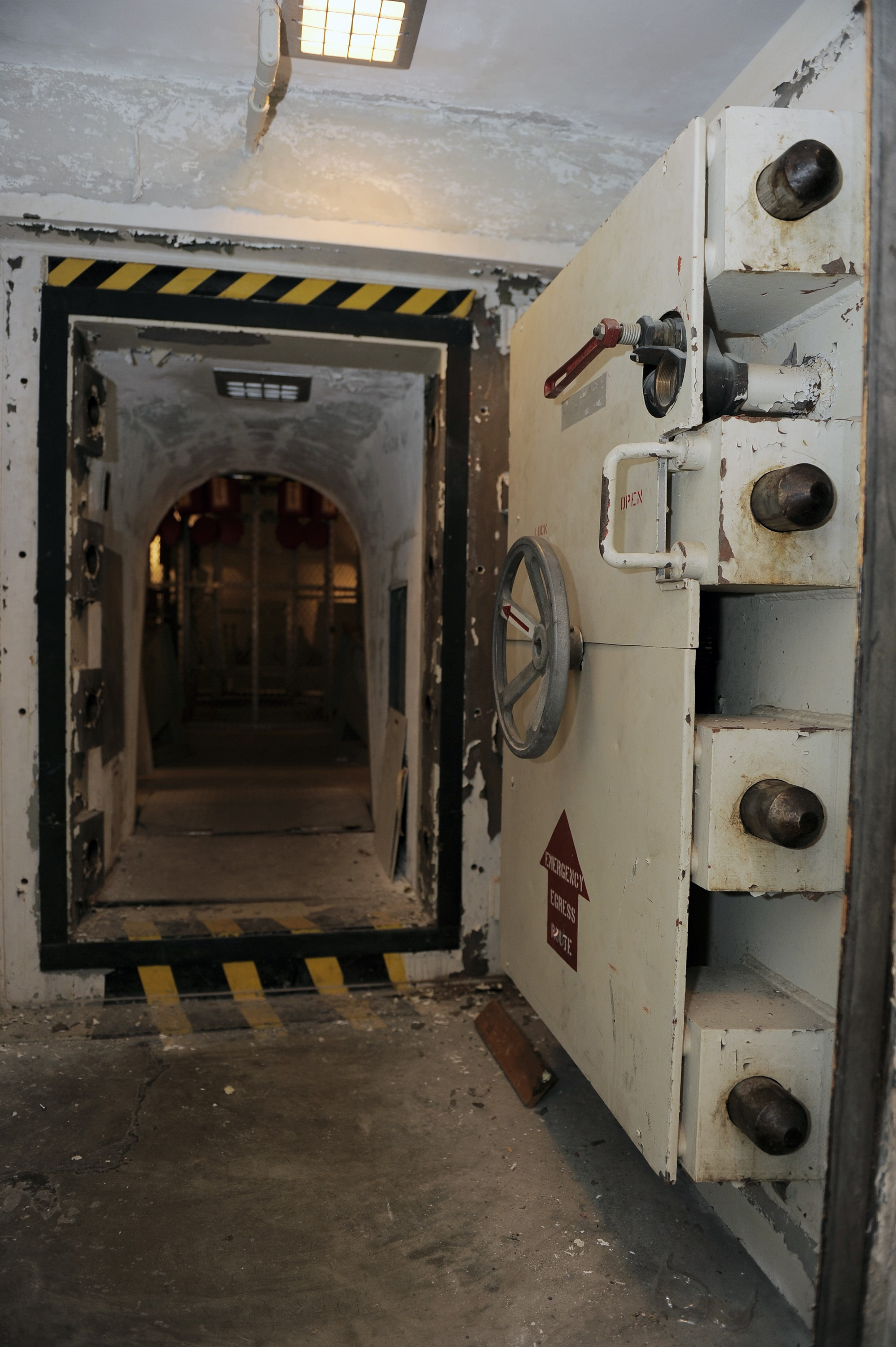
Blast door to the rubber room, looking from the antechamber into the main room

Access to the bunker was via a 200-foot (61 m) slide chute that began at an opening on the surface of the launch pad. Personnel would slide down this chute that would bring them to a small rubber-padded antechamber outside of the blast room. While this padded antechamber was the only part officially designated "rubber room", the nickname came to be used for the blast room itself. A large steel door, similar to a bank's vault door, led into the bunker proper and would be closed and sealed when all personnel were safely inside.

The bunker itself was circular in shape with a domed ceiling. The concrete floor was floating, supported by springs and shock absorbers. Once seated and strapped into the contoured seats, this design would protect the occupants from the forces generated by the explosion of the rocket on the hardstand above, estimated by NASA engineers to be a fireball 430 meters (1,410 ft) wide, which would burn for 40 seconds, reaching temperatures of 2,500 °F (1,370 °C). The bunker could withstand a blast pressure of 500 pounds per square inch (3,400 kPa) and 75G of acceleration.

The exit from the bunker was through a 366-meter (1,201 ft) long tunnel, in reality a large air duct, that opened to the outside at the perimeter of the pad. In the event that this route was blocked, there was an emergency escape hatch in the roof of the dome.

The rubber room was primarily intended for use by pad workers during fueling and terminal count operations, though a mechanism was in place for the crew of the rocket to use it as well. A high-speed elevator would bring the astronauts from the 320-foot (98 m) level of the launch tower to the surface level of the pad in under 30 seconds. From there, they would use the slide chute as normal to bring them to the bunker. This was the third available escape route for the astronauts, the first being the launch escape system on the rocket itself, and the second being a slide-wire that the crew would use from the top of the rocket to slide to a point well away from the pad.

After the Apollo era ended, the rubber rooms fell into disrepair. Water pooled in the bunkers and the exit tunnels, and several species of Florida wildlife took up residence. When the launch pads were refurbished for the Space Shuttle, the bunkers were classified as "abandoned in place" rather than refurbished with the pad above. As of 2012, the pad B room was closed due to lead paint risks, but the pad A room remains accessible. When NASA leased pad A to SpaceX in 2014, the terms of the lease included a requirement that the rubber room, among other historic portions of the pad, be preserved as historical artifacts.
