= Sampo =

Magical artifact in Finnish mythology

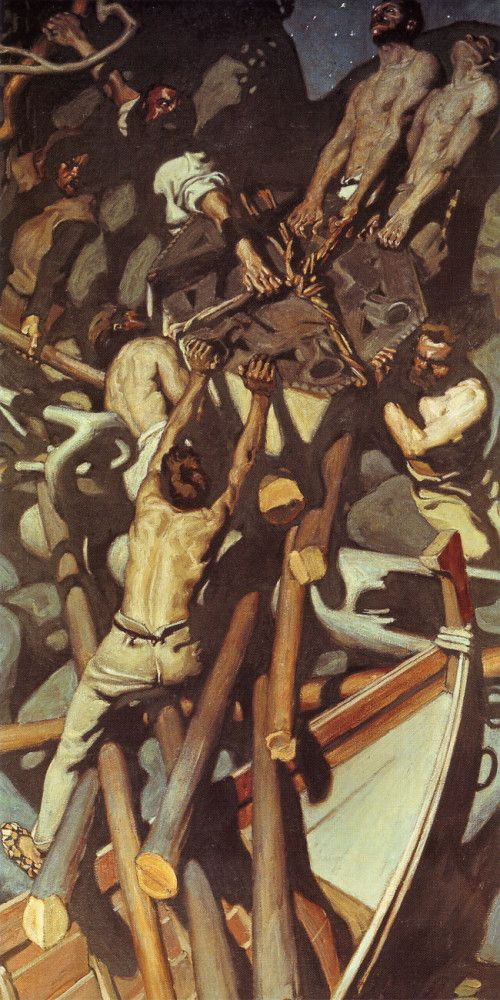
The Theft of the Sampo, Akseli Gallen-Kallela, 1897

In Finnish mythology, the Sampo (pronounced [ˈsɑmpo]) or Sammas (pronounced [ˈsɑmːɑs]) is a magical device or object described in many different ways, constructed by the blacksmith, inventor and originally the sky god Ilmarinen, and which brings riches and good fortune to its holder, akin to the horn of plenty (cornucopia) of Greek mythology. A central myth in Finnish mythology is the idea that the sampo was once in Pohjola but a group of heroes attempt to steal it. Sammas, as something at the center of the world, also exists in Estonian mythology.

The Sampo or Sammas has multiple other names in runic songs as well, including Samppu, Samppi and Kirjokansi (pronounced [ˈkirjoˌkɑnsi]).

== Interpretation ==
The Sampo has been interpreted in many ways: a world pillar or world tree, the Sun, a compass or astrolabe, a chest containing a treasure, a Byzantine coin die, a book, a decorated Vendel period shield, a Christian relic, etc. In the Kalevala, compiler Lönnrot interpreted it to be a quern or mill of some sort that made flour, salt, and gold out of thin air. The world pillar/tree hypothesis was argued for by figures such as theosophian Pekka Ervast, historian of religions Uno Harva and the linguist Eemil Nestor Setälä in the early 20th century.

In Estonian runic songs, the Sammas, an oak or an ash (akin to the Yggdrasil) is something which stands at the center of the world. According to the archaeologist Elena Kuz'mina, the Sampo mill myth originates from the Indo-European skambhá 'support, pillar, column', and was borrowed into Finno-Ugric. In the Atharvaveda, the skambhá is a creature that supports the universe, analogous to the World Tree – the Sampo has been claimed to be the Finnish equivalent of the world tree. At the top of this tree is the kultakätkyt 'golden cradle', which according to Forest Finn tietäjä Kaisa Vilhunen is a rainbow which works as a bridge between heaven and earth.

The world pillar or tree is attached to the center of the sky, turning it around, while also working as a path between the different layers of the world. Vilhunen gave a detailed explanation of the Sammas which supports the theory of its nature as the world pillar. She described it as a golden pillar with a golden head and a copper foot. The golden head is Polaris, which attached the Sammas to the sky. The pillar went down deep underground like the roots of a tree and was attached to a copper mountain there. The dome of the sky spun around Polaris, which Vilhunen described as the Sammas "grinding". According to her, the root has three guardians: Tuokkoi, Pajas and Ruoskakup 'whip guy'. They make sure no one can dig up the gold at the root of the pillar so it won't snap. The identities of these guardians are a mystery, but Pajas could mean Ukko: the Forest Finnish Sammas myths originate from Savonia, where Ukko also has the name Pajainen. Jenuveeva (Genevieve) sat at the top of the pillar, at the center of three branches.

The mill-like qualities of the Sampo connect it to the Grotti mill from Norse mythology, which like the Sampo is a source of wealth and everything good. Martti Haavio saw the two as different branches of the same myth of creation. He also connected it to myths from Ancient Indian literature. He thought Sampo's name comes from *tšampa, which would also be the origin of sammakko 'frog'. Connection to Ancient India holds up, as Sampo is possibly a loan from Indo-Iranian languages, but the frog theory is not supported in contemporary research. Maths Bertell also connected the Sampo to the Grotti mill and the cult of Freyr.

For runic singers, the Sampo was a representation of growth and its mythic origin, and initially not an object. Ilmarinen was able to forge the Sampo because he is a god, the one who had also created the sky. Anna-Leena Siikala thought that the concepts of the theft of the Sampo and its mill-like qualities are a sign of influence born out of contacts with the Norwegians. A runic song from Satakunta mentions a smith creating a noitakone 'witch/shaman machine', the nature of which is a mystery, unless it's a Sampo-like magical object.

Matti Kuusi described the purpose of the Sampo myth as a ritual song of the birth of agriculture.

The meaning of the Sampo had become unknown even to the Karelian runic singers of the 19th century. Some of them called it an iron kantele, a boat, the stars and the Moon, or a millstone. To the Forest Finn Maja Hindriksdotter, it was like a magical bird. Julius Krohn thought the Sampo was the Sun, while Jens Andreas Friis thought it was a Sámi drum. Kaarle Krohn did not agree with Friis: he thought the theft of Sampo had been mixed with two other runic songs, God's sea voyage (Finnish: Luojan laivaretki) and Release of the Sun (Finnish: Päivän päästö), and it to have originally described a raid on Gotland.

Runic songs from Kainuu and White Karelia describe Sampo, Sammot, Samppu or Samppi as something which has words in it: Aukasen sanasen arkun, / Virsilippani viritän, / Jott'ei samppu sanoja puutu / Eikä Sämpsä siemeniä, / Umpilampi ahvenia, / Eikä kallio kiviä ("I open my chest of words, / Tune my box of songs, / So Samppu would not lack words / Nor Sämpsä seeds, / A closed pond perches, / Nor a rock stones"). According to the White Karelian runic singer Jaakko Huovinen, Samma is the thing where all runes and sorcery originate from.

== In runic songs ==
=== The Sea Beneath the Yard and the Rune of Four Maidens ===
The Sammas appears in the Estonian and Finnish runic songs in chain poems which describe the island at the center of the world. The runic songs are called the Sea Beneath the Yard (Estonian: Meri õue all) and the Rune of Four Maidens (Finnish: Neljän neidon runo), and versions of them can be found from a big area from Ostrobothnia, Tavastia, Savonia, Karelia, Ingria, land of the Votians, Estonia and Setomaa.

These runic songs describe in various ways that there is a sea, and in the sea is a grassy island. In the center of the island is a well and the Sammas or and oak. At the end of the Sammas or on the branches of the oak is a maiden and a sifter (symbolizing the sky much like the term kirjokansi), and the maiden has a son. From a Christian perspective, this virgin mother and her son symbolize Virgin Mary and Jesus at the center of the sky. This tree at the center of the world also often has a golden cradle (a rainbow and a bridge between earth and sky) which was used when the bear and a spark of fire was brought down from the heavens to earth.

In Finnish versions, there is often a house at the center of the island in addition to an oak. A small man like a smith might descend from the golden cradle. In the house are four maidens, originally three luonnottaret and, from a Christian perspective, Virgin Mary and her sisters. War often appears as a theme: either the singular maiden on the island gives birth to sons who go to war, or one of the four maidens cries in the house because her brother has gone to war.

In addition to these runic songs, the runic song Golden Wheel Oak (Finnish: Kultapyörätammi) has been connected to the world tree: the oak has an apple on every branch, every apple has a golden wheel (the Sun) on it, and on the wheel is a cuckoo, a stream of gold dripping from its beak.

=== The Theft of Sampo ===
The oldest written down version of the myth of the Theft of Sampo (Finnish: Sammon ryöstö) was written down from the Forest Finns in 1817, proving that the myth had once been known in Savonia and Central Finland. According to this version, Väinämöinen and Joukahainen once went to Northlands to fetch the Sammas. When it was in their boat, Joukahainen told Väinämöinen to start singing spells but he refused, saying that the gates of the Northlands were still too close. Eventually he started singing, and the Sammas itself jumped up to the sky. Joukahainen jumped after it, hitting it with his sword and cutting off two of its toes. One fell into the sea, making it salty; the other one on land, making wild hay grow. If he had been able to cut off the third toe, crops would grow without the need of farming.

According to many White Karelian versions, Louhi promised to give Väinämöinen a maiden to marry if he forges for her the Sampo. Väinämöinen did not have the skill for this but knows Ilmarinen to be able to forge it as he had also forged the sky. He sent Ilmarinen to Pohjola with wind, where he forged the Sampo. Later, Väinämöinen pointed out all the riches the Sampo was providing for Pohjola and suggested they go steal it back. Other heroes such as Tiera or Vesiliito might join them depending on the version. They ploughed loose the roots of the Sampo from the rocky hill of Pohjola and took it to their boat. Ilmarinen suggested Väinämöinen start singing but Väinämöinen refused, thinking the gates of Pohjola were still too close. An ant urinated on a crane's foot and the crane screamed, waking up the people of Pohjola. Louhi transformed into a bird, ordering the forces of Pohjola to chase the heroes. Väinämöinen struck Louhi's bird toes with a sword or a paddle and the Sampo ends up in water, making the seas rich.

Kaarle Krohn saw the Forest Finn version as a description where the Sampo and Louhi turned into a bird had fused into one, like the Sampo itself was a bird. Väinö Salminen pointed out the Forest Finn belief that storm itself was an evil being, a storm bird from Pohjola, like it was the storm bird which had taken the Sampo from Väinämöinen and Joukahainen's boat.

Runic songs from Kainuu do not speak of a theft of Sampo: instead, it is the Sun which Väinämöinen frees from a rock by forging, set in the same mythic setting as the theft of Sampo. Because majority of the versions of the theft of Sampo are from Western White Karelia, Siikala considered the myth to originate from the coasts of the Bothnian Bay from where it had spread eastwards as most families of Western White Karelia were of Ostrobothnian origin.

== In the Kalevala ==
The Sampo is a pivotal element of the plot of the epic poem Kalevala, compiled in 1835 (and expanded in 1849) by Elias Lönnrot based on Finnish and Karelian oral tradition.

In the expanded second version of the poem, the Sampo is forged by Ilmarinen, a legendary blacksmith, to fulfill a task set by the witch queen of Pohjola, Louhi, in return for her daughter's hand.

"Ilmarinen, worthy brother,
Thou the only skilful blacksmith,
Go and see her wondrous beauty,
See her gold and silver garments,
See her robed in finest raiment,
See her sitting on the rainbow,
Walking on the clouds of purple.
Forge for her the magic Sampo,
Forge the lid in many colors,
Thy reward shall be the virgin,
Thou shalt win this bride of beauty;
Go and bring the lovely maiden
To thy home in Kalevala."

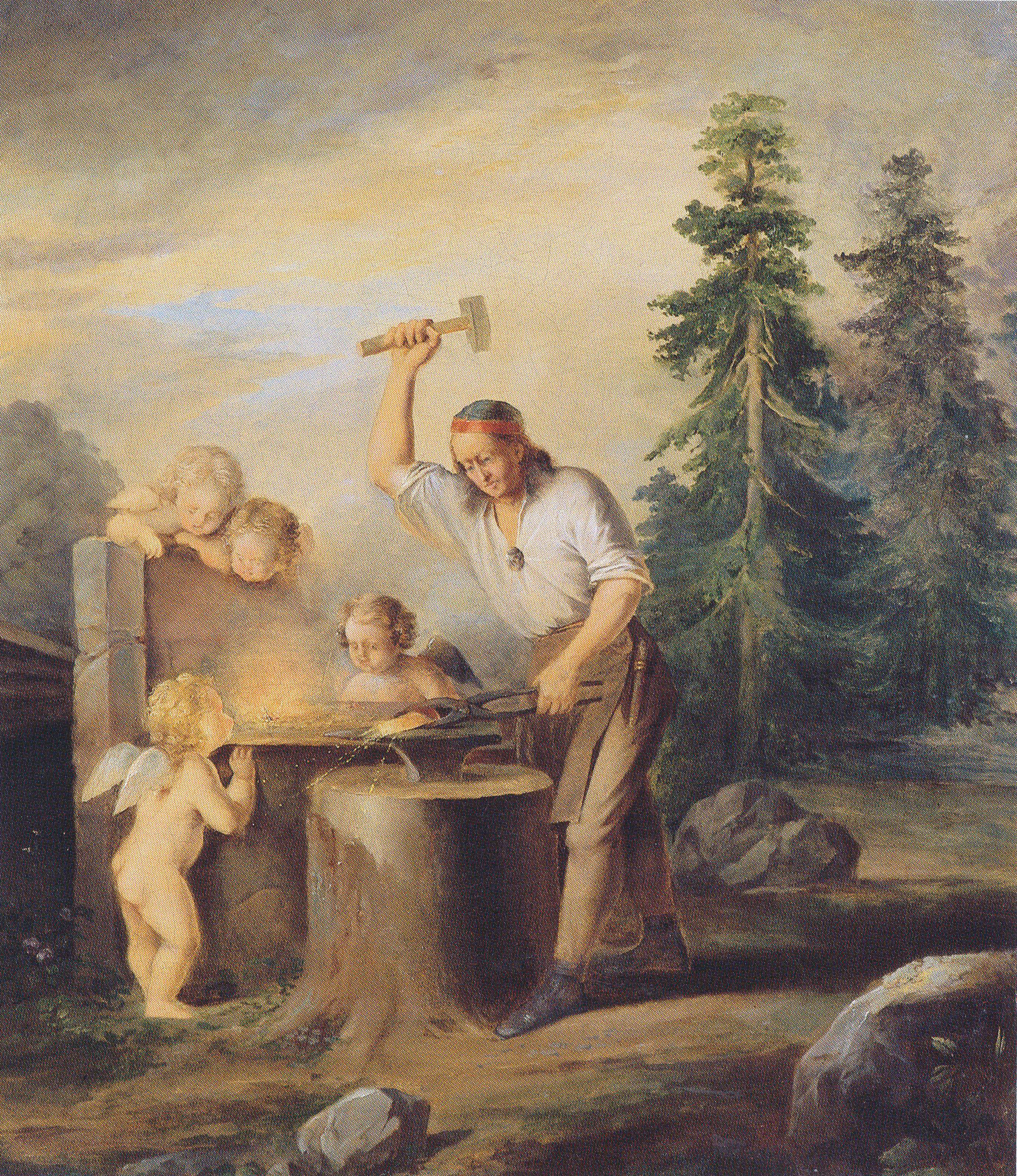
Ilmarinen Forges the Sampo, Berndt Godenhjelm, 19th century

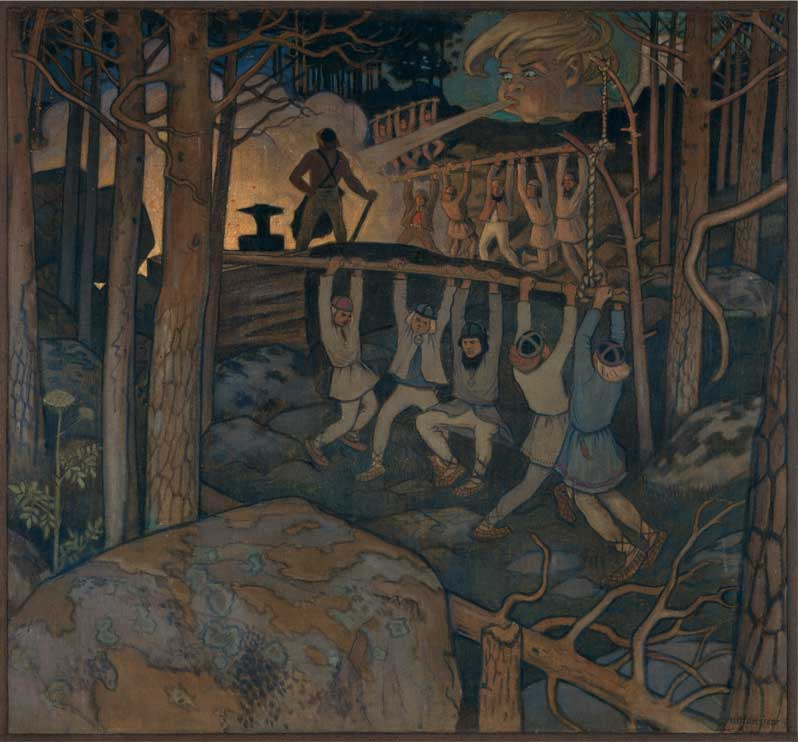
The Forging of the Sampo, Väinö Blomstedt, 1897

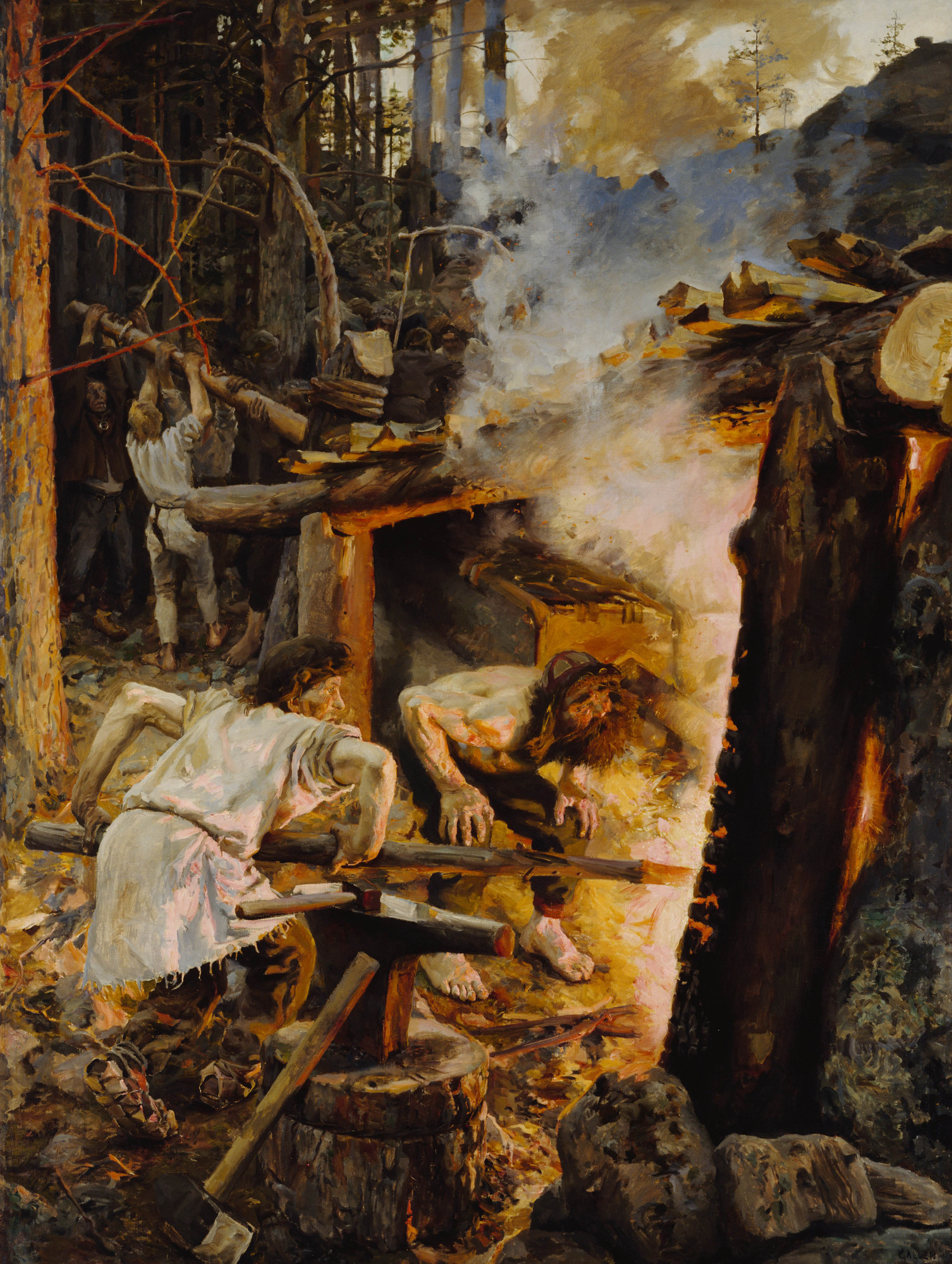
The Forging of the Sampo, Akseli Gallen-Kallela, 1893

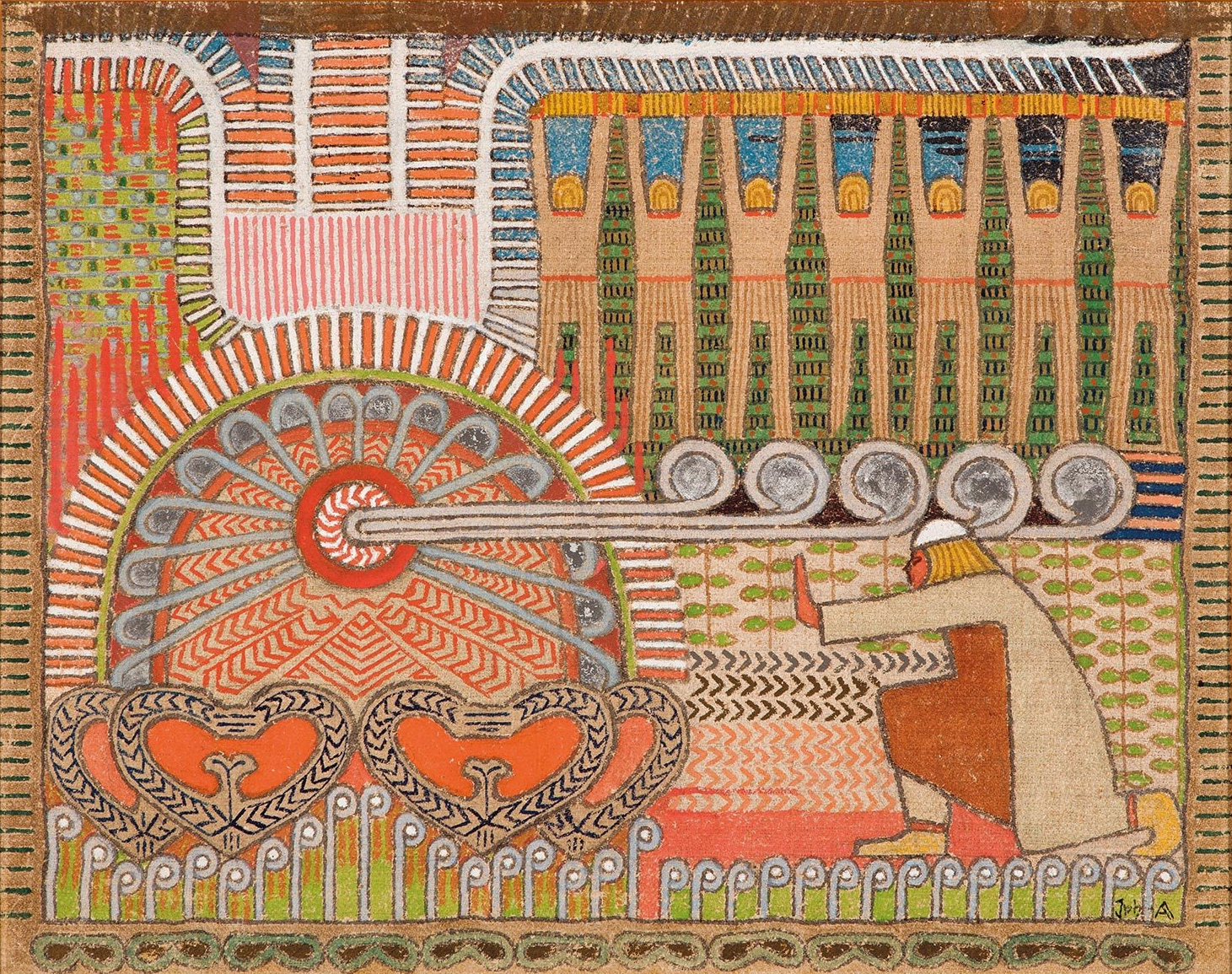
The Forging of the Sampo, Joseph Alanen, 1910–1911

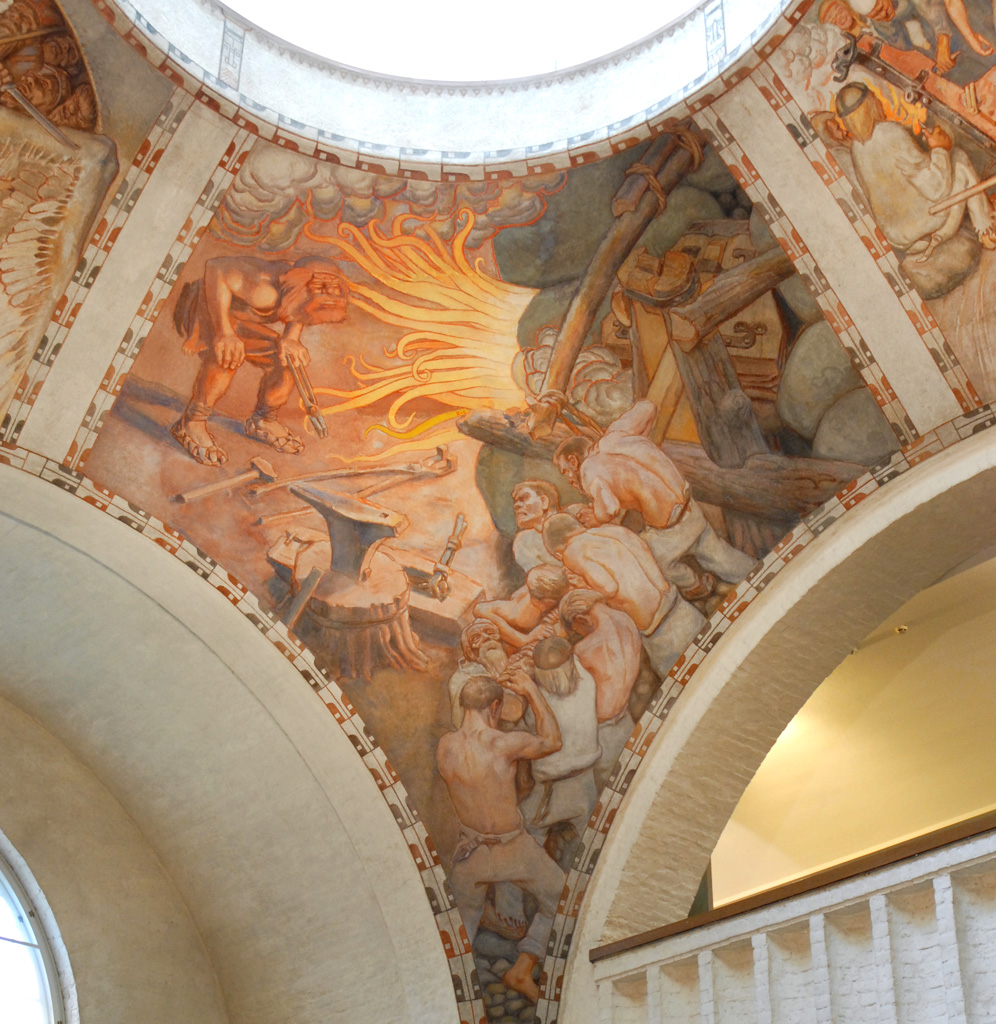
The Forging of the Sampo, fresco in the National Museum of Finland by Akseli Gallen-Kallela, 1928

Ilmarinen works for many days at a mighty forge until he finally succeeds in creating the Sampo:

On one side the flour is grinding,
On another salt is making,
On a third is money forging,
And the lid is many-colored.
Well the Sampo grinds when finished,
To and fro the lid in rocking,
Grinds one measure at the day-break,
Grinds a measure fit for eating,
Grinds a second for the market,
Grinds a third one for the store-house.

Later, Louhi steals the Sampo, and then Ilmarinen and Väinämöinen enter her stronghold in secret and retrieve it. Louhi pursues them and combats Väinämöinen. In the struggle, Louhi is vanquished but the Sampo is destroyed.

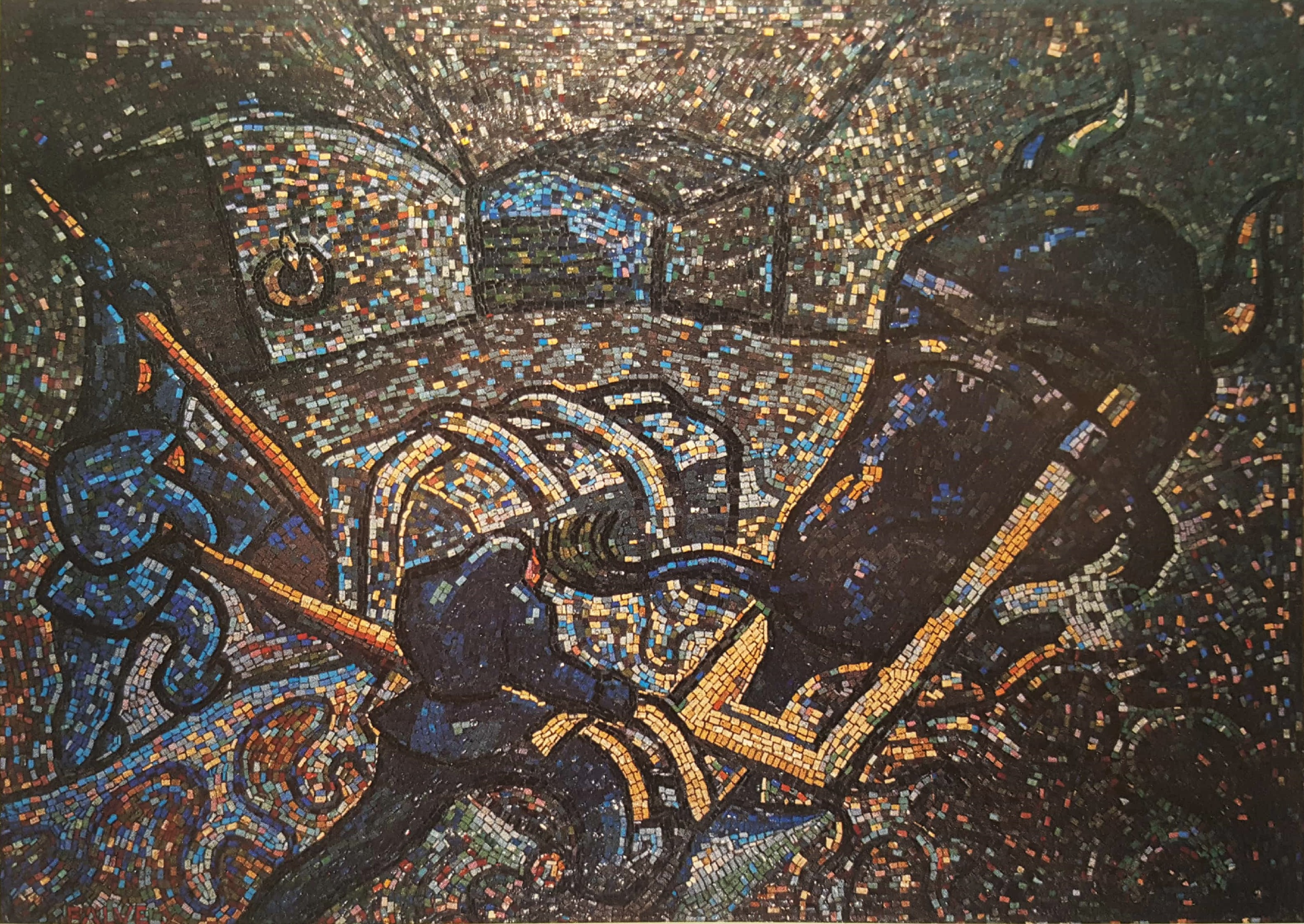
The Retrieval of the Sampo, showing Lemminkäinen ploughing up its roots with a bull. Mosaic by Veikko Aaltona, 1940

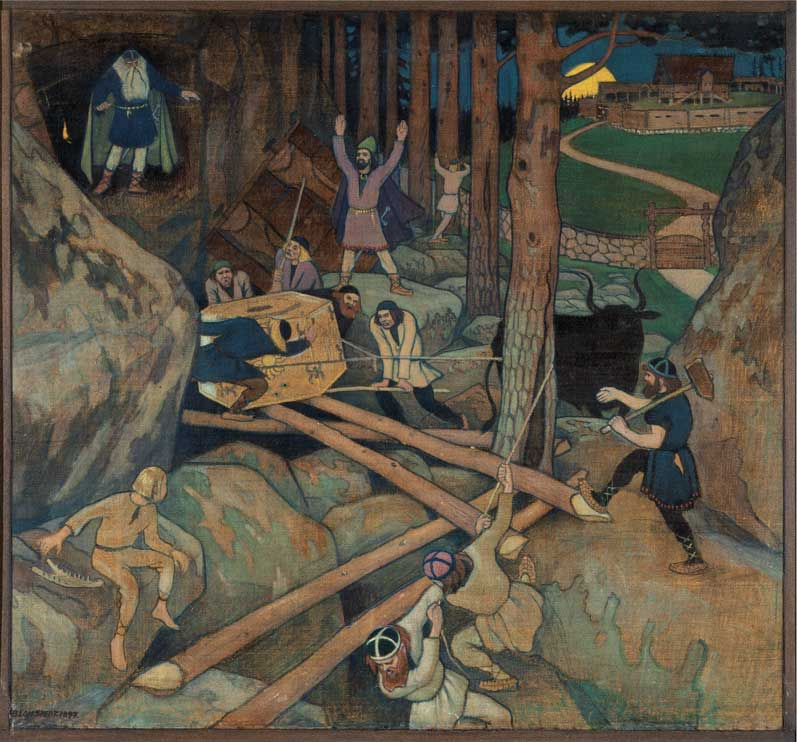
The Theft of the Sampo, Väinö Blomstedt, 1897

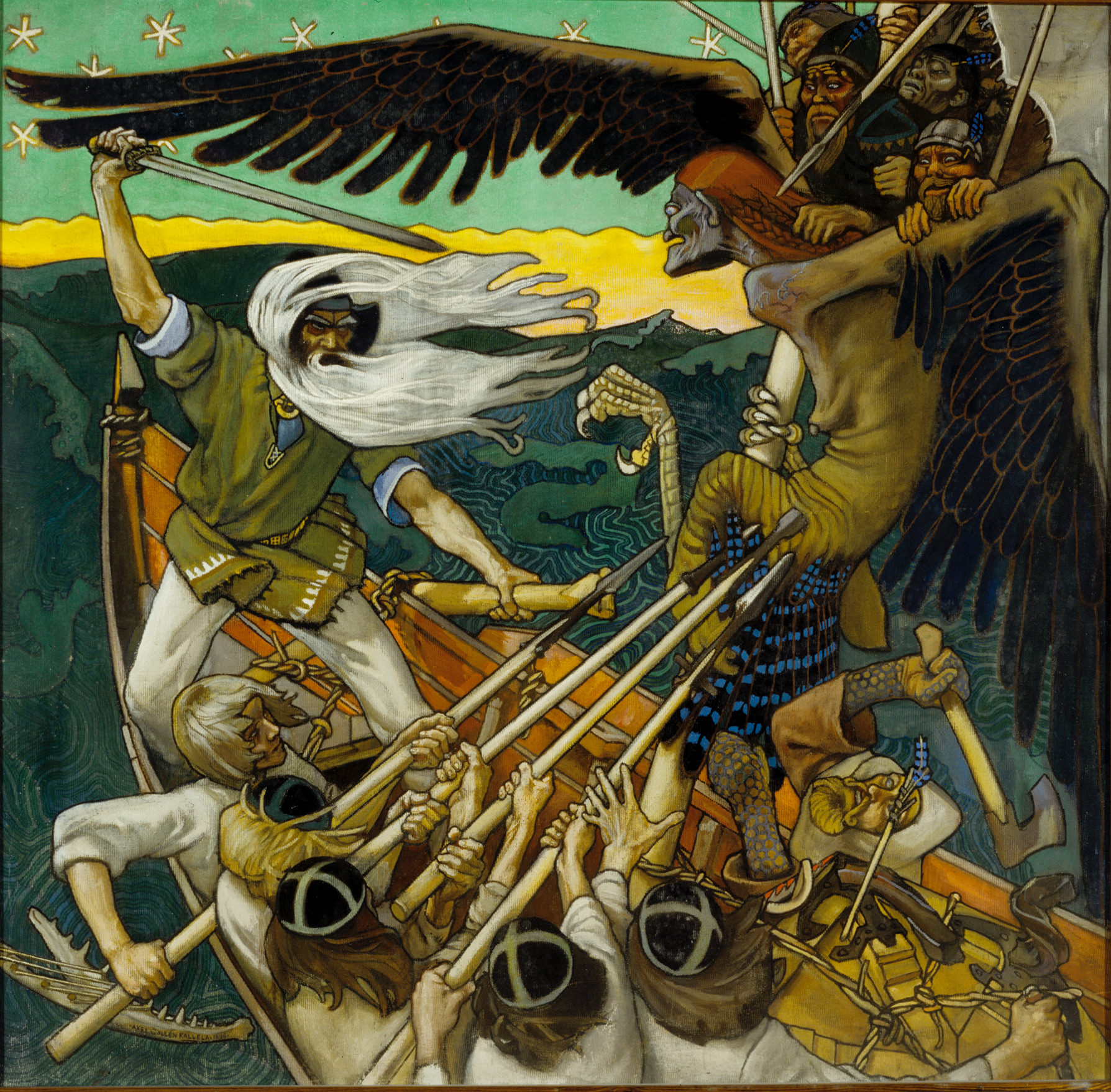
The Defense of the Sampo, Akseli Gallen-Kallela, 1896

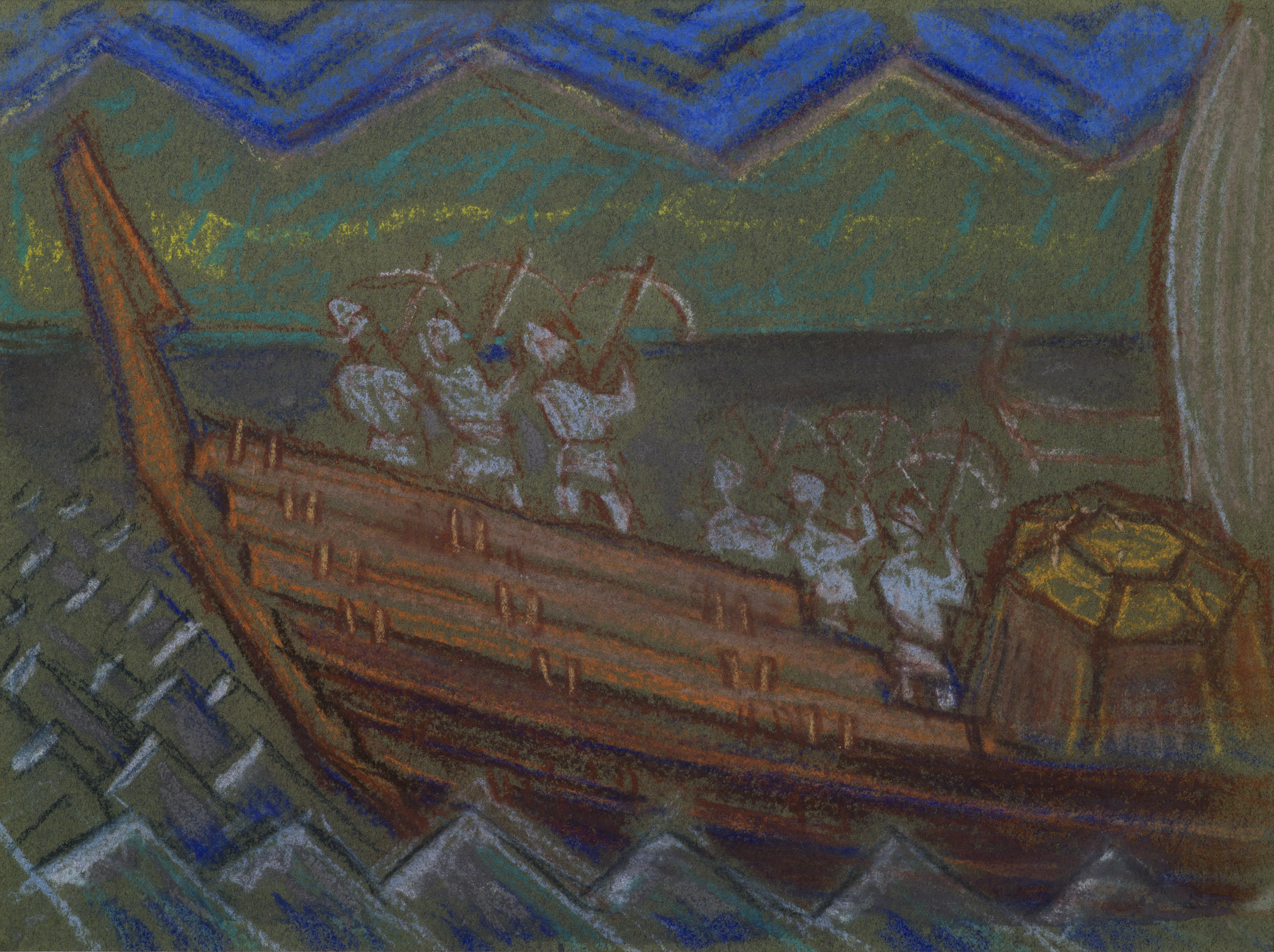
Crossbowmen defending the Sampo, sketch pastel by Akseli Gallen-Kallela, early 20th century

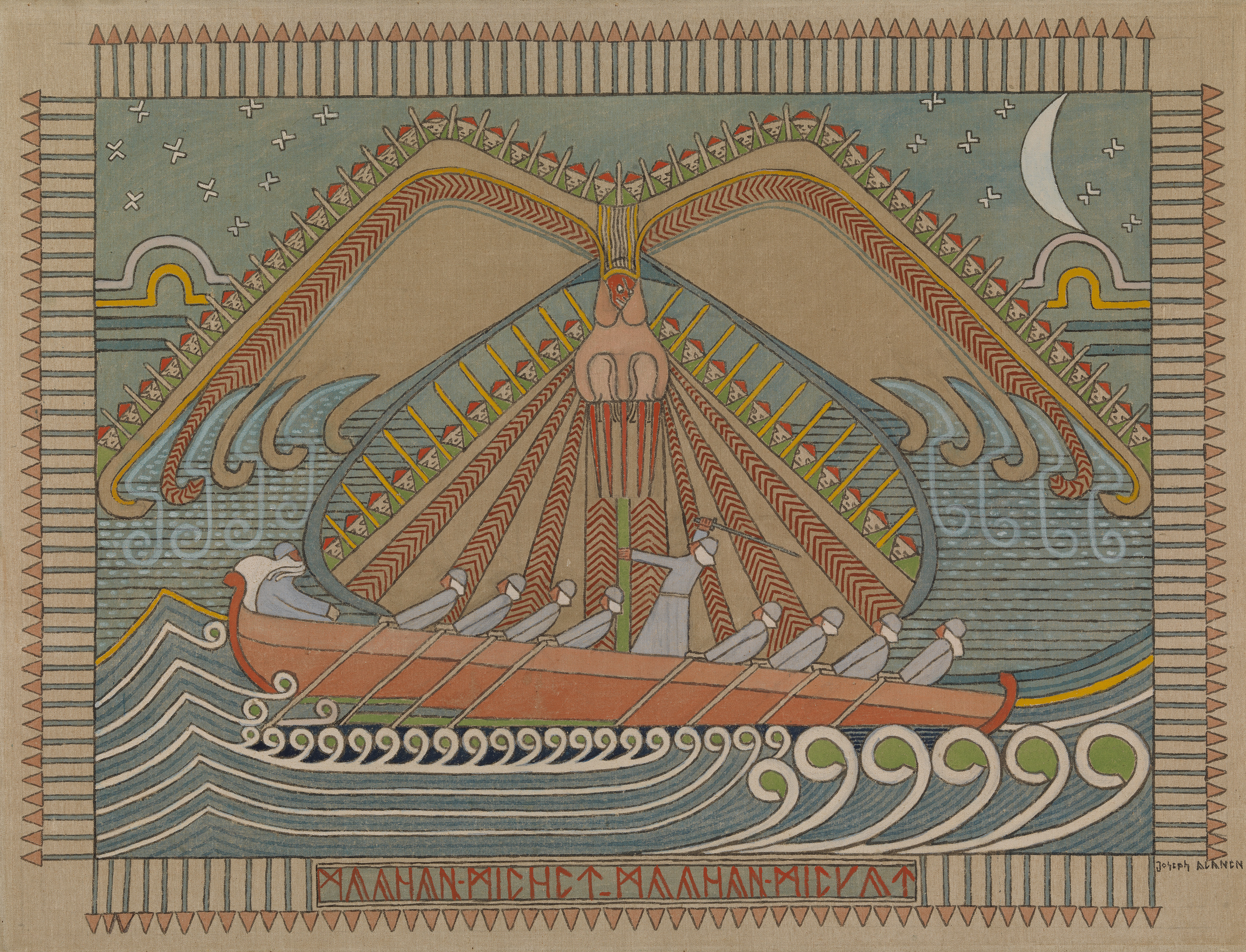
The Defence of the Sampo, Joseph Alanen, 1910–1912

== Similar devices ==
In the Aarne–Thompson classification systems of folktales, tale type 565 refers to a magic mill that continuously produces food or salt. Examples include Why the Sea is Salt (Norway, based on the poem Grottasöngr), Sweet porridge (Germanic), and The Water Mother (Chinese). Such devices have been included into modern tales such as Strega Nona (1975, children's book). Variants on the theme with a cautionary tale and pupil-master relationship include The Master and his Pupil (English), and Goethe's 1797 poem The Sorcerer's Apprentice.

The cornucopia of Greek mythology also produces endless goods, and some versions of the Grail myth emphasize how the Grail creates food and goods.

The Japanese folktale Shiofuki usu speaks of a grindstone that could be used to create anything. Like the Sampo, it too was lost to the sea, endlessly grinding salt.

The Sanskrit epic the Mahabharatha tells of the Akshaya Patra, a vessel or bowl capable of creating food that stops at the end of the day when the lady of the house has had her last meal. Similarly, in the Irish myth of the Cauldron of the Dagda (coire ansic or "un-dry cauldron") is a magical vessel that satisfies any number of people.

== Influences ==
- The 1959 Soviet-Finnish film Sampo is loosely based on the story. An edited English dub, titled The Day The Earth Froze, was featured in a 1993 episode of the film-satirising TV series Mystery Science Theater 3000. The characters repeatedly speculate on the nature of the Sampo and "Sampo!" became a running joke.
- The Finnish TV series Rauta-aika (The Iron Age, 1982), based on Kalevala, has an extended sequence where Ilmarinen and his smiths build the Sampo, which is a Byzantine coin die.
- In The Quest for Kalevala, a Donald Duck story by Disney cartoonist Don Rosa based on the Kalevala, Scrooge McDuck, Donald Duck and Huey, Dewey, and Louie travel to Finland trying to reveal the location of the remains of the Sampo, a mythical machine that can produce gold.
- In 1933, A. A. Öpik named a genus of fossil brachiopod Sampo.
- Asteroid 2091 Sampo is named after the artifact.
- The Finnish heavy metal band Amorphis has a song called Sampo on their 2009 album Skyforger.
- In the indie Rogue-like video game Noita, the player's ultimate goal is to retrieve the Sampo.
- The Finnish symphonic power metal band Amberian Dawn has a song called Sampo on their 2010 album End of Eden.
- The Semantic Computing Group at Aalto University has used Sampo as a generic name for their cultural heritage Web services, most recently BiographySampo (2018).

== See also ==
- Quern-stone
- Cornucopia
- Uchide no kozuchi
- Bag of Holding
