= The Twa Magicians =

Traditional song

"The Twa Magicians", "The Two Magicians", "The Lady and the Blacksmith", or "The Coal Black Smith" (Roud 1350, Child 44) is a British folk song. It first appears in print in 1828 in two sources, Peter Buchan's Ancient Ballads and Songs of the North of Scotland and John Wilson's Noctes Ambrosianae #40. It was later published as number 44 of Francis James Child's English and Scottish Popular Ballads. During the 20th century, versions of it have been recorded by a number of folk and popular musicians.

== Synopsis ==
A blacksmith threatens to deflower (take the virginity of) a lady, who vows to keep herself a maiden. A transformation chase ensues, differing in several variants, but containing such things as she becomes a hare, and he catches her as greyhound, she became a duck and he became either a water dog or a drake. In the Child version of the ballad she does not escape, but in other common renderings, she does.

== Motifs ==
In ballads, the man chasing the woman appears more often in conversation than in fact, when a woman says she will flee, and the man retorts he will chase her, through a variety of forms; these tales are often graceful teasing.

Francis James Child regarded it as derived from one of two fairy tale forms.

In the first, a young man and woman flee an enemy by taking on new forms. This type is Aarne-Thompson type 313, the girl helps the hero flee; instances of it include "Jean, the Soldier, and Eulalie, the Devil's Daughter", "The Grateful Prince", "Foundling-Bird", and "The Two Kings' Children".

In the second, a young man, studying with a sorcerer, flees his master by taking on new forms, which his master counters by equivalent forms. This is Aarne-Thompson type 325, the magician and his pupil; instances include "The Thief and His Master", "Farmer Weathersky", "Master and Pupil", and "Maestro Lattantio and His Apprentice Dionigi".

== Versions ==
The Roud Folksong Index lists 33 examples. though some are duplicates. Apart from earlier Scottish versions there are eight versions collected in the 20th and 21st centuries, five from England, three from Scotland, and one from Kentucky. The earliest was collected by Cecil Sharp in 1905.

== Recordings ==
The song has been recorded (generally under the name "The Two Magicians") by a number of traditional folk artists, including A. L. Lloyd, Ewan MacColl, Martin Carthy, Dave Swarbrick, and John Roberts, as well as folk rock and folk jazz artists such as Galley Beggar, Steeleye Span, Spriguns of Tolgus, Pentangle, and Bellowhead. It is also popular among neofolk artists, and has been recorded by Current 93 (under the name "Oh Coal Black Smith") and Blood Axis. It was the inspiration for the first movement of Märchentänze by Thomas Adès, composed in 2020.

== See also ==
- List of the Child Ballads
- Ceridwen
