= The Sorcerer's Apprentice =

1797 poem by Johann Wolfgang von Goethe

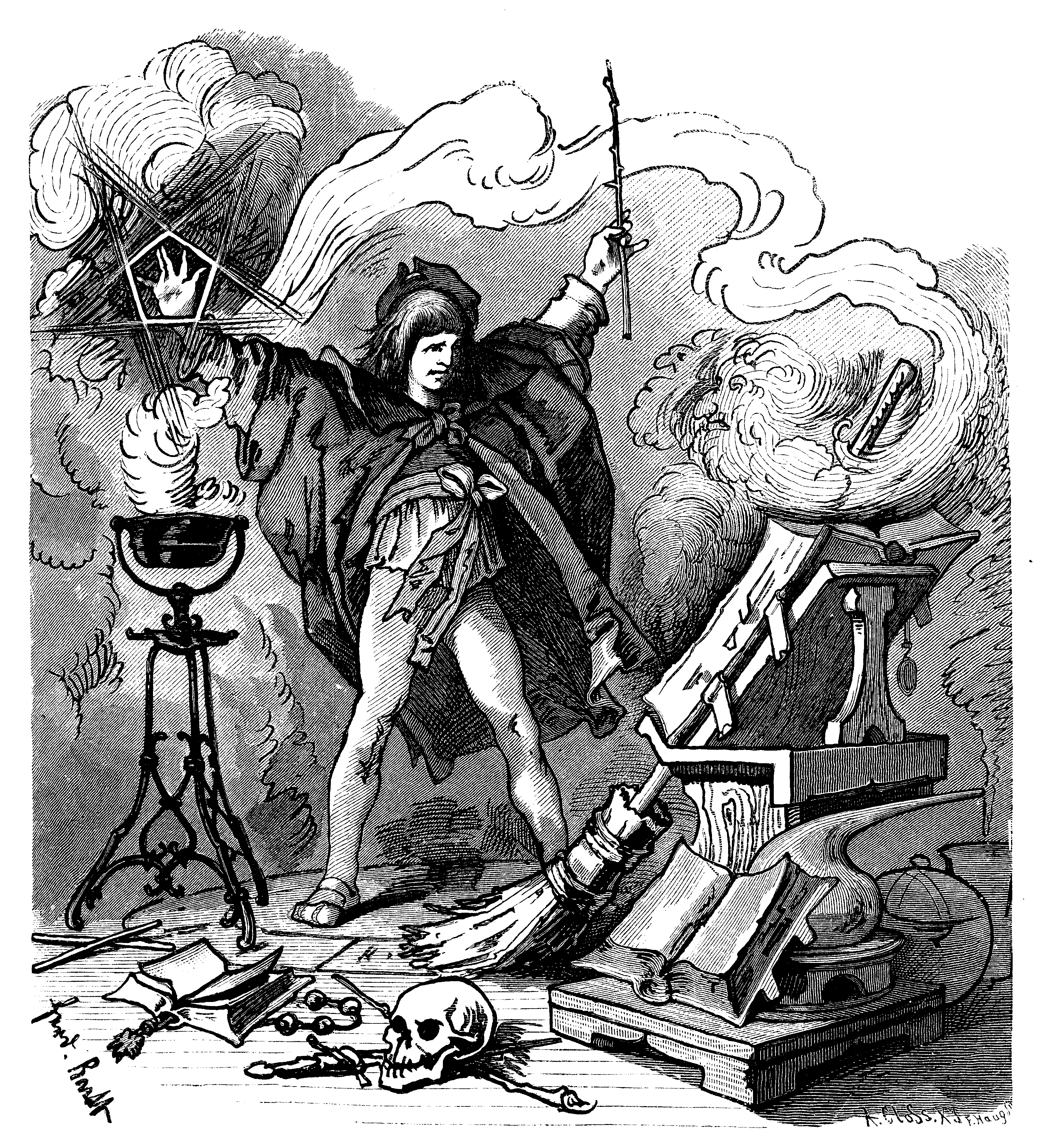
- Illustration from around 1882 by F. Barth

Folk tale
- Name: The Sorcerer's Apprentice
- Also known as: "Der Zauberlehrling"
- Aarne–Thompson grouping: ATU 325 (The Sorcerer's Apprentice; The Magician and his Pupil) and ATU 325* (The Apprentice and the Ghosts)
- Region: Germany
- Published in: "Der Zauberlehrling" (1797), by Johann Wolfgang von Goethe

"The Sorcerer's Apprentice" (German: "Der Zauberlehrling") is a poem by Johann Wolfgang von Goethe written in 1797. The poem is a ballad in 14 stanzas.

== Story ==
The poem begins as an old sorcerer departs his workshop, leaving his apprentice with chores to perform. Tired of fetching water by pail, the apprentice enchants a broom to do the work for him, using magic in which he is not fully trained. The floor is soon awash with water, and the apprentice realizes that he cannot stop the broom because he does not know the magic required to do so.

The apprentice splits the broom in two with an axe, but each piece becomes a whole broom that takes up a pail and continues fetching water, now at twice the speed. At this increased pace, the entire room quickly begins to flood. When all seems lost, the old sorcerer returns and quickly breaks the spell. The poem concludes with the old sorcerer's statement that only a master should invoke powerful spirits.

== German culture ==
Goethe's "Der Zauberlehrling" is well known in the German-speaking world. The lines in which the apprentice implores the returning sorcerer to help him with the mess he created have turned into a cliché, especially the line "Die Geister, die ich rief" ("The spirits that I summoned"), a simplified version of one of Goethe's lines "Die ich rief, die Geister, / Werd' ich nun nicht los" - "The spirits that I summoned / I now cannot rid myself of again", which is often used to describe someone who summons help or allies that the individual cannot control, especially in politics.

== Thematic variations ==
Some versions of the tale differ from Goethe's, and in some versions the sorcerer is angry at the apprentice and in some even expels the apprentice for causing the mess. In other versions, the sorcerer is a bit amused at the apprentice and he simply chides his apprentice about the need to be able to properly control such magic once summoned. The sorcerer's anger with the apprentice, which appears in both the Greek Philopseudes and the Dukas score (and its film adaptation Fantasia), does not appear in Goethe's "Der Zauberlehrling".

== Classical context ==
Lover of Lies (Ancient Greek: Φιλοψευδής, romanized: Philopseudḗs, lit. 'Lover of lies') is a short frame story by Lucian, written c. AD 150. The narrator, Tychiades, is visiting the house of a sick and elderly friend, Eucrates, where he has an argument about the reality of the supernatural. Eucrates and several other visitors tell various tales, intended to convince him that supernatural phenomena are real. Each story in turn is either rebutted or ridiculed by Tychiades.

Eucrates recounts a tale extremely similar to Goethe's "Zauberlehrling", which had supposedly happened to him in his youth. It is, indeed, the oldest known variation of this tale type. There are several differences:

- The sorcerer is instead an Egyptian mystic – a priest of Isis called Pancrates.
- Eucrates is not an apprentice, but a companion who eavesdrops on Pancrates casting his spell.
- Although a broom is listed as one of the items that can be animated by the spell, Eucrates actually uses a pestle. (Pancrates also sometimes used the bar of a door.)

== Adaptations ==
=== Dukas symphonic poem ===
In 1897, Paul Dukas wrote a symphonic tone poem based on the story from Goethe's poem. This piece was popularized by its use as one of eight animated shorts based on Western classical music in the 1940 Walt Disney animated film Fantasia. In the piece, which retains the title "The Sorcerer's Apprentice", Mickey Mouse plays the apprentice, and the story follows Goethe's original closely, except that Mickey splinters the broom into countless pieces, and the sorcerer (Yen Sid, which is Disney spelled backwards) is stern and angry with him afterward. Fantasia popularized Goethe's story to a worldwide audience. The segment proved so popular that it was repeated, in its original form, in the sequel Fantasia 2000. Four of the animated brooms have a brief cameo appearance in the 1988 film Who Framed Roger Rabbit, working at cleaning a film studio while a human supervisor plays a saxophone version of Dukas' composition.

=== Literary adaptations ===
17th-century French author Eustace le Noble wrote a literary variant of this type of tale with L'apprenti magicien.

Other literary adaptations of the tale include several fiction and nonfiction books, such as the novel The Sorcerer's Apprentice (1910) by Hanns Heinz Ewers, and Christopher Bulis's novel The Sorcerer's Apprentice (1995) based on the TV series Doctor Who. Nonfiction books with this title include The Sorcerer's Apprentice: A Journey Through Africa (1948) by Elspeth Huxley, and the travel book Sorcerer's Apprentice (1998) by Tahir Shah.

Karl Marx and Friedrich Engels alluded to Goethe's poem in The Communist Manifesto (1848), comparing modern bourgeois society to "the sorcerer who is no longer able to control the powers of the nether world whom he has called up by his spells."

=== Film and popular culture ===
"The Sorcerer's Apprentice" is a 1962 episode of Alfred Hitchcock Presents featuring Brandon deWilde as mentally-troubled youth Hugo, coveting the magic wand of a kindly magician.

"Top Secret Apprentice", a segment of the Tiny Toon Adventures episode broadcast in 1991, is a modern version of the story, with Buster Bunny messing around with Bugs Bunny's cartoon scenery machine and getting into trouble.

The 2010 film The Sorcerer's Apprentice features a scene based on the Fantasia conception of Goethe's poem. The Fantasia variant also appears in the video game series Kingdom Hearts, with the sorcerer Yen Sid serving as an adviser to Sora and Riku. Symphony of Sorcery, a world based on Fantasia, appears in Kingdom Hearts 3D: Dream Drop Distance.

The poem's story is alluded to in several episodes of the fairy-tale drama Once Upon a Time, especially in "The Apprentice" (2014). A variation of the Dukas piece also plays in certain scenes. The apprentice himself is a recurring character, while the sorcerer is shown to be Merlin.

The Magic: The Gathering playing card Sorcerer's Broom from Throne of Eldraine references the story and the replicating nature of the broom.

A live musical stage adaption, written by Richard Hough and Alexander S Bermange, will make its world debut at HOME in Manchester, England, in November 2026.

== See also ==
=== In mythology ===
- Midas
- Golem
- Abhimanyu in Chakravyuha in the Mahabharata
- The Sañjīva Jātaka story about the boastful pupil who is killed by the tiger he brought to life with a spell, without yet being taught the counter-spell by his teacher.

=== In folk and fairy tales ===
- "Maestro Lattantio and His Apprentice Dionigi"
- "The Master and his Pupil"
- "The Thief and His Master"
- "Sweet Porridge"
- "The Magic Book"
- "Farmer Weathersky"
- Faust
- Krabat

=== In literature ===
- Strega Nona
- Frankenstein
- "The Monkey's Paw"
- The Man Who Could Work Miracles (and numerous other works by H. G. Wells)

=== Other ===
- Sorcerer's Apprentice syndrome
- "Sweet Porridge"
- "The Master and his Pupil"
