= Strega Nona =

Book by Tomie dePaola

- Cover with correct "an original tale..." subtitle
- Author: Tomie dePaola
- Original title: Strega Nonna
- Illustrator: Tomie dePaola
- Cover artist: Tomie dePaola
- Language: English
- Genre: Children's book
- Published: 1975
- Publisher: Prentice Hall, New Jersey
- Publication place: United States of America
- Media type: Print (hardcover)
- ISBN: 0138516006
- LC Class: PZ8.1.D43 St

Strega Nona is a children's picture book written and illustrated by Tomie dePaola. It concerns Strega Nona and her helper, Big Anthony. The book, which is likely dePaola's best-known work, was published in 1975 and won a Caldecott honor in 1976. It was one of the "Top 100 Picture Books" of all time in a 2012 poll by School Library Journal. Strega Nona has been challenged or removed from some children's libraries in the United States because it depicts magic and witchcraft in a positive light.

== Plot ==
Strega Nona is a wise woman and witch doctor who lives in Calabria, in southern Italy. Because she is getting old, Strega Nona employs a young man named Big Anthony to do household chores. One night, Big Anthony observes Strega Nona singing to her magic pasta pot to produce large amounts of pasta, but he fails to notice that she blows three kisses to the pot to stop the pasta production.

Big Anthony shares his discovery with the townsfolk the next day, but he is laughed at. Two days later, while Strega Nona is visiting her friend Strega Amelia, Big Anthony sings to the pasta pot and successfully conjures up large amounts of pasta, which he serves to the townsfolk. Since Big Anthony cannot stop the pot from cooking, however, the pasta gradually covers Strega Nona's house and nearly floods the entire town. Disaster is averted when Strega Nona returns and immediately blows the three kisses to stop the pot's cooking; she punishes Big Anthony by making him eat all of the pasta.

== Development ==
Detail of title page of an early printing with incorrect "an old tale retold..." subtitle

Although the cover and title page of early printings of the book stated that Strega Nona is "an old tale retold and illustrated by Tomie dePaola", in truth dePaola invented the character and the story himself. He wrote the words "Strega Nona" next to a doodle of a woman's head he drew in the early 1970s and later made her the main character in his story based on the Sweet Porridge fairy tale. Later printings of the book bear the accurate subtitle "an original tale written and illustrated by Tomie dePaola".

In the Italian language, the word "strega" means "witch" and the word "nonna" means "grandmother". Therefore, the name "Strega Nona" means "Grandma Witch", though the accurate Italian rendering would be "Nonna Strega", with the words reversed and "Nonna" spelled with a double "n". While in standard Italian the word "nona" (with a single "n") would mean "ninth", it is also a common dialectal form for grandma, particularly used in northern regions. The book Strega Nona: Her Story reveals that Nona is the character's actual name, which dePaola has confirmed on his website.

When considered as modern folklore, the story has been categorised as an Aarne-Thompson type 565, the Magic Mill.

== Other books ==
Strega Nona and Big Anthony also appear in other books by dePaola, including:

- Big Anthony and the Magic Ring (1979): Introduces Bambolona, "the baker's daughter".
- Strega Nona's Magic Lessons (1982): Big Anthony disguises himself as a girl and takes magic lessons from Strega Nona, who is also teaching Bambolona.
- Merry Christmas, Strega Nona (1986): Strega Nona abandons her usual pursuits in order to prepare a Christmas dinner for the entire town.
- Strega Nona Meets Her Match (1993): Her friend Strega Amelia sets up a modern cure shop which competes with Strega Nona's cure shop.
- Strega Nona: Her Story (1996): Covers Strega Nona's life, telling the readers about how she got the magic pasta pot, learned her magic (it all came from the help of her grandmother, Grandma Concetta), became friends with Strega Amelia and met Big Anthony.
- Big Anthony: His Story (1998): Tells of Big Anthony's life since childhood and how his family noticed that Big Anthony simply does not pay attention. Upon leaving, he travels to Pisa, Florence, Rome and Naples before meeting Strega Nona.
- Strega Nona Takes a Vacation (2000): Strega Nona goes on vacation and sends gifts of candy and bubble baths to Bambolona and Big Anthony.
- Brava, Strega Nona!: A Heartwarming Pop-Up Book (2008): Strega Nona gives advice about life.
- Strega Nona's Harvest (2009): Strega Nona teaches Big Anthony about gardening and the importance of order.
- Strega Nona's Gift (2011): Concerns Italian holiday traditions.
- Strega Nona Does It Again (2013): Strega Nona has the perfect remedy for a houseguest who overstays her welcome.

== Other media ==
- Weston Woods Studios produced on January 1, 1977, a short animated film entitled Strega Nonna based on the book, directed by Gene Deitch and narrated by Peter Hawkins (in the English version) and Eduard Cupák (in the Czech version).
- Thomas Olson and Roberta Carlson adapted Strega Nona, Big Anthony and the Magic Ring, and Strega Nona Her Story as Strega Nona The Musical for the 1986–1987 season of the Children's Theatre Company in Minneapolis. The musical, which went on tour, was also known as "Tomie dePaola's Strega Nona".
- In 1989, Strega Nona was adapted into an audiobook narrated by Dom DeLuise.
- Strega Nona, Bambolona, and Big Anthony appeared as supporting characters in the 2001 television series Telling Stories with Tomie dePaola where they were performed by Bill Barretta, Julianne Buescher, and John Kennedy, respectively.
- In 2023, the United States Postal Service issued a U.S. postage stamp featuring Strega Nona.

== See also ==
- The Sorcerer's Apprentice
- Sweet Porridge
- Why the Sea is Salt
- The Master and his Pupil
- The Water Mother
- Bless Me, Ultima
