= Akshaya Patra =

Legendary vessel in Hinduism

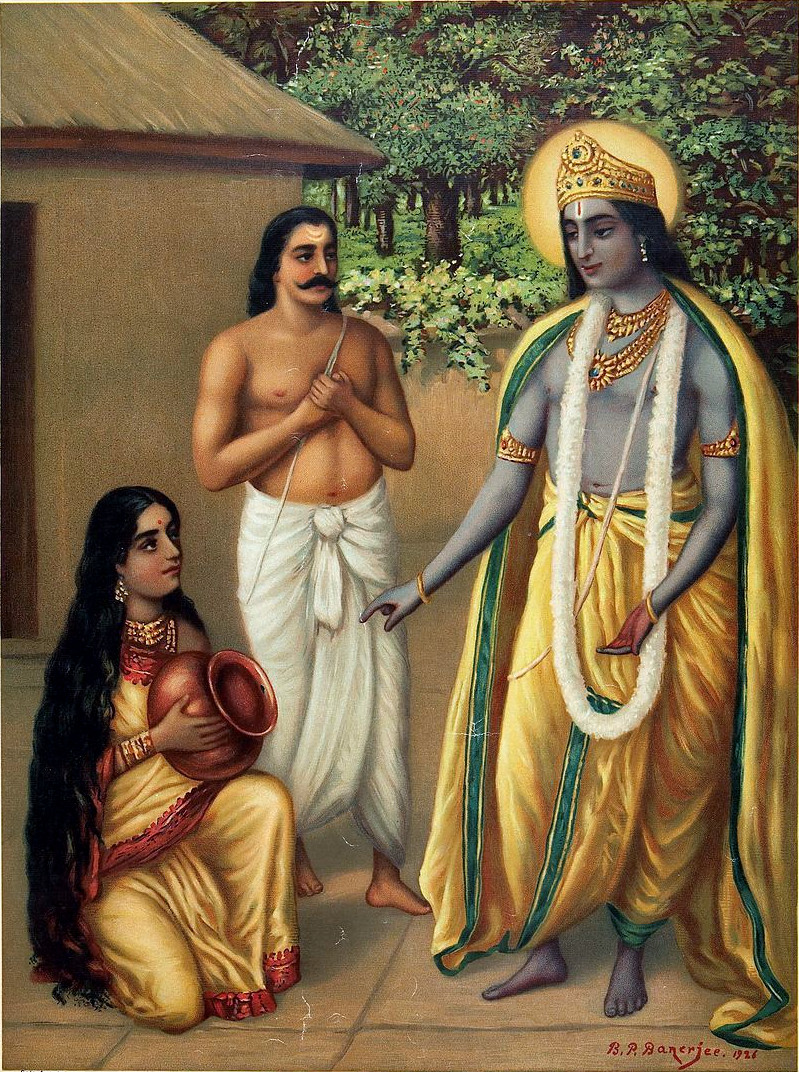
Krishna offers Draupadi the divine vessel

Akshaya Patra (Sanskrit: अक्षयपात्र, romanized: Akṣayapātra, lit. 'inexhaustible vessel') is a legendary copper vessel featured in the Hindu epic Mahabharata. It is a divine vessel given to Yudhishthira by Surya (or Krishna in some versions), which offered a never-depleting supply of food to the Pandavas every day.

== Legend ==
When the Pandavas were in exile in the forest, they received visits from many dignitaries, sages, kings, and ministers who were horrified at the turn of events. They came to discuss matters with the Pandavas and show their support. Draupadi found it very difficult to extend the customary hospitality to these numerous guests because the Pandavas were destitute in exile and living in the forest where nothing was available. Yudhishthira prayed to the god Surya, who blessed him the Akshaya Patra, the inexhaustible vessel. Other version mentions different story, Draupadi started to pray to Krishna. Pleased with Draupadi's prayers, Krishna blessed her with the Akshaya Patra, a vessel that continually provides unlimited food every day, ceasing only once Draupadi, herself, had finished eating for the day.

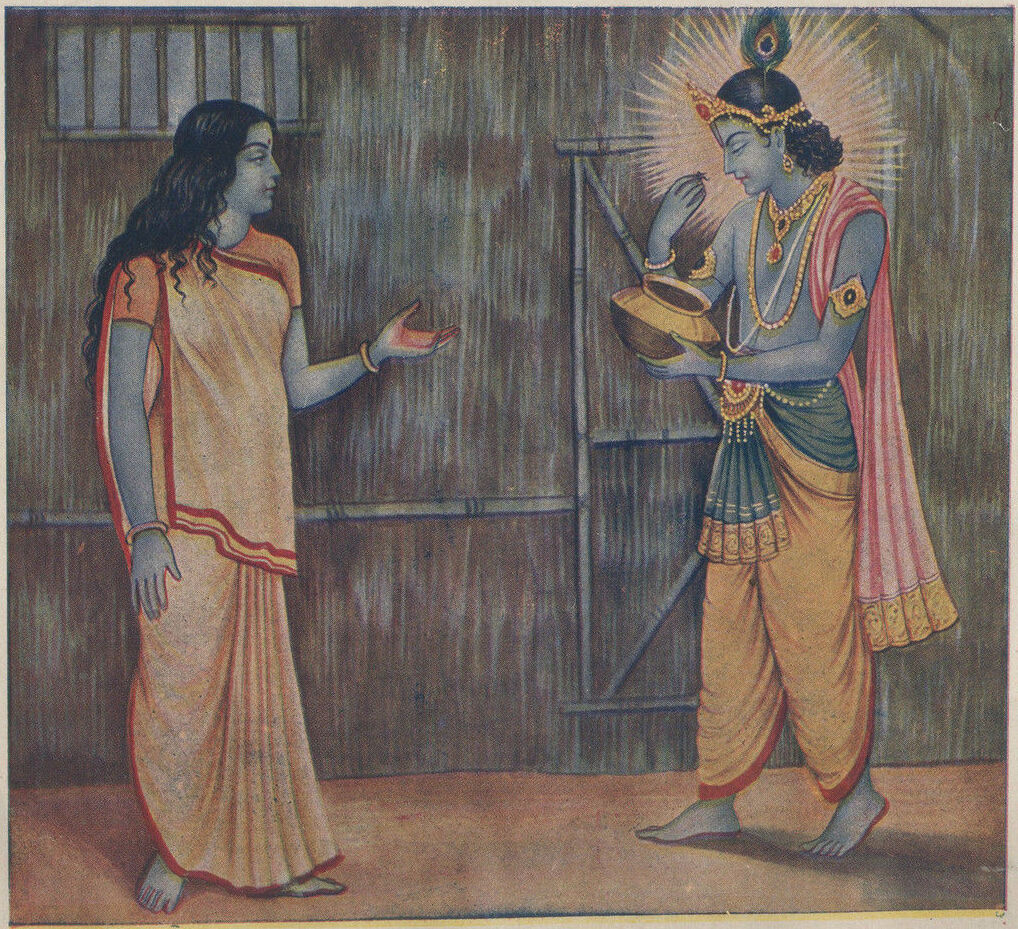
Krishna eating from the Akshaya Patra in front of Draupadi - Indian Print 1948

During the Pandavas' exile, Durvasa and several disciples arrived at Hastinapura. Duryodhana, with his maternal uncle, Shakuni, managed to gratify the sage. Durvasa was pleased enough to grant him a boon. Duryodhana, secretly wanting Durvasa to curse the Pandavas in anger, asked the sage to visit his cousins in the forest after Draupadi had eaten her meal, knowing that the Pandavas would then have nothing to feed him.

So, Durvasa and his disciples visited the Pandavas in their hermitage in the forest, as per Duryodhana's request. During this period of exile, the Pandavas would obtain their food by means of the Akshaya Patra, which would become exhausted each day once Draupadi finished her meal. Because Draupadi had already eaten by the time Durvasa arrived that day, there was no food left to serve him, and the Pandavas were very anxious as to their fate should they fail to feed such a venerable sage. While Durvasa and his disciples were away bathing at the river, Draupadi prayed to Krishna for help. Krishna immediately appeared before Draupadi saying he was extremely hungry, and asked her for food. Draupadi grew exasperated, and said that she had prayed to Krishna precisely because she had no food left to give. Krishna then told her to bring the Akshaya Patra to him. When she did, he partook of the lone grain of rice and a piece of vegetable that he found stuck to the vessel, and announced that he was satisfied by the "meal". This satiated the hunger of Durvasa and his disciples, as the satisfaction of Krishna (portrayed here as the Supreme Being who pervades the entire universe) meant the satiation of the hunger of all living things. The sage Durvasa and his disciples then quietly left after their bath, without returning to the Pandavas' hermitage, for they were afraid of facing what they thought would be the Pandavas' wrathful reaction at their impolite behaviour of refusing the food that would be served to them.

== See also ==
- Kamadhenu
- Cornucopia
- Sampo
