= Master and Pupil =

Danish fairy tale

"Master and Pupil" is a Danish fairy tale. Andrew Lang included it in The Pink Fairy Book.

It is Aarne-Thompson type 325, "The Magician and His Pupil".

== Synopsis ==
A boy trying to get himself hired is asked by a man if he can read, even though his duties would only be to dust the man's books. The boy replies that he can, and the man rejects him. The boy runs ahead of the man and asks again for a job, this time successfully after claiming that he cannot read. The boy is set to work and surreptitiously reads the books while dusting them. As his master is a wizard, the boy's reading teaches him some magic and he is then able to transform into any animal.

Later, the boy runs away and returns to his parents where he assists them by turning into a horse, being sold by his father, turning back into a boy, and escaping back to his parents.

The wizard hears about this and goes to the father to buy the boy/horse. He then attempts to have a red-hot nail driven into the horse's mouth, as this will stop the transformation. The boy turns into a dove to escape but the wizard turns himself into a hawk to chase him. Then the boy transforms into a gold ring and drops into a girl's lap. The wizard attempts to purchase the ring but the girl refuses as it has fallen from heaven. The wizard continues to offer ever increasing amounts of money until the boy, in fear, transforms into a grain of barley. The wizard turns into a hen intending to eat the boy, but the grain changes into a polecat which then bites the hen's head off.

The polecat then transforms back into the boy who marries the girl and does no more magic.

== Commentary ==
While "Farmer Weathersky" and "The Thief and His Master" include the transformation chase of a pupil from his master, in those tales, the boy is actually a pupil, and not learning on the sly as in this one.

== See also ==
- The Magic Book
- Maestro Lattantio and His Apprentice Dionigi
