= The Thief and His Master =

German fairy tale

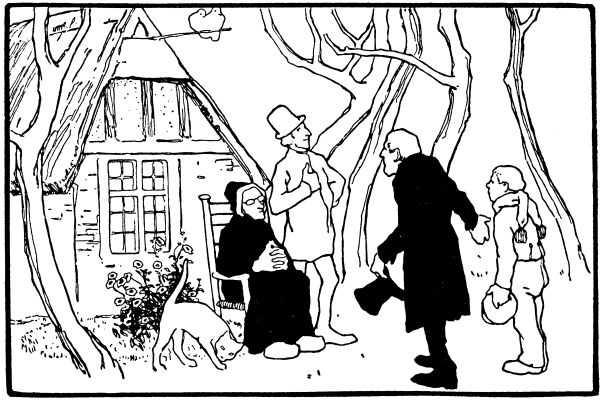

Folk tale
- Name: The Thief and His Master
- Aarne–Thompson grouping: ATU 325
- Country: Germany
- Published in: Grimms' Fairy Tales

"The Thief and His Master" is a German fairy tale (original title: "De Gaudeif un sien Meester") collected by the Brothers Grimm in Grimm's Fairy Tales as tale number 68. In the first edition (published on 20 December 1812) there was another fairy tale at place 68. The name of the fairy tale is "Von dem Sommer- und Wintergarten".

It is Aarne–Thompson type 325, The Magician and His Pupil, containing a transformation chase. Others of this type include Farmer Weathersky, The Sorcerer's Apprentice and Master and Pupil. This tale type is well known in India and Europe and notably stable in form. A literary variant is Maestro Lattantio and His Apprentice Dionigi.

== Synopsis ==
Jan wants his son to learn a profession and visits a church to ask the Lord what profession would be good for him. The sexton behind the altar says "steal, steal" and Jan tells his son that he should learn to steal. They search for a suitable tutor and discover a small house inhabited by an old woman deep inside a large forest. Jan apprentices his son to a master-thief living there, who tells Jan that he would not charge anything for tutoring him for a year, but if at the end of the year Jan cannot recognize his son, he would have to pay a heavy fee.

When he returns after a year, a helpful dwarf advises him to bring bread, and that the little bird peeping from the basket he finds there would be his son. On a tree, there is a little bird that turns out to be Jan's son. Jan throws the bread at the bird and they talk to each other. The master thief says that Jan has been helped by the devil, otherwise he could never have recognized his son.

On the way back they come across a carriage and the son changes himself to a dog. The man in the carriage wants to pay for the beautiful dog and his father sells him. Moments later, the dog jumps out of the window of the carriage and changes his shape. The son escapes and goes back to his father.

They go home and the next day they go to the market in the neighboring village. The son then changed himself to a horse, warning his father not to sell him with the bridle, his father sells him to the master-thief without taking off the bridle. When the master-thief stables him, he asks the maid to take off the bridle and she is so surprised that he talks that she does so. The son and the master-thief interchange a transformation chase — first sparrows, then fish — with throwing lots, and the son ends it by turning into a fox when the master is a cock and biting its head off.

== See also ==
- The Magic Book
