= 2091 Sampo =

Main-belt asteroid

Discovery
- Discovered by: Y. Väisälä
- Discovery site: Turku Obs.
- Discovery date: 26 April 1941

Designations
- Named after: Sampo (Finnish mythology)
- Alternative designations: 1941 HO · 1931 MG; 1938 UF_{1} · 1951 GA_{1} 1952 LB · 1956 EP; 1971 BH_{1} · 1978 NB; A924 BB
- Minor planet category: main-belt · (outer); Eos

Orbital characteristics
- Epoch 4 September 2017 (JD 2458000.5)
- Uncertainty parameter 0
- Observation arc: 93.06 yr (33,989 days)
- Aphelion: 3.1985 AU
- Perihelion: 2.8300 AU
- Semi-major axis: 3.0143 AU
- Eccentricity: 0.0611
- Orbital period (sidereal): 5.23 yr (1,911 days)
- Mean anomaly: 359.61°
- Mean motion: 0° 11^{m} 17.88^{s} / day
- Inclination: 11.378°
- Longitude of ascending node: 114.53°
- Argument of perihelion: 318.84°

Physical characteristics
- Dimensions: 23.024±0.474 km 23.493±0.240 km 30.25 km (derived); 30.48±1.3 km 35.47±0.45 km
- Synodic rotation period: 71.34±0.05 h
- Geometric albedo: 0.118±0.003; 0.1218 (derived); 0.1582±0.014; 0.2683±0.0325; 0.277±0.019
- Spectral type: S
- Absolute magnitude (H): 10.2 · 10.5

2091 Sampo (provisional designation 1941 HO), is a stony Eos asteroid and relatively slow rotator from the outer region of the asteroid belt, approximately 30 kilometers in diameter. It was discovered on 26 April 1941, by Finnish astronomer Yrjö Väisälä at Turku Observatory, Finland, and named after Sampo from Finnish mythology.

== Orbit and classification ==
Sampo is a member of the Eos family (606), the largest asteroid family in the outer main belt consisting of nearly 10,000 asteroids. It orbits the Sun in at a distance of 2.8–3.2 AU once every 5 years and 3 months (1,911 days). Its orbit has an eccentricity of 0.06 and an inclination of 11° with respect to the ecliptic.

== Physical characteristics ==
The S-type asteroid measures between 23.0 and 35.5 kilometers in diameter, and its surface has an albedo between 0.118 and 0.277, according to the surveys carried out by IRAS, Akari, and NEOWISE.

A rotational lightcurve of Sampo was obtained from photometric observations made by astronomers René Roy, Laurent Bernasconi and Stéphane Charbonnelat in March 2003. It gave a potentially long rotation period of 71.34±0.05 hours with a brightness variation of 0.38 magnitude (U=2).

== Naming ==
This minor planet was named after the wonder-object Sampo from Finnish mythology. It is mentioned in the national oral folklore and mythology epic, Kalevala, after which the minor planet 1454 Kalevala is named. Sampo was to produce every kind of fortune. When Kalevala and Pohjola (also see 3606 Pohjola) were fighting for its possession it broke into pieces. The official naming citation was published by the Minor Planet Center on 1 August 1980 (M.P.C. 5450).
