= Maestro Lattantio and His Apprentice Dionigi =

Italian literary fairy tale

Maestro Lattantio and His Apprentice Dionigi is an Italian literary fairy tale written by Giovanni Francesco Straparola in The Facetious Nights of Straparola.

This tale plays off a long tradition of conflict between apprentices and their masters; a common oral folktale is such a conflict, where the master is instructing in either magic or theft. One such oral variant is The Thief and His Master.

== Synopsis ==
In Sicily, in the town of Messina, Maestro Lattantio had learned to be both a magician and a tailor. He took an apprentice, Dionigi, to teach to be a tailor, but Dionigi spied on him and lost all interest in being a tailor because of his desire to learn magic. Lattantio sent him away, but his father sent him back, where Lattantio often punished him for his laziness, but Dionigi bore it because he could watch Lattantio secretly and learn his magic. One day, his father found him doing housework rather than learning to be a tailor, and brought him home, grieved that after his money was spent, his son had not learned a trade.

Dionigi turned himself into a horse, and had his father display him for sale. Lattantio saw it and realized that it was Dionigi. He changed himself into a merchant and bought the horse. The father would not sell the bridle, but Lattantio increased his price until the father agreed. Lattantio then took the horse home and mistreated it. His two daughters pitied the horse and were kind to it. One day, they took it down to the stream to drink, where it dashed into the water and became a little fish. Lattantio, finding the horse gone, got his daughters to tell him what had happened, and turned himself into a tunny to chase Dionigi. Dionigi swam near the shore, and jumped into a basket carried by a handmaiden of the king's daughter, turning himself into a ruby ring. Violante, the king's daughter, found the ring and put it on. At night, when she went to bed, he changed into his own form, prevented her from screaming, and explained his plight; she promised to help him as long as he respected her honor. She kept him as a ring by day, and at night would talk with him in human form.

The king fell ill. Lattantio came and cured him, asking the princess's ring as his reward. The king summoned Violante, with orders to bring all her jewels, but Violante left behind the ring. Lattantio realized it was missing and said she could find it. She returned to her room and wept over the ring. Dionigi told her that the man was his enemy, and that she should bring the ring and when giving it, throw it against the wall as if in a temper. When she was finally compelled to bring the ring, she did as he had asked, and the ring became a pomegranate that, when it hit the floor, scattered seeds. Lattantio became a rooster and ate the seeds to put an end to Dionigi, but one seed hid out of his reach, and when it had a chance, turned to a fox and bit off the rooster's head. Dionigi told the king the story and with his consent married Violante.

== See also ==
- The Sorcerer's Apprentice
- Farmer Weathersky
- The Magic Book
- Master and Pupil
