= The Magic Book =

Danish fairy tale

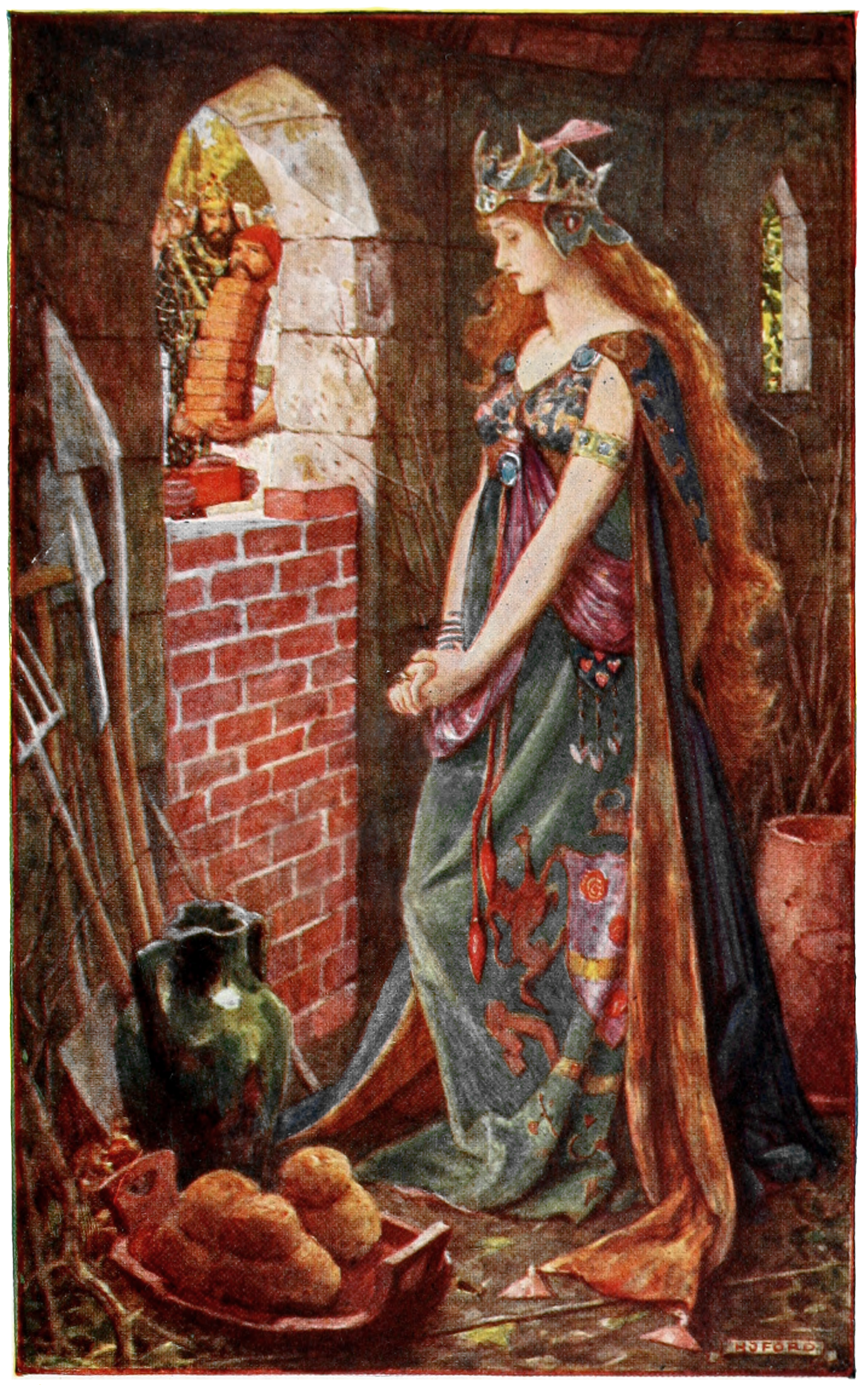

The Magic Book is a Danish fairy tale collected by Evald Tang Kristensen in Eventyr fra Jylland ("Adventures From Jutland.") Andrew Lang included it in The Orange Fairy Book, listing it as translated by Mrs. Skavgaard-Pedersen.

== Synopsis ==
A boy called set out to seek service. He was rude to an old man, refusing to give up the way, but entered his service. The old man set him to keep some rooms clean and scatter sand on the floor, told him where to find food and let him wear clothing that was there, and forbade him to enter one room. The boy immediately cleaned nothing but his own room, and then, after some days, went into the room. He found a heap of bones and some books; he took one book, found it was magical, and learned shapeshifting from it. He ran away to home, but his father thought he had stolen the fine clothing and sent him off. The boy told him to sell the dog he would find by the door the next day, but be sure to take the strap back. The dog appeared, and at his wife's insistence, the father sold it and kept the strap. When the boy appeared again, his father still would not admit him. The boy told him to sell a cow that would appear the next day, and to the king, but he must take its halter and come back by the forest. The cow appeared, and the man sold it, but when the butcher went to kill it, it turned to a dove and flew off. The king sent men after the man, but he had gone by the forest, and they did not find him.

The father would still not accept his son. The next day, it was a horse, but because the buyer offered as much for the bridle as for the horse, the father sold it as well. The old man led the horse off to have it shod. The smith offered him a drink first, and the horse persuaded a servant maid to free him. He turned to a dove and flew off. The old man pursued as a hawk, but the boy turned into a gold ring and fell before the princess, and she took him up. He turned into a man alone with her, and they met often for a long time. One day, the king saw him, and had his daughter shut up in a tower. But the princess and the boy fell through a tunnel there, to a golden castle, and when the king opened the tower for the funeral, there were no bodies. He sent a soldier down it. The soldier told them that the king was sorry. The boy went back to him, disguised as a king, and asked what should be done to a king who had buried his daughter alive for loving a peasant. The king said that he should be burned and his ashes scattered. The boy told him that he was the man, but pardoned him, and the wedding was held.

== See also ==
- Master and Pupil
- Farmer Weathersky
- The Thief and His Master
- Maestro Lattantio and His Apprentice Dionigi
