= Farmer Weathersky =

Norwegian fairy tale

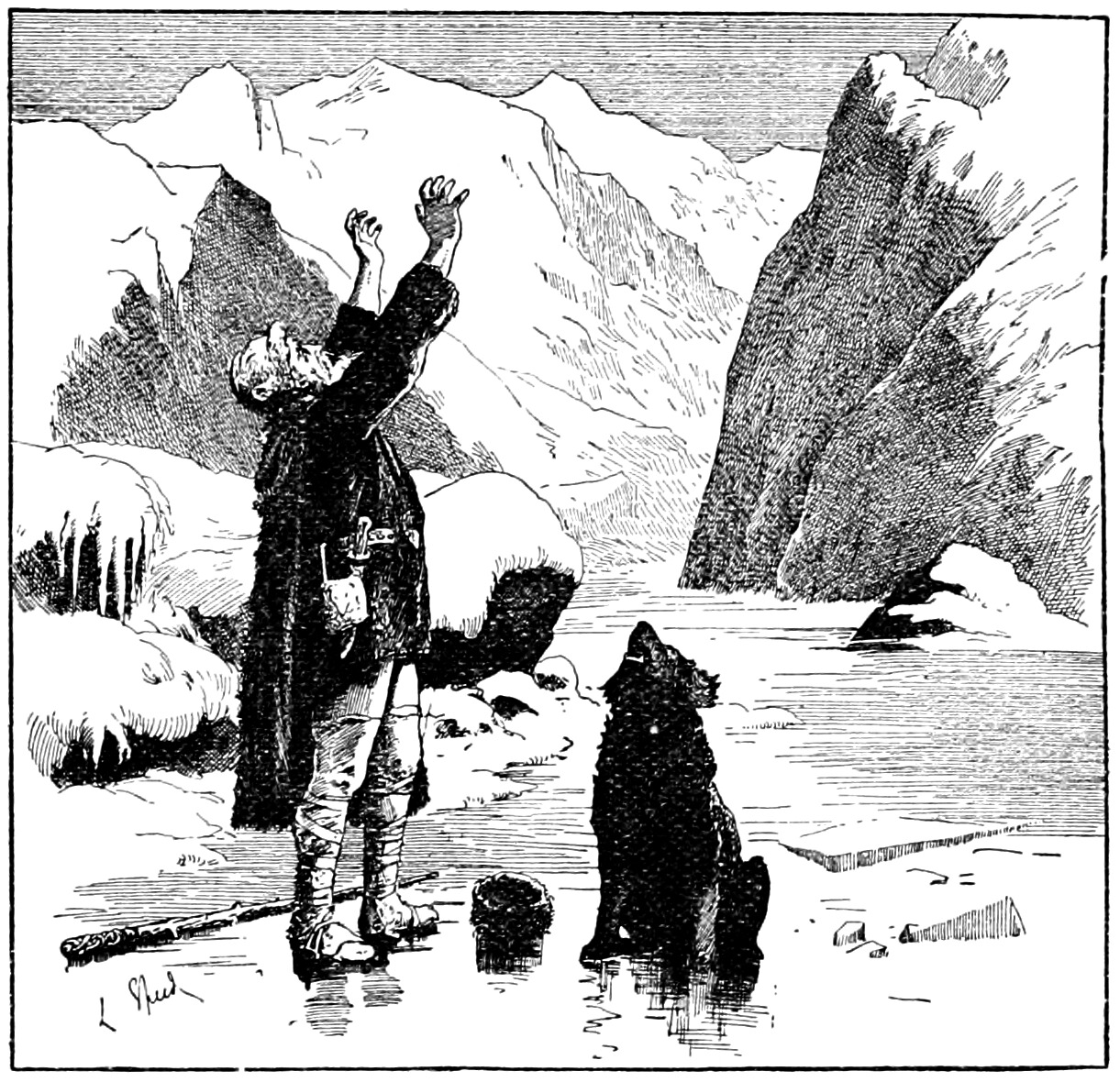
Illustration for The Red Fairy Book

Farmer Weathersky (Norwegian: Bonde Værskjegg) is a Norwegian fairy tale collected by Peter Chr. Asbjørnsen and Jørgen Moe in Norske Folkeeventyr.

Andrew Lang included it in The Red Fairy Book as "Farmer Weatherbeard".

It is Aarne–Thompson type 325, The Magician and His Pupil, and involves several transformation chases. This tale type is well known in India and Europe and notably stable in form. Others of this type include Master and Pupil and The Thief and His Master. A literary variant is Maestro Lattantio and His Apprentice Dionigi.

A version of the tale appears in A Book of Wizards by Ruth Manning-Sanders.

== Synopsis ==
A farmer was trying to apprentice his son, but because his wife insisted that the boy must learn to be a master above all masters struggled to find him a place. Finally, a driver, Farmer Weathersky, accepted the boy and told him to get on his sleigh, whereupon it flew off into the air. When the farmer told his wife what had happened she sent him off to look for the boy.

He found a hag in the forest, and she consulted all the animals and was unable to tell him where to find Farmer Weathersky. She sent him to her sister, who unsuccessfully consulted all the fish and sent him on to the third sister, who consulted all the birds and found an eagle who could help him. The eagle sent him in to steal three crumbs of bread, three hairs from a man who snored, who proved to be Farmer Weathersky himself, a stone, and three chips of wood, and to use the crumbs to catch a hare.

They were chased by a flock of crows, but the father threw down the hairs, and they turned to ravens that drove them off. Then Farmer Weathersky himself came after them, and the father threw down the wood chips, which turned to a forest, and Farmer Weathersky had to go back to get his ax. When he got through the forest, the father threw down the stone, and it turned to a mountain. Trying to get through it, Farmer Weathersky broke his leg and had to go home. The man took the hare to a churchyard and sprinkled the dirt over him, and the hare became his son.

When it was time for the fair, the son turned into a horse and told his father not to sell him with the headstall. The father sells him twice, with the son escaping afterward, but third time, Farmer Weathersky bought him and got the father so drunk he forgot to take off the headstall.

Farmer Weathersky rode him off but decided to have a drink. So he tied up the horse with red-hot nails at its nose and a sieve of oats at its tail, but a lass saw it and released the horse. The boy jumped into the duckpond, turning himself into a fish, and Farmer Weathersky turned into a pike. The boy turned into a dove, and Farmer Weathersky into a hawk, but a princess saw the chase and said he should come in her window. He told her his tale, and she had him turn into a golden ring on her finger, though he warned her that the king would fall ill, and Farmer Weathersky would cure him and demand the ring as payment; she said that she would claim the ring was from her mother.

It happened, and the king insisted on the payment, whatever the princess said. The princess put the ring in the fireplace's ashes, and Farmer Weathersky turned into a cock to scrape among them, and the boy turned into a fox and bit off his head.

== Commentary ==
Farmer Weathersky is sometimes translated as Farmer Windie, because of his obvious connection to the winds. He tells the father that he is equally at home in all the directions.

This tale is similar to sequences in T.H. White's The Once and Future King and the Disney 1963 animated film based on it, The Sword in the Stone.

== Legacy ==
Bonde Værskjegg is the name given to tale type ATU 325 in Ørnulf Hodne's The Types of the Norwegian Folktale.

== See also ==
- Foundling-Bird
- The Magic Book
