= Sweet Porridge =

German fairy tale

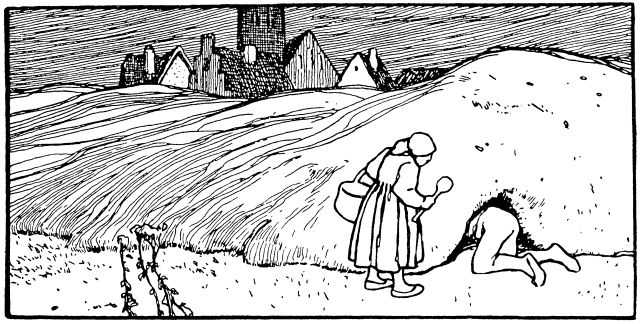
- 1909 illustration. Residents eat their way back to the town through the mound of porridge.

Folk tale
- Name: Sweet Porridge
- Also known as: The Magic Porridge Pot
- Aarne–Thompson grouping: ATU 565
- Country: Germany
- Published in: Grimms' Fairy Tales
- Related: Why the Sea Is Salt; The Water Mother

"Sweet Porridge" (German: Der süße Brei), often known in English under the title of "The Magic Porridge Pot", is a folkloric German fairy tale recorded by the Brothers Grimm, as tale number 103 in Grimm's Fairy Tales, in the 19th century. It is Aarne–Thompson–Uther type 565, "the magic mill". Other tales of this type include Why the Sea Is Salt and The Water Mother.

== Brothers Grimm, ==
There was a poor but good little girl who lived alone with her mother, and they no longer had anything to eat. So the child went into the forest, and there an aged woman met her who was aware of her sorrow, and presented her with a little pot, which when she said, "Cook, little pot, cook," then the pot would cook good, sweet millet porridge, and when she said, "Stop, little pot," it ceased to cook.

The girl took the pot home to her mother, and now they were freed from their poverty and hunger, and ate sweet porridge as often as they chose. Once upon a time when the girl had gone out, her mother said, "Cook, little pot, cook." And it did cook and she ate until she was satisfied, and then she wanted the pot to stop cooking, but did not know the word. So it went on cooking and the porridge rose over the edge, and still it cooked on until the kitchen and whole house were full, and then the next house, and then the whole street, just as if it wanted to satisfy the hunger of the whole world, and there was the greatest distress, but no one knew how to stop it.

At last when only one single house remained, the child came home and just said, "Stop, little pot," and it stopped and gave up cooking, and whosoever wished to return to the town had to eat their way back.

== Karel Jaromír Erben ==
A rather similar story was recorded by Czech folklorist Karel Jaromír Erben under the title "Hrnečku, vař!" ("Cook, Little Pot!"). It was used in the 1963 animation Hrnečku, vař! by Czech director Václav Bedřich. In his version, shot in Communist Czechoslovakia, the pot is the center of the conflict between poor peasants and greedy exploiters. In the happy ending the greedy ones are forced to flee by the flood of porridge from the pot, and, by the laws of Socialist utopia, food is fairly given to everyone.

== Soviet animation ==
In 1984 Soyuzmultfilm studio released a 20-min. animated film "A Pot of Porridge" (Russian: Горшочек каши) dubbed into French as La Marmite de Porridge. In the film a poor girl was awarded with the magic pot for her kindness. A greedy baker Karl Hagenbeck tricks her into giving him the pot and starts selling the porridge...

== See also ==
- The Sorcerer's Apprentice
- The Master and His Pupil
- Strega Nona
