= Why the Sea is Salt =

Norwegian fairy tale

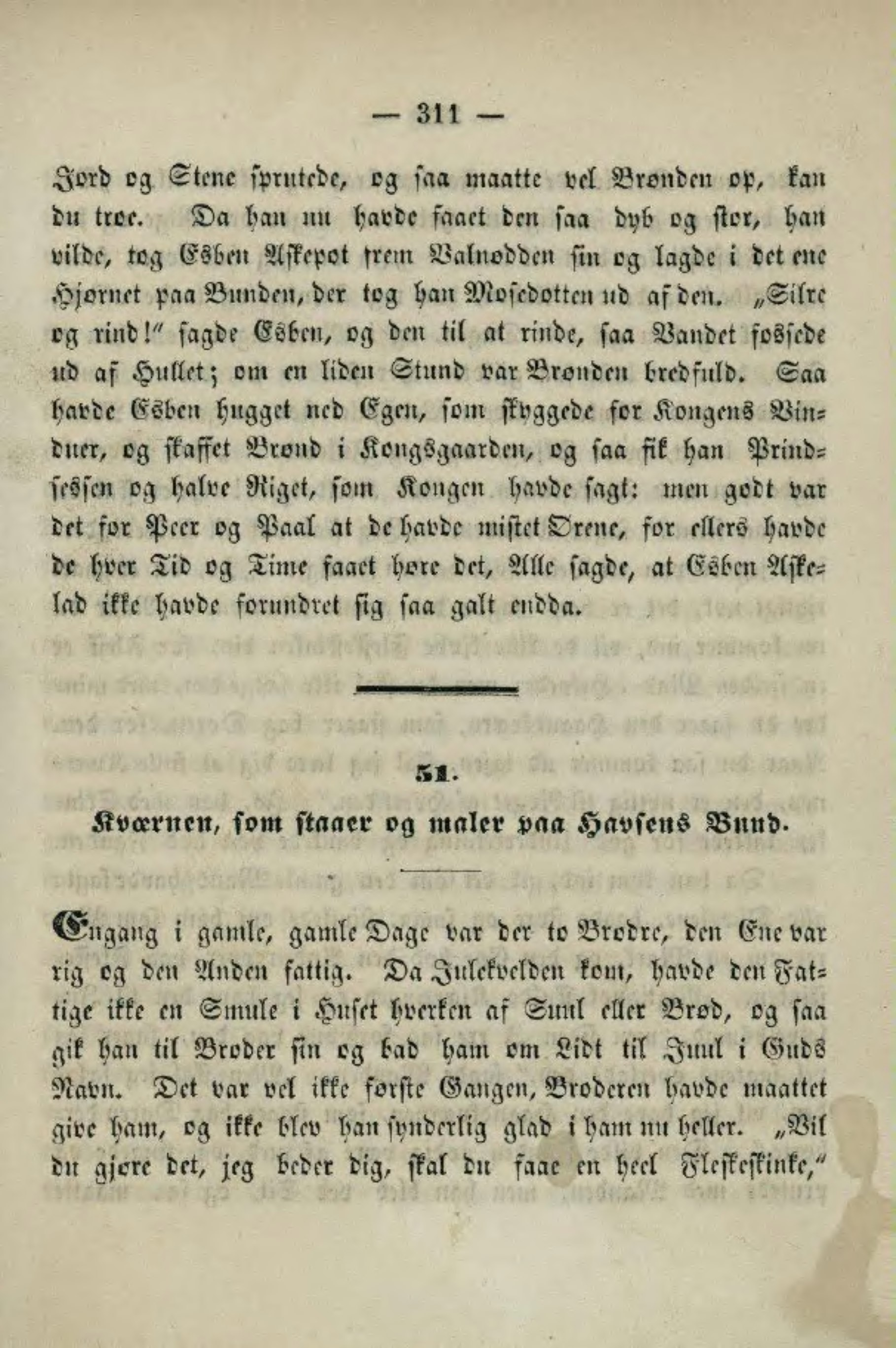
first page

Why the Sea Is Salt (Norwegian: Kvernen som maler på havsens bunn; the mill that grinds at the bottom of the sea) is a Norwegian fairy tale collected by Peter Christen Asbjørnsen and Jørgen Moe in their Norske Folkeeventyr. Andrew Lang included it in The Blue Fairy Book (1889).

== Synopsis ==
In the story a poor man begs for food from his rich brother on Christmas Eve. The brother promised him ham or bacon or a lamb (depending on the variant) if the poor man promised to a do a task in return. The poor brother promised; the rich one handed over the food and told him to go to Hel (in Lang's version, the Dead Men's Hall; in the Greek, the Devil's dam), for a hand-mill. Since he had promised, the poor brother set out.

In the Norse variants, he meets an old man along the way. In some variants, the man begs from him, and he shares with the beggar. However, when the poor man is about to share the meat, the old man tells him that in Hel/Hell (or the hall), the dwarves there love that kind of meat but can never get any. The beggar instructs the poor man to barter for the hand-mill behind the door, then return to him for directions to use it.

The dwarves offered many fine goods for the meat, but the poor man stubbornly refused to sell the meat until they offered their mill. Going back to the beggar, he tells the poor man that the mill will create whatever he asks, but it will work incessantly until the wisher says "Good little mill, I thank you enough." In the Greek version, he merely brought the lamb and told the devils that he would take whatever they would give him, and they gave him the mill.

He took it to his wife, and had it grind out everything they needed for Christmas, from lights to tablecloth to meat and ale. They ate well and on the third day, they had a great feast. His rich brother was astounded and when the poor man had drunk too much, he showed his rich brother the hand-mill (in some variants the poor man's children innocently betray the secret).

The rich brother persuades him to sell it. In the Norse version, the poor brother intentionally did not teach him how to handle/stop it. The rich brother had the mill grind out herrings and broth, but it soon flooded his house. The rich man begged his brother to take it back but he refused until the rich man paid him again, as much as he paid to have it. In the Greek version, the brother set out to Constantinople by ship. In the Norse version, a skipper wanted to buy the hand-mill from the no longer poor brother, and eventually persuaded him. Again, the instructions for how to stop the mill were not shared.

In all versions, the new owner took it to sea and set it to grind out salt. It ground out salt until it sank the boat, and then went on grinding in the sea, turning the sea salty.

== Analysis ==
The tale is classified in the Aarne-Thompson-Uther Index type 565, the Magic Mill. Other tales of this type include The Water Mother and Sweet porridge.

=== Parallels ===
It is a late parallel to the Old Norse poem Grottasöngr, found in Snorri Sturluson's Skáldskaparmál.

=== Variants ===
Georgios A. Megas collected a Greek variant The Mill in Folktales of Greece.

Japanese scholar Kunio Yanagita listed some variants of The Handmill that Ground out Salt found in Japan, and even remarked that it was part of a group of tales speculated to have been imported into Japan. Fellow scholar Seki Keigo reported 14 variants of the tale type in "Japanese oral tradition". While recognizing that the story appears "widely told in Europe", he also claimed that no version was found in India, and only one in China.

Russian scholarship points out that the tale type is also "very common" among Slavic countries, as well as among Germanic, Celtic and Baltic, which seems to indicate a common shared myth about the nature of the sea. However, according to research Galina Kabakova, the tale type has been collected from the Russian populations of Lithuania and Latvia. Also, the tale type shows a "sporadic" presence in Central Ukraine, apart from "a great number" of variants collected in Lithuania and Latvia.

Variants are also present in Estonia, such as the tale Wie das Wasser im Meer salzig geworden ("How seawater became salty").

Folklorist Wolfram Eberhard stated that the tale type is "found ... particularly in Scandinavia".
