= The Water Mother =

Chinese fairy tale

The Water Mother is a Chinese fairy tale collected by Wolfram Eberhard in Folktales of China. It does not exist in an early text, although the cult of the Water Mother existed from the time of the Song dynasty.

Wolfram Eberhard pointed out that "elements" of the Aarne-Thompson-Uther Index type ATU 565 appear here. Other tales of this type are Sweet Porridge and Why the Sea Is Salt -- Why the Sea Is Salt also using it as an explanatory legend.

== Synopsis ==
A woman lived with her mother-in-law and daughter; though she was dutiful, her mother-in-law hated her. One day, she decreed that they could not buy water from water-carriers, but her daughter-in-law would have to carry it from the well. The work was too hard for her, but she was beaten when she failed. One day, she thought of drowning herself in the well. An old woman told her not to, and gave her a stick, which, when used to strike the pail, would fill it with water. She was to tell no one of the stick's power, and to never strike the pail twice.

For a time, she was happy, but her mother-in-law spied on her, stole the stick, and struck the pail twice. This caused a flood that drowned many houses and her daughter-in-law. The pail had become a spring. Afterward, a temple was raised for the daughter-in-law, and they called her the Water Mother.

== See also ==
- Shuimu
