= Aarne–Thompson–Uther Index =

Index used to classify folk narratives

The Aarne–Thompson–Uther Index (ATU Index) is a catalogue of folktale types used in folklore studies. The ATU index is the product of a series of revisions and expansions by an international group of scholars: Originally published in German by Finnish folklorist Antti Aarne (1910), the index was translated into English, revised, and expanded by American folklorist Stith Thompson (1928, 1961), and later further revised and expanded by German folklorist Hans-Jörg Uther (2004). The ATU index is an essential tool for folklorists, used along with the Thompson (1932) Motif-Index of Folk-Literature.

== Background ==
=== Predecessors ===
Austrian consul Johann Georg von Hahn devised a preliminary analysis of some 40 tale "formulae" as introduction to his book of Greek and Albanian folktales, published in 1864.

Reverend Sabine Baring-Gould, in 1866, translated von Hahn's list and extended it to 52 tale types, which he called "story radicals". Folklorist J. Jacobs expanded the list to 70 tale types and published it as "Appendix C" in Burne & Gomme's Handbook of Folk-Lore.

Before the edition of Antti Aarne's first folktale classification, Astrid Lunding translated Svend Grundtvig's system of folktale classification. This catalogue consisted of 134 types, mostly based on Danish folktale compilations in comparison to international collections available at the time by other folklorists, such as the Brothers Grimm's and Emmanuel Cosquin's.

=== History ===
Antti Aarne was a student of Julius Krohn and his son Kaarle Krohn. Aarne developed the historic-geographic method of comparative folkloristics, and developed the initial version of what became the Aarne–Thompson tale type index for classifying folktales, first published in 1910 as Verzeichnis der Märchentypen ("List of Fairy Tale Types"). The system was based on identifying motifs and the repeated narrative ideas that can be seen as the building-blocks of traditional narrative; its scope was European.

The American folklorist Stith Thompson revised Aarne's classification system in 1928, enlarging its scope, while also translating it from German into English. In doing so, he created the "AT number system" (also referred to as "AaTh system") which remained in use through the second half of the century. Another edition with further revisions by Thompson followed in 1961. According to American folklorist D.L. Ashliman,

The Aarne–Thompson system catalogues some 2500 basic plots from which, for countless generations, European and Near Eastern storytellers have built their tales.

—

The AT-number system was updated and expanded in 2004 with the publication of The Types of International Folktales: A Classification and Bibliography by German folklorist H.-J. Uther. Uther noted that many of the earlier descriptions were cursory and often imprecise, that many "irregular types" are in fact old and widespread, and that "emphasis on oral tradition" often obscured "older, written versions of the tale types". To remedy these shortcomings Uther developed the Aarne–Thompson–Uther (ATU) classification system and included more tales from eastern and southern Europe as well as "smaller narrative forms" in this expanded listing. He also put the emphasis of the collection more explicitly on international folktales, removing examples whose attestation was limited to one ethnic group.

== Index ==
=== Definitions ===
In The Folktale, Thompson defines a tale type as follows:

A type is a traditional tale that has an independent existence. It may be told as a complete narrative and does not depend for its meaning on any other tale. It may indeed happen to be told with another tale, but the fact that it may be told alone attests its independence. It may consist of only one motif or of many.

— Thompson (1977), p. 415

=== System ===
The Aarne–Thompson Tale Type Index divides tales into sections with an AT number for each entry. The names given are typical, but usage varies; the same tale type number may be referred to by its central motif or by one of the variant folktales of that type, which can also vary, especially when used in different countries and cultures. The name does not have to be strictly literal for every folktale. For example, The Cat as Helper (545B) also includes tales where a fox helps the hero. Closely related folktales are often grouped within a type. For example, tale types 400–424 all feature brides or wives as the primary protagonist, for instance The Quest for a Lost Bride (400) or the Animal Bride (402). Subtypes within a tale type are designated by the addition of a letter to the AT number, for instance: tale 510, Persecuted Heroine (renamed in Uther's revision as Cinderella and Peau d'Âne ["Cinderella and Donkey Skin"]), has subtypes 510A, Cinderella, and 510B, Catskin (renamed in Uther's revision as Peau d'Asne [also "Donkey Skin"]).

As an example, the entry for 510A in the ATU index (with cross-references to motifs in Thompson's Motif-Index of Folk Literature in square brackets, and variants in parentheses) reads:

510A Cinderella. (Cenerentola, Cendrillon, Aschenputtel.) A young woman is mistreated by her stepmother and stepsisters [S31, L55] and has to live in the ashes as a servant. When the sisters and the stepmother go to a ball (church), they give Cinderella an impossible task (e.g. sorting peas from ashes), which she accomplishes with the help of birds [B450]. She obtains beautiful clothing from a supernatural being [D1050.1, N815] or a tree that grows on the grave of her deceased mother [D815.1, D842.1, E323.2] and goes unknown to the ball. A prince falls in love with her [N711.6, N711.4], but she has to leave the ball early [C761.3]. The same thing happens on the next evening, but on the third evening, she loses one of her shoes [R221, F823.2].

The prince will marry only the woman whom the shoe fits [H36.1]. The stepsisters cut pieces off their feet in order to make them fit into the shoe [K1911.3.3.1], but a bird calls attention to this deceit. Cinderella, who had first been hidden from the prince, tries on the shoe and it fits her. The prince marries her.

Combinations: This type is usually combined with episodes of one or more other types, esp. 327A, 403, 480, 510B, and also 408, 409, 431, 450, 511, 511A, 707, and 923.

Remarks: Documented by Basile, Pentamerone (I,6) in the 17th century.

The entry concludes, like others in the catalogue, with a long list of references to secondary literature on the tale, and variants of it.

== Critical response ==
In his 1997 essay "The motif-index and the tale type index: A critique", American folklorist Alan Dundes explains that the Aarne–Thompson indexes are some of the "most valuable tools in the professional folklorist's arsenal of aids for analysis". They have, however, been subject to criticism concerning their construction, where they apply, and what they exclude.

=== Construction ===
The tale type index was criticized by V. Propp of the Russian Formalist school of the 1920s for ignoring the functions of the motifs by which they are classified. Furthermore, Propp contended that using a "macro-level" analysis means that the stories that share motifs might not be classified together, while stories with wide divergences may be grouped under one tale type because the index must select some features as salient. (Note: Dundes similarly, points out that "Aarne's mistake was not classifying tales on the basis of narrative plot rather than [on characters]" because "the same tale can be told with either animal or human characters" (197).) He also observed that although the distinction between animal tales and tales of the fantastic was basically correct – no one would classify "Tsarevitch Ivan, the Fire Bird and the Gray Wolf" as an animal tale, just because of the wolf – it did raise questions because animal tales often contained fantastic elements, and tales of the fantastic often contained animals; indeed a tale could shift categories if a peasant deceived a bear rather than a devil.

In 2009, describing the motivation for his work, Uther presents several criticisms of the original index. He points out that Thompson's focus on oral tradition sometimes neglects older versions of stories, even when written records exist, and that some included folktale types have dubious importance.

In regards to the typological classification, some folklorists and tale comparativists have acknowledged singular tale types that, due to their own characteristics, would merit their own type. (Note: On the other hand, some independent tale types have been called into question, even by Thompson: Confined, so far as now appears, to a very limited section of eastern Europe is the story of the hero called "I don't know". It is hard to tell whether this should be considered as a distinct tale type (type 532), or merely as a variety of the Goldener story (tale type 314). — Thompson (1977), p. 61) Although such tales often have not been listed in the international folktale system, they can exist in regional or national classification systems.

=== Geographic relevance ===
In his 2009 critique, Uther finds that the distribution of stories is uneven (with Eastern and Southern European as well as many other regions' folktale types being under-represented). Similarly, Thompson had noted that the tale type index might well be called The Types of the Folk-Tales of Europe, West Asia, and the Lands Settled by these Peoples. However, Dundes notes that in spite of the flaws of tale type indexes (including typos, redundancies, and censorship):

they represent the keystones for the comparative method in folkloristics, a method which despite postmodern naysayers ... continues to be the hallmark of international folkloristics.

—

The ATU folktype index has been criticized for its apparent geographic concentration on Europe and North Africa, showing over-representation of Eurasia (Note: "Stith Thompson himself indicated that the AT-Index works only for the Hindu-European ('from Ireland to India') cultural area. He assumed that the folklore of other areas would not be well integrated in the AT system.") and North America. The catalogue appears to ignore or under-represent other regions. Central Asian examples include: Yuri Berezkin's The captive Khan and the clever daughter-in-law (and variants); The travelling girl and her helpful siblings; and Woman's magical horse, as named by researcher Veronica Muskheli of the University of Washington.

=== Themes excluded ===
Author Pete Jordi Wood claims that topics related to homosexuality have been excluded intentionally from the type index. Similarly, folklorist Joseph P. Goodwin states that Thompson omitted "much of the extensive body of sexual and 'obscene' material", and that – as of 1995 – "topics like homosexuality are still largely excluded from the type and motif indexes." In a 2002 essay, Alan Dundes also criticized Thompson's handling of the folkloric subject material, which he considered to be "excessive prudery" and a form of censorship.

== Distribution by origin ==
A quantitative study published by folklorist S. Graça da Silva and anthropologist J.J. Tehrani in 2016, attempted to evaluate the time of emergence for the "Tales of Magic" (ATU 300–ATU 749), based on a phylogenetic model. They found four of them to belong to the Proto-Indo-European stratum of magic tales. (Note: The KHM indices refer to Grimms' Fairy Tales.)

- ATU 328 The Boy Steals Ogre's Treasure (= Jack and the Beanstalk and Thirteen)
- ATU 330 The Smith and the Devil (KHM 81a)
- ATU 402 The Animal Bride (= The Three Feathers, KHM 63 and The Poor Miller's Boy and the Cat, KHM 106)
- ATU 554 The Grateful Animals (= The White Snake, KHM 17 and The Queen Bee, KHM 62)

Ten more magic tales were found to be current throughout the Western branch of the Indo-European languages, comprising the main European language families derived from PIE (i.e. Balto-Slavic, Germanic, Italic and Celtic):

- ATU 311 Rescue by Sister (= Fitcher's Bird, KHM 46)
- ATU 332 Godfather Death (= KHM 44)
- ATU 425C Beauty and the Beast
- ATU 470 Friends in Life and Death
- ATU 500 The Name of the Supernatural Helper (= Rumpelstiltskin, KHM 55)
- ATU 505 The Grateful Dead
- ATU 531 The Clever Horse (= Ferdinand the Faithful and Ferdinand the Unfaithful, KHM 126)
- ATU 592 The Dance Among Thorns (Note: The original version of the "Dance Among the Thorns" tale-type comes from 15th century Europe, and features a monk who was forced to dance in a thorn bush, by a boy with a magic flute or fiddle. It reflected the anticlerical sentiment of many folk tales at the time, and implies that the monk deserves this punishment. Grimms' The Jew Among Thorns (KHM 110) is an example of this type of tale. An American version of this tale, told to folklorist Marie Campbell in 1958 in Kentucky, included this apology from the informant: "Seems like all the tales about Jews gives the Jews a bad name — greedy, grabbing for cash money, cheating their work hands out of their wages—I don't know what all. I never did know a Jew, never even met up with one.")
- ATU 650A Strong John (= Strong Hans, KHM 166)
- ATU 675 The Lazy Boy (= Peruonto and Emelian the Fool)

== Particular items ==
- Bear's Son Tale and Jean de l'Ours, analyses of tale-types 301 and 650A
- Animal as Bridegroom, analysis of ATU 425 and related types
  - Again, The Snake Bridegroom, ATU 425A subtype
  - Eglė the Queen of Serpents, ATU 425M subtype
- The Bird Lover, analysis of tale-type 432
- The Spinning-Woman by the Spring, overview of type 480
- Grateful dead (folklore), analysis of types 505–508
- Calumniated Wife, an overview of ATU types 705–712
- The Three Golden Children, analysis of type ATU 707
- Riddle-tale, an analysis of types 851, 851A and 927

== Examples ==
- ATU 451 "The Maiden Who Seeks Her Brothers" or "The Brothers Who Turned into Birds":
  - The Six Swans
  - The Wild Swans
  - The Seven Ravens
  - The Twelve Wild Ducks
  - Udea and Her Seven Brothers
  - The Twelve Brothers
- ATU 565 "the magic mill":
  - Why the Sea is Salt
    - It is a late parallel to the Old Norse poem Grottasöngr
  - Sweet Porridge, several variants
  - Strega Nona
  - The Water Mother, Chinese fairy tale

== See also ==
- Morphology (folkloristics)
- Motif-Index of Folk-Literature
- Roud Folk Song Index

== Bibliography ==
- Aarne, A. (1961). The Types of the Folktale: A classification and bibliography. Helsinki, FI: Suomalainen Tiedeakatemia [Finnish Academy of Science and Letters]. ISBN 951-41-0132-4.
- Ashliman, D.L. (1987). A Guide to Folktales in the English Language: Based on the Aarne–Thompson Classification System. New York, NY: Greenwood Press.
- Azzolina, David S. (1987). Tale Type- and Motif-Indexes: An annotated bibliography. New York, NY / London, UK: Garland.
- Dundes, A. (1997). "The motif-index and the tale type index: A critique". Journal of Folklore Research. 34 (3): 195–202. JSTOR 3814885.
- Karsdorp, Folgert; van der Meulen, Marten; Meder, Theo; van den Bosch, Antal (2 January 2015). "MOMFER: A search engine of Thompson's Motif-Index of Folk Literature". Folklore. 126 (1): 37–52. doi:10.1080/0015587X.2015.1006954. S2CID 162278853.
- Thompson, S. (1932). Motif-Index of Folk-Literature.
- Thompson, S. (1977). The Folktale. Berkeley, CA: University of California Press. ISBN 0-520-03537-2 – via Google.
- Uther, H.-J. (2004). The Types of International Folktales: A classification and bibliography based on the system of Antti Aarne and Stith Thompson. Folklore Fellows' Communications. Vol. 284–286. Helsinki, FI: Suomalainen Tiedeakatemia. ISSN 0014-5815. In three volumes: ISBN 951-41-0955-4 (vol. 1), ISBN 951-41-0961-9 (vol. 2), ISBN 951-41-0963-5 (vol. 3.)
- Uther, H.-J. (2011). The Types of International Folktales: A classification and bibliography based on the system of Antti Aarne and Stith Thompson. Folklore Fellows' Communications. Vol. 284–286 (2nd printing ed.). Helsinki, FI: Suomalainen Tiedeakatemia. ISSN 0014-5815. In three volumes: ISBN 978-951-41-1054-2 (vol. 1), ISBN 978-951-41-1055-9 (vol. 2), ISBN 978-951-41-1067-2 (vol. 3.)
