= Bearskin (disambiguation) =

A bearskin is a tall fur cap.

Bearskin may also refer to:

- the pelt of a bear
- Bearskin (German fairy tale), a traditional German fairy tale, collected by the Brothers Grimm, about a deal with the devil
- Bearskin (French fairy tale), a French literary fairy tale by Marie-Madeleine de Lubert
- Bearskin (film), a 1986 German film
- Bearskin Airlines, a small airline operating in Ontario and Manitoba, Canada
- Mount Bearskin, Antarctica
- Bearskin Neck, Massachusetts

== Persons with the surname ==
- Leaford Bearskin (1921–2012), American tribal leader and military officer

== See also ==
- Bearskin Lake (disambiguation)
