= Der Bärenhäuter =

Der Bärenhäuter (German "Bearskin man") may refer to:

- Der Bärenhäuter (fairy tale), Bearskin, by the Brothers Grimm
- Der Bärenhäuter (opera), by Siegfried Wagner 1899
- Der Bärenhäuter, opera by Arnold Mendelssohn
- Der Bärenhäuter (film)
