= Dorothea Viehmann =

German storyteller

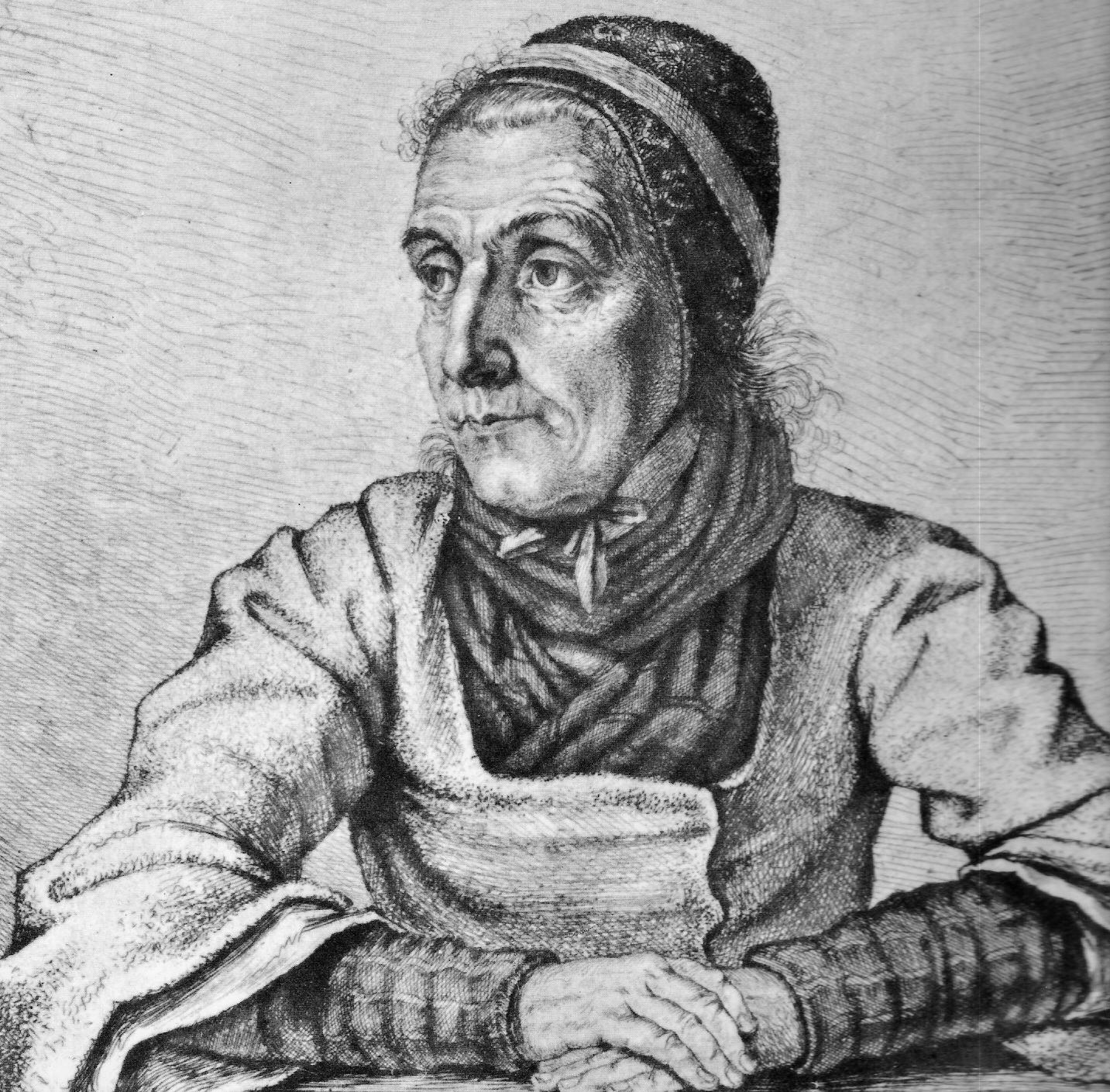
- Dorothea Viehmann, contemporary portrait by Ludwig Emil Grimm, a brother of Wilhelm and Jacob Grimm
- Born: 8 November 1755; Rengershausen, Hesse-Kassel
- Died: 17 November 1815 (aged 60)

Dorothea Viehmann (November 8, 1755 – November 17, 1815) was a German storyteller. Her stories were an important source for the fairy tales collected by the Brothers Grimm. Most of Dorothea Viehmann's tales were published in the second volume of Grimms' Fairy Tales.

== Life ==
Dorothea Viehmann was born as Katharina Dorothea Pierson in Rengershausen near Kassel as a daughter of a tavern owner. Her paternal ancestors were persecuted Huguenots who fled from France to Hesse-Kassel after the Edict of Nantes was revoked. As she grew up, Viehmann picked up numerous stories, legends and fairy tales from the guests of her father's tavern.

In 1777 Dorothea Pierson married the tailor Nikolaus Viehmann. From 1787 to 1798 the family lived in Niederzwehren, today part of the city of Kassel. After the death of her husband, she had to provide for herself and her seven children by selling products from her garden at the local market.

She became acquainted with the Brothers Grimm in 1813 and told them more than forty tales and variations. Because of Viehmann's Huguenot ancestors, a number of her stories are based on French fairy tales. Wilhelm Grimm wrote that it was an amazing coincidence that he and his brother had met this woman. The brothers were especially impressed that Viehmann could retell her stories again and again without changing a word. There are, however, several examples of her stories which remained incomplete.

== Fairy tales ==
A number of stories in Grimms' Fairy Tales are likely to trace back to Dorothea Viehmann:

- KHM 6: Trusty John or Faithful John (Der treue Johannes)
- KHM 9: The Twelve Brothers (Die zwölf Brüder)
- KHM 29: The Devil With the Three Golden Hairs (Der Teufel mit den drei goldenen Haaren)
- KHM 34: Clever Elsie (Die kluge Else)
- KHM 61: The Little Peasant (Das Bürle)
- KHM 63: The Three Feathers (Die drei Federn)
- KHM 71: How Six Men got on in the World (Sechse kommen durch die ganze Welt)
- KHM 76: The Pink (Die Nelke)
- KHM 89: The Goose Girl (Die Gänsemagd)
- KHM 94: The Peasant's Wise Daughter (Die kluge Bauerntochter)
- KHM 98: Doctor Know-all (Doktor Allwissend)
- KHM 100: The Devil's Sooty Brother (Des Teufels rußiger Bruder)
- KHM 102: The Willow-Wren and the Bear (Der Zaunkönig und der Bär)
- KHM 106: The Poor Miller's Boy and the Cat (Der arme Müllersbursch und das Kätzchen)
- KHM 108: Hans My Hedgehog (Hans mein Igel)
- KHM 111: The Skillful Huntsman (Der gelernte Jäger)
- KHM 115: The Bright Sun Brings it to Light (Die klare Sonne bringt's an den Tag)
- KHM 118: The Three Army Surgeons (Die drei Feldscherer)
- KHM 125: The Devil and His Grandmother (Der Teufel und seine Großmutter)
- KHM 127: The Iron Stove (Der Eisenofen)
- KHM 128: The Lazy Spinner (Die faule Spinnerin)

The abbreviation "KHM" refers to the collection's original title Kinder- und Hausmärchen. The Brothers Grimm marked those texts tracing back to Dorothea Viehmann with the comment "aus Zwehrn" ("from Zwehrn", short for "Niederzwehren").

== Locations and memorials ==
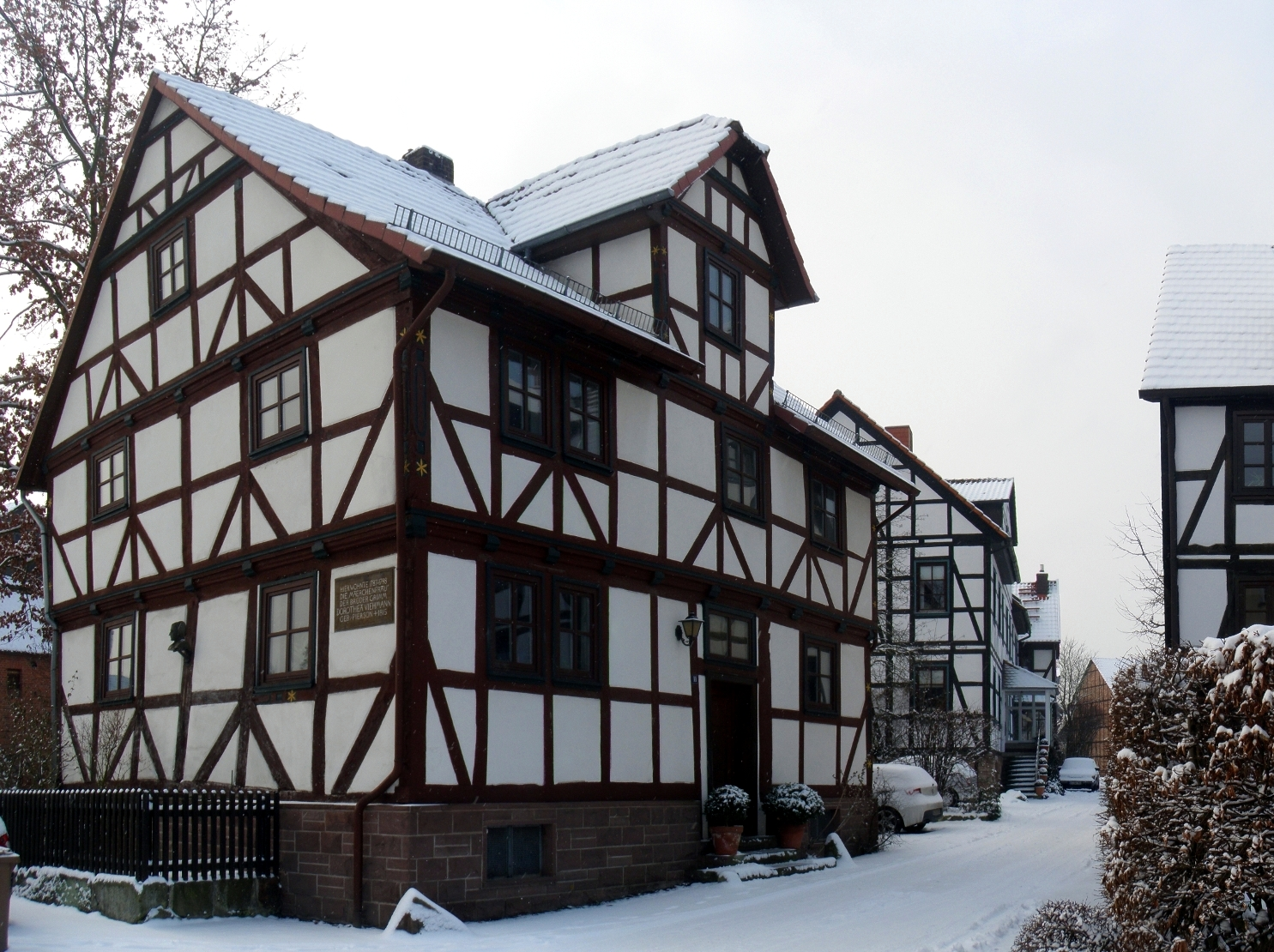
Home of Dorothea Viehmann in Niederzwehren, where she lived between 1787 and 1798

The historical part of Niederzwehren is today sometimes called Märchenviertel, Fairy Tale Quarter, in honor of the famous storyteller. Memorial signs on two timber-framed houses indicate where Dorothea Viehmann used to live between 1787 and 1798 and from 1798 until her death.

Both the Quarter's elementary school and a recently created park bear the name of the storyteller.

The tavern and brewery owned by Dorothea Viehmann's father is now run by the local Hütt brewery. It is located next to the Bundesautobahn 49 near the motorway junction Kassel-West at Baunatal-Rengershausen.

In 2009, a memorial of Dorothea Viehmann by the artist Berahna Massoum was installed close to the Fairy Tale Quarter.

== See also ==
- Grimms' Fairy Tales
- Brothers Grimm
