= Der Bärenhäuter (opera) =

Opera by Siegfried Wagner

Der Bärenhäuter is an 1899 German-language opera in three acts by Siegfried Wagner based on the German folk tale "Der Bärenhäuter" ("Bearskin"). As with most of Siegfried Wagner's operas it is more influenced by his teacher Humperdinck than his father Richard Wagner's operas. Siegfried Wagner composed the music and wrote the libretto for his opera which takes place during the Thirty Years' War near Bayreuth.

Based on the Brothers Grimm fairy tale of the same name and the first of his 17 operas, Der Bärenhäuter received its premiere on 22 January 1899 at the National Theatre Munich.

== Roles ==
- Hans Kraft, young soldier (tenor)
- Melchior Fröhlich, mayor (bass)
- Lene, Gunda, Luise, the mayor's three daughters (sopranos)
- Pastor Wippenbeck (baritone)
- Nikolaus Spitz, innkeeper (tenor buffo)
- Anna, barmaid (mezzo-soprano)
- Colonel Muffel von der Plassenburg (bass)
- Kaspar Wild, sergeant (baritone)
- The stranger (baritone)
- The devil (basso buffo)
- Farmer, farm women, soldiers (Muffle's companies), mermaids, a flock of little devils, children

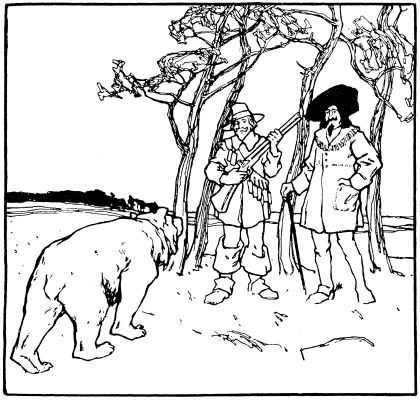
Illustration by Otto Ubbelohde of the fairy tale "Bearskin" (1909)

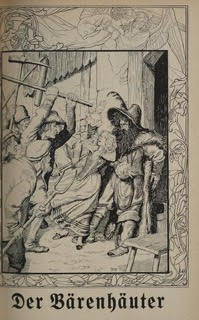
Cover page in Paul Pretzsch's chapter on the opera Der Bärenhäuter, 1919, p. 72

== Background and context ==
In the spring of 1895 Siegfried Wagner learned about Engelbert Humperdinck's idea of setting two related fairy tales of the Brothers Grimm, "Bearskin" and "The Devil's Sooty Brother", to music. When Humperdinck abandoned the notion, Wagner became inspired to pursue the project.

With musical themes in mind, Wagner began composing the overture in early 1896. In comparison to the preludes and overtures of his contemporaries, such as Eugen d'Albert, Engelbert Humperdinck and Richard Strauss, his overture's playing time of 14 minutes ranks equally as extensive as his peers' works, but unlike Richard Strauss' powerful orchestrations which entailed larger and larger orchestras, Wagner chose not to expand his orchestra.

In order to create a plausible setting for the work, Wagner wrote his libretto based on the aforementioned fairy tales, a legend from Spielmannsbuch by Wilhelm Hertz and a historical event from the Thirty Years' War.

When Siegfried Wagner had completed act 1, a legal dispute developed between Wagner and Arnold Mendelssohn, who was working on the same material, and Mendelssohn insisted that Wagner knew he was the first to begin the composition. Even though the controversy remained unresolved, Wagner completed act 2 at the end of the Bayreuth Festival in October 1897 and the entire score on his 29th birthday, 6 June 1898.

Max Brockhaus Musikverlag in Leipzig published the work, which after its premiere was included in the repertoire of various theaters in German-speaking countries for a total of 77 performances in the first season. Venues included Frankfurt, Gotha, Hamburg, Karlsruhe, Leipzig, Vienna under the direction of Gustav Mahler, and Prague. With 177 performances on approximately 35 stages, including opera houses in England, France and Hungary, Der Bärenhäuter became the most performed opera in the 1899–1900 season.

This success marked Siegfried Wagner as a composer of fairy tale operas, just as Humperdinck had done before with his opera Hansel and Gretel in 1893. Arnold Mendelssohn's version of Der Bärenhäuter, Op. 11, had its premiere in Berlin in 1900 but was removed from the repertoire after a few performances.

== Synopsis ==
=== Act 1 ===
The inhabitants of a small village welcome home the returning soldiers of the Thirty Years' War, but ignore the unemployed and penniless Hans Kraft, whose mother died during his absence. The devil approaches him laughing and seizes this opportunity to take advantage of his dire straits and recruits Hans to look after the cauldrons in hell where the poor sinners smolder. Then Hans accompanies the devil to hell, who once again reminds him that should he not honor his obligation, he will face punishment. When the devil departs on a journey, Hans fires up the boilers and recognizes the plaintive voice of his former sergeant, Kaspar Wild, who had willfully harassed him during the war.

An old man who calls himself Peter Schliesser approaches and insidiously challenges Hans to a game of dice. Without money Hans bets souls from the cauldron and keeps losing. Finally he thinks he wins with 12 points, but doesn't realize that it is Saint Peter in front of him, who rolls the nearly impossible "13" and thus wins all the souls, who ascend to heaven with a hallelujah, but this loss put Hans in yet another bad position with the devil. Saint Peter promises his assistance in the future, but tells Hans that he now has to atone for what he has done.

Upon his return home, the devil rages when he discovers the loss of all the souls. As punishment Hans must return to the world in devil-like form, covered in black soot, to wander through the world to the ridicule of all people. Hans must not wash himself and surrender to the devil if he does not find a girl who loves him and remains faithful for three years, despite his hideous appearance. He is to give one half of his ring to the girl and if she remains faithful to him, a sign of her true love, he will be redeemed. He receives a bottomless sack of gold and if he manages to free himself, the devil will grant three additional wishes.

The devil summons other demons who disfigure Hans, spatter him with soot and excrement, and put a bearskin on him. Then a dragon's mouth-like hole spews him out of hell amid fire, lightning and thunder.

=== Act 2 ===
Hans wanders around mournfully with the bearskin slung over his shoulders. Inside a tavern, the farmer Heiner and the barmaid Anna tell each other ghost stories. When Anna answers a knock at the door, she thinks it is the devil but actually it is Hans, wearing the bearskin. When he insults them, the farmers and the pastor assume that he is a human and not the devil, but he must first prove that he has actual feet, not hooves. Eventually Hans gets through the window into the dining room and when Anna tries to question him, he pretends to be crazy. After most of the guests and the priest have departed, the innkeeper rudely awakens the mayor, who has fallen asleep at his table and threatens to pawn his property if he does not pay his long overdue bill. Hans intervenes in the scuffle and settles the mayor's debts.

Over wine the mayor tells Hans about his three unmarried daughters, whom nobody wants to marry because he is so poor, and Hans offers to be a suitor. At the May dance the next morning, Hans will meet the three daughters, whereby his appearance will be explained by the fact that Hans has taken a vow because of an unfaithful lover. The mayor says goodbye and Hans goes to bed. The innkeeper sneaks in and attempts to steal the sack that Hans left in the guest room. When he opens it, demons fly out and harass him. When Hans comes in with a lamp, the demons disappear.

At dawn the next morning, the dining room is festively decorated and the village youth dance past. Then the mayor appears with his daughters Lene, Gunda and Luise. While the two older ones mock Hans and run away, Luise, the youngest of the three sisters, notices that a tear is falling down Hans's cheek. After her gentle questioning, he finally admits that if she keeps half of his ring and remains faithful to him, she can help him. Knowing she would not forget the soot-smeared figure, she takes half of the ring and ties it on a ribbon around her neck.

Then Hans is accused of being a thief, and the innkeeper, rallying the farmers against Hans, claims that his money was the devil's money, and threatens Hans with clubs and whips. When the innkeeper says that the sixty schillings Hans paid to cover the mayor's debt are the devil's money, the innkeeper throws the money away and a flame erupts from the floor. Convicted of being the devil, Hans is condemned to death, but Luise calls other farmers for help and she herself protects him, because she believes Hans is a good person. Free from danger, Hans continues his travels.

=== Act 3 ===
The devil curses as the last minutes of Hans's three year sentence lapse and Luise has remained true to him. In one last attempt to turn the tide in his favor, the devil attempts to have mermaids woo Hans in his sleep and steal his half of the ring, but Hans foils them. Resigned to defeat as he can no longer exert control over Hans, the devil then washes and cleans him. Then Hans reiterates his three wishes: his first wish of reverting to his former self had already been fulfilled. Secondly, he wants the money and demons removed from the sack and thirdly, he wants the devil to relinquish him forever. Hans hands the bearskin to the devil as a reminder that even the devil can make a mistake and rushes to find his bride.

After an orchestral interlude, Saint Peter appears, blocks Hans's way and tells him that the Plassenburg will be attacked by the Wallensteins if he doesn't warn the unsuspecting sleeping castle residents. In great haste Hans reaches the castle, warns of the impending attack and helps drive out the enemies. Then Sergeant Kaspar Wild arrives and praises Hans's valor in the rescue effort and everyone goes to the inn to celebrate. The mayor wants to convince Luise to marry the farmer Veit. Her sisters mock her and depart, leaving Luise sad and alone.

Hans has entered unnoticed and asks Luise for bandages for the small wound he sustained in the fight. Luise hands him a cup of water into which he drops his half of the ring. Luise becomes frightened because she thinks it is her half. Then Hans reveals himself and the two hug each other gleefully.

Now Sergeant Wild returns with some farmers, the mayor and the crooked innkeeper. Hans gives the sack to the innkeeper, but he runs away screaming. The farmers surrounding Hans recognize him as the former "Bearskin" and everyone joins in Luise's prayer of thanksgiving to the angels.

== Instrumentation ==
Der Bärenhäuter is scored for three flutes (the third doubling piccolo), two oboes (the second doubling English horn), two clarinets, two bassoons, four horns, two trumpets and one bass trumpet, two trombones, one bass trombone, one tuba, one harp, strings and a percussion section with timpani, cymbals, bass drum and triangle.

== Recordings ==
- Kerstin Quandt, Roland Hartmann, Adalbert Waller, André Wenhold, Beth Johanning, Volker Horn, Henry Kiichli. Thüringian Symphony Orchestra, Konrad Bach. Marco Polo 2004
