= The Small-tooth Dog =

English fairytale

- Author: Sidney Odall Addy
- Genre: Fairytale/Folktale
- Publisher: David Nutt, Pawson and Brailsford
- Publication date: 1895
- Publication place: England
- Media type: Fairytale

The Small-Tooth Dog is a fairytale gathered by Sidney Odall Addy from the village of Norton, Derbyshire (now Sheffield) in his compilation, Household Tales and Other Traditional Remains (1895) alongside other tales such as The Little Watercress Girl and The Glass Ball. It is an Aarne-Thompson-Uther type ATU 425C tale, which places it alongside other animal bridegroom tales such as Beauty and the Beast and The Singing, Springing Lark.

== Publications ==
Ruth Manning-Sanders included it in A Book of Magic Animals. A more recent version has been rewritten by Margaret Read MacDonald and published by August House Little Folk.

== Synopsis ==
A travelling merchant is saved by a large dog and taken back to the dog's estate. The dog dressed the merchant's wounds and the merchant thanked him and offered to give the dog a reward as thanks for rescuing him, not refusing to offer even 'the most precious thing that he had'. The merchant goes through an assortment of magical items which the dog all deny, including a fish that speaks twelve languages, a goose that lays golden eggs, and a mirror in which you can see what anybody is thinking about.

The dog then asks for the merchants daughter to be taken to his house, and the merchant reluctantly agrees to let the dog take his daughter after he had been there a week. After a week had passed, the dog waited outside the merchant's house as the daughter stepped out dressed for the journey ahead. The dog was pleased and told her to jump on his back so he could take her to his house, and she complied. The dog then ran her to his home where she stayed a month before she began to cry. Upon asking what was making her cry, she explained she wanted to go back to her father.

The dog agreed under the terms that she cannot stay there for more than three days and asked what the girl called him. The girl replied that he was "A great, foul small-tooth dog" and the dog refused to take her. This caused her to cry again, and subsequently the dog asked what the girl called him. This time, the girl called him "Sweet-as-a-honeycomb" and the dog invited her on his back and walked for forty miles before reaching a stile. Again the dog inquired what the girl called him. The girl answered, "A great, foul, small-tooth dog" and the dog turned around and ran back to his house with the girl on his back.

A week later, the girl wept again and the dog promised to take her home. Once again, they stopped when they reached the stile and the dog asked what the girl called him. The girl stated he was "Sweet-as-a-honeycomb" and the dog leapt over the stile before continuing another 20 miles before reaching a second stile. Again, the dog asked, his tail wagging, what the girl called him and she, distracted by the thought of home answered, "A great, foul, small-tooth dog". This enraged the dog and it rushed back to his home with her once more. She cried for another week and the dog once again promised to take her home. Upon reaching the first stile, the dog inquired again what she called him and she replied, "Sweet-as-a-honeycomb" and the dog continued on their way. The girl decided she would say the most loving things she could think of until she was back home.

When they arrived at the merchant's house, the dog asked one more time what the girl called him. The girl was about to call him a 'A great, foul, small-tooth dog' but refrained upon seeing how hurt the dog was by the words, and remembering how patient the dog had been with her. She called him 'Sweet-as-a-honeycomb' one last time and the dog stood on his back legs and pulled off his dog's head and threw away his pelt, revealing a handsome man with the 'smallest teeth you ever saw' and the two were married.

== History of the text ==
Sidney Odall Addy's acquisition of the story was done by seeking out peasants to record their stories through dictation or copied manuscripts offered to him. He was utilizing this information to prove his personal theories about witches being spirits of the dead, citing eye-witness accounts in the countryside of fairies wearing large shrouds and ghost sightings as similar. He also believed that part of the origin of fairy-tales was a result of human ancestors believing that everything had its own separate consciousness, and that this is why many folk-tales have anthropomorphic animals and objects within them. Addy's theories didn't disprove the supernatural, but rather saw the stories compiled within his books as evidence to support his theories about the supernatural and the magical.

Addy's theories about how so many fairy-tales have similarities is that the stories are likely told and retold by merchants and peddlers from foreign nations, causing the stories to spread and change in minor ways due to a language barrier and word of mouth. His intention was based on the directive of writing and recording new folk-tales given The Folklore Society he had joined in 1895, according to him was focused entirely on republishing and reprinting old works rather than seeking new ones. He sought to use first-hand fieldwork to embrace tradition, believing the stories he collected were a sign of the enduring nature of progenitor stories and that his compilation would prevent those he perceived as falsifying tradition and from calling it into question.

== Analysis ==
=== Tale type ===
The tale is classified in the international Aarne-Thompson-Uther Index as tale type ATU 425C, "Beauty and the Beast".

In a review of Addy's publication, folklorist Edwin Sidney Hartland recognized the tale as an "English" variant of Beauty and the Beast. English folklorist Katharine M. Briggs classified the tale as type 425C. American folklorist D. L. Ashliman, in his 1987 guide to folktales, classified the story as type 425C, "Beauty and the Beast". However, Ernest Warren Baughmann, in his index of tales of England and North America, classified the tale as type 425A, "The Monster (Animal) as Bridegroom". In the same vein, Laurits Bodker, Gianfranco d'Aronco and Christina Hole classified the story as the miscellaneous type 425X, while still belonging to the same cycle.

=== Interpretations ===
The story itself was gathered in Derbyshire alongside other tales from York, Lincoln, and Nottingham, and was many of the places where Addy lived and worked publishing articles for larger companies. In a compilation of medicinal practices that Addy gathered from the area, he relayed that it was considered good if a dog licked your wounds, henceforth explaining its inclusion within the story as the merchant was recovering.

The intended message of the story could be interpreted several ways, as a comfort to women in arranged marriages that reassure the intended bride their groom won't be as foul and nasty as they believe if they shower them with love and positive reinforcement. However, the message could also be regarding empathy and being kind to others as well as keeping promises given the repeated emphasis on how the word 'Sweet-as-a-honeycomb' impact the dog's demeanor, and the girl being taken again and again because of her crying.

=== Ties to physiognomy ===
The text places a lot of emphasis on reading emotions, both that of the girl and that of the dog. In multiple instances, the girl's weeping is what inspires the dog to trek the long distance back towards the merchant's home again and again. In addition, the dog wagging its tale and the resolution of the piece are both times of emotional openness that ultimately leads to the conclusion of the story. This could have some relation to the popular practice of physiognomy at the time, wherein the study of faces and facial expressions are the resolution of the story therein.

This would point to the directive of the story to educate about empathy and understanding to teach others about being kind and using kind words, and the rewards that may come with it, such as when the girl is rewarded for her kindness with a handsome groom and coming back home at last.

== Comparisons to Beauty and the Beast ==
The text has many elements familiar within other 425C tales, including some of its major plot points. The merchant father being rescued by the Beast within the text, the heroine being taken to the Beast's grand estate and the acceptance of the Beast leading to their subsequent transformation into humanoid form. However, less time is spent within the Beast's home and more emphasis is drawn on the back and forth of the two across the countryside and the words being said therein. In addition, the elements of a force running counter to the Beauty and the Beast such as Beauty's jealous sisters, is absent from the story, as well as the requests of magical items and the instigating rose within the text.

The text seems to go out of its way to deny the opportunity of magical accompaniments, as seen within the dog's denial of the merchant's more fantastical wares. From that point on, unlike the Beast, the dog does little to shower the girl with presents and gifts, with the act of taking her back and forth regarded in higher favor and evidence of the dog's kindness and emotional recognition.

The girl also regards the dog as the patient one towards the end, despite her absence of agency, In doing so, the tale is less inclined to believe that the titles of Beauty and the Beast and pursuer and pursued can be used interchangeably. The girl is passive and compliant within the tale, and it is only through the dog's actions that the plot progresses, but it is her words that ultimately lead to a resolution. The girl has the final decision, and much like Beauty returning to Beast on the Beast's deathbed, we are led to the conclusion that this decision is hers to make, but in the case of this text it is evident that if she does not choose correctly she will be punished with further imprisonment.

In doing so, the girl acts as both heroine and saboteur to the romantic finish of the story. There is little romantic interest shown between the girl and dog, but nonetheless her relationship with the canine is integral to the removal of his bestial nature. Within the text, words literally and figuratively have the power to heal and hurt, and the romantic interlude between the two is a result not of development, but of an obligation and resolution often found in this tale and other animal bridegroom stories such as The Frog Prince.

These bridegroom stories were often the result of arranged marriages, with the bride seeing their forced groom as 'beastly' and monstrous, and stories such as these have central recurring motifs such as complacent parents, a hostile beastly captor turned human by the resolution of the story, and a relocation to a distant land. This is a result of a progenitor to these stories Cupid and Psyche, wherein the titular Psyche is sacrificed to the Gods and forced into marriage with the titular Cupid, whom she believes to be a monster until otherwise revealed. The subsequent execution in further stories is a direct result of that initial conception.

== 2007 retelling ==
An retelling of the story was published in 2007 by Margaret Read MacDonald and illustrated by Julie Paschkis. This version of the tale follows the same format and synopsis, although there are some minor word changes throughout the book and additions to the story. The jacket design for the book was done by Joy Freeman. The book was published by August House Publishers, Inc in Atlanta, Georgia. It received good reception, but is notably absent from Margaret Read MacDonald's website.

The book received positive praise at its unveiling at the Seattle Public Library, and was one of MacDonald's many works that accounted for fairy-tales and folktales from across the world.

More detail is given within the story to the dog's estate, and showing the girl and the dog spending time together. The phrase 'Sweet as a Honeycomb' doesn't come from within the return trip back to the merchant's home but comes when the girl and the dog are playing fetch. More emphasis is also drawn to the dog's hair and smell than his teeth, as shown in comparisons when the girl is petting the dog's hair and the prince's hair at the end of the text. Interestingly, they also resume their game of fetch, indicating signs of a lasting relationship and meaningful connection in contrast to the previously abrupt marriage at the end of the original tale.

=== Artwork ===
The artwork throughout the book depicts not just the original tale but also illustrations of various flowers throughout the text and multiple illustrations of a beehive and bees in reference to the recurring 'Sweet as a Honeycomb' line. These flowers are explained within the hardcover of the book in sectional illustrations detailing the meaning of each one which aligns with the scene. For example, Thistle is used in the story's opener and thistle is associated with protection and danger within the illustrations, The floral illustrations throughout the book also are in order they are presented within the hardcover, which seems intent on informing the reader about the nature of the text and the emotions felt within the characters.

These illustrations work both within the panels of the story and outside of them, and multiple floral illustrations may be used if there are multiple characters within a scene. Upon the dog and the girl first meeting, there are four flowers present. Beside the dog is a rose and daffodils, representing love and unrequited love respectively according to the illustrations, whereas besides the girl is a red columbine and sweet pea, which are fear and departure respectively. This altogether works to add more depth to the characters beyond their narrative roles.

The panels within the text will often move and bend with the characters themselves and the setting, with multiple instances of the panels twisting and turning to imitate the whiplash of movement, often bleeding out of the page. This is in contrast to more quiet and intimate moments which will be indicated with more static panels.

== See also ==
- Bearskin
- Beauty and the Beast
- The Tale of the Little Dog
