= Brother Lustig =

German fairy tale

Folk tale
- Name: Brother Lustig
- Aarne–Thompson grouping: ATU 785; ATU 753A; ATU 330B; ATU 330
- Country: Germany
- Published in: Grimms' Fairy Tales

"Brother Lustig" (Bruder Lustig) KHM 81 is a lengthy German fairy tale collected by the Brothers Grimm and published in the first edition of Kinder- und Hausmärchen (Grimm's Fairy Tales) in 1812. It contains elements of Aarne–Thompson type 785: Who Ate the Lamb's Heart?; type 753A: The Unsuccessful Resuscitation; type 330B: The Devil in the Sack; and type 330: Entering Heaven by a Trick.

== Story ==
=== Brother Lustig meets St Peter ===
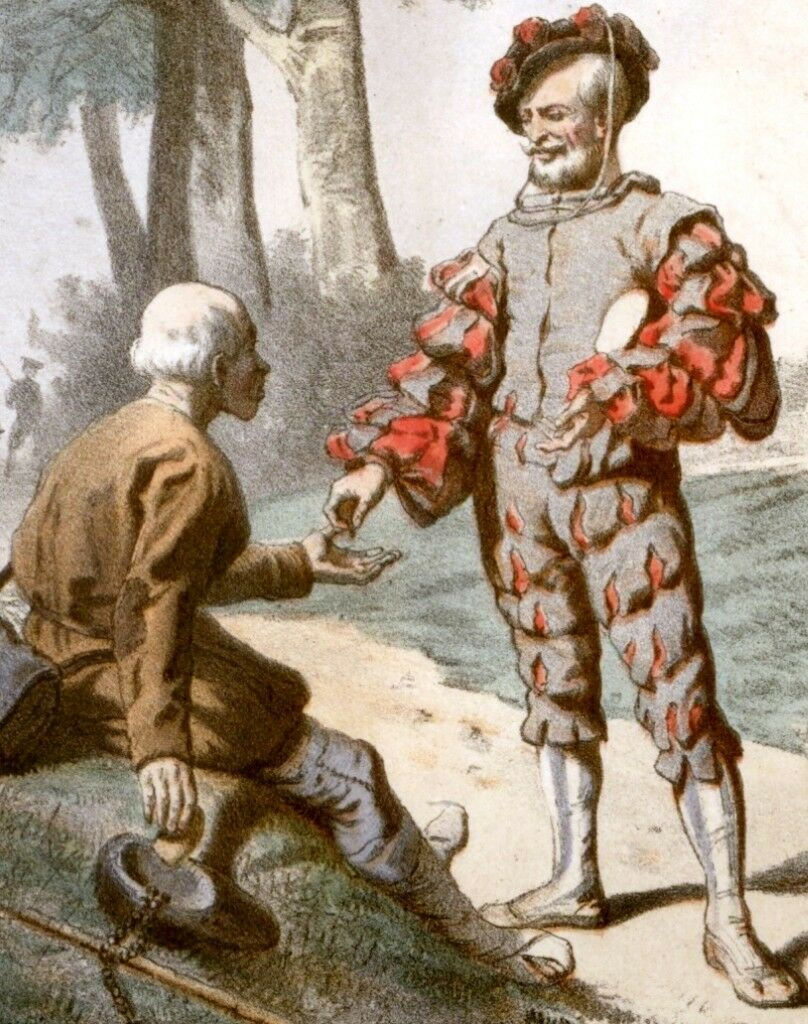
Brother Lustig gives alms to the disguised St Peter – illustration by Emil Hünten (1885)

At the end of a great and terrible war many soldiers received their discharge, and among them was Brother Lustig, who for his share of the spoils was only given a small loaf of ammunition-bread and four kreuzers. St Peter disguised himself as a poor beggar and sat in the path of Lustig as he passed by. And as Lustig came by the disguised Apostle cried out begging for alms. Lustig turned to him and said, "You poor beggar. I have nothing to offer you and am as poor as you. On my discharge from the army I received nothing but this little loaf of ammunition-bread and four kreuzers, and when they are gone I shall be in the same state as you. Yet I will give you something." And taking his loaf he divided it into quarters, one of which he gave to the beggar, together with one kreuzer. At this St Peter thanked him and on walking off disguised himself as a different beggar and again sat in the path of Lustig as he passed by. And when Lustig came up he begged him for alms, as before.

And as before Brother Lustig gave him a quarter of the loaf and one kreuzer. St Peter thanked him as before and went on his way, but disguised himself as a poor beggar for the third time, and again sat by the side of the road where he waited for Lustig to pass by. He when he saw the poor beggar gave him the third quarter of the loaf and the third kreuzer, leaving himself just the last quarter of the loaf and the last kreuzer. And with these Brother Lustig went into a nearby inn where he ate his piece of bread and ordered one kreuzer's worth of beer to wash it down. Thus refreshed he resumed his journey when he again encountered St Peter, who this time was disguised as a discharged soldier. He asked Lustig, "Like you I am a discharged soldier. Have you any bread or a kreuzer with which I could get a drink?"

"How can I help you?", replied Brother Lustig. "When I was discharged I received nothing but a loaf of ammunition-bread and four kreuzers. I met three beggars on the road and gave each a quarter of the bread and a coin each. The last quarter of the loaf I ate and the last coin I used to buy beer in the inn. Now I have nothing left – but if you too have nothing then we should go begging together."

"That will not be necessary", said St Peter, "for I am skilled in medicine, and I am sure from that I can earn enough for both our needs. Whatever I may receive you shall have half."

=== Miraculous cure ===
The two set off together and came to a peasant's house from which they heard loud moaning and crying. Going in they found a man in his death agonies while his wife sat weeping loudly beside him. "Stop that noise!", said St Peter. "I will cure your husband." And from his pocket he took a salve which he applied and cured the man at once. The couple were delighted and asked what reward they could pay, but St Peter refused their offer, and the more they pressed him the more he refused. But Brother Lustig, watching all this, nudged St Peter in the ribs and muttered under his breath, " Take something, for it is certain we need it." And the woman bringing out a lamb offered it to the Apostle – but still he refused. Again Lustig nudged him in the ribs and said, "You must take it, you fool, for it is certain that we need it!" And St Peter relented, and said "Very well, I will accept the lamb but I will not carry it." With that Brother Lustig lifted the lamb onto his own shoulders and the two left the lowly home and went with the lamb into the woods.

=== The lamb's heart ===
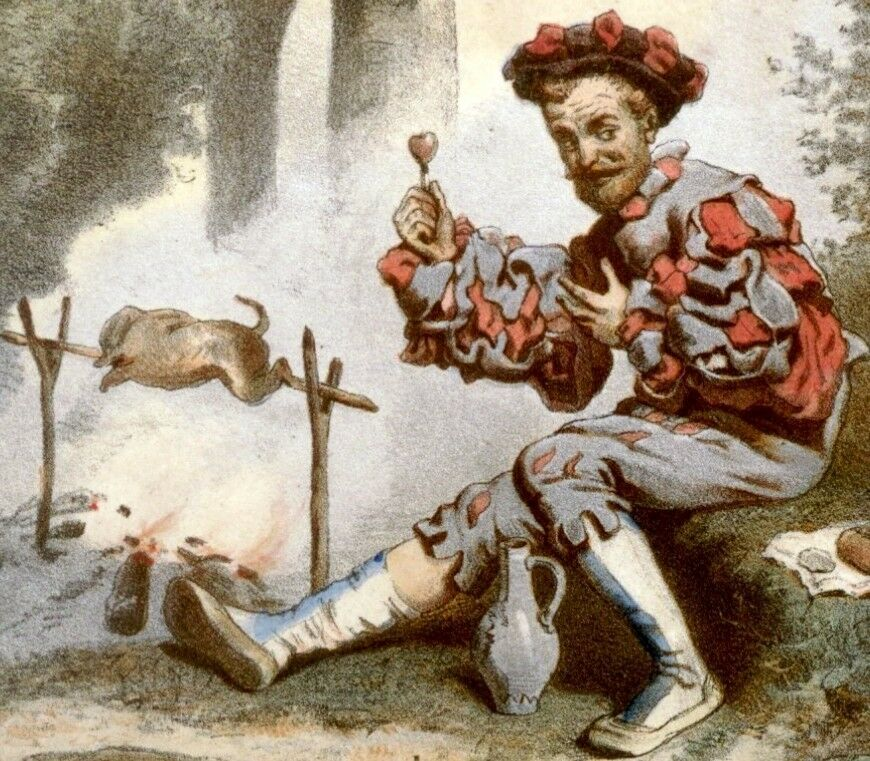
Brother Lustig finds the lamb heart – illustration by Emil Hünten (1885)

By now Brother Lustig was hungry, and he turned to St Peter and said, "This looks as good a place as any to rest and cook the lamb." St Peter replied, "Do as you wish, but I must not take part in the cooking of the lamb. Here is a pot and while you prepare the meal I will take a walk until it is ready. But do not eat any of it until I come back." And as he left Brother Lustig killed and butchered the lamb, putting the pieces in the boiling pot. When the lamb was cooked Brother Lustig took it from the pot and cutting the meat into smaller pieces found the heart. "The heart is said to be the best part of a lamb", Brother Lustig said to himself, as he tasted it. But not being able to stop himself he ate it all. Just then St Peter returned, saying, "I see the lamb is prepared. You can have it all to yourself, apart from the heart. I will have just that."

Taking a knife and fork Brother Lustig pretended to dig amongst the pieces of meat for the heart, and turning to St Peter said, "There is no heart here."

"Where can the heart be?", asked the Apostle.

"We are fools to look for the lamb's heart", replied Brother Lustig, "for it is a well-known fact that lambs do not have hearts."

"Surely every living thing has a heart, so how can the lamb have none?", questioned St Peter.

"If you think about it seriously it is obvious it is true", answered Lustig. After St Peter had pondered, he said, "Well, if what you say is true then I want none of the lamb. You can eat it all." Brother Lustig thought that he would eat half the lamb at once and take the rest for later in his knapsack. And they walked on further together until St Peter created a great river to flow across their way which they had to cross. St Peter turning to Brother Lustig said, "You go first." But Lustig, looking at the mighty torrent of water, feared that it would sweep him away. "No, I think it better if you go first", he replied. And St Peter strode into the water, which just reached to his knees, and seeing that it was safe Brother Lustig followed him in – but the water came straightway up to his neck, and he cried out, "Oh, my brother, help me for I am drowning!"

St. Peter said, "Do you confess that you ate the lamb's heart?" But Lustig answered, "No, I did not eat it." And the water got deeper and deeper until it filled his mouth. "Oh, my brother," Lustig cried, "help me for I am drowning!" And again St. Peter said, "Do you confess that you ate the lamb's heart?" But again Lustig answered, "No, I did not eat it." St Peter would not let Brother Lustig drown, and he caused the water to drop and pulled his companion from it.

=== Raising the princess ===
And they travelled on together, with Brother Lustig having no suspicion as to his companion's true nature. Coming into a kingdom they heard that the king's daughter was sick unto death. Brother Lustig said to St Peter, "Here is a great chance for us. If you can heal the princess we will be set for life. Come, let us go quickly". But St Peter walked more and more slowly, which irritated Lustig. On receiving news that the princess was dead Brother Lustig angrily snapped at St Peter, "Now we have missed our chance! And all because of your dawdling!"

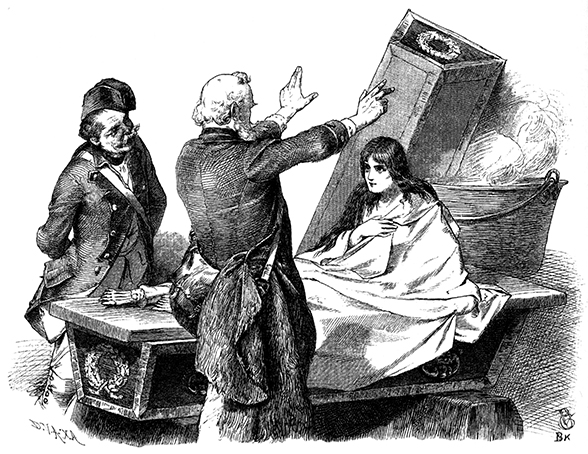
St Peter raises the princess from death – illustration by Philipp Grot Johann (1893)

"Be quiet!" replied St Peter. "I don't just heal people – I can also raise the dead!"

"Well", said Brother Lustig, "if that's true we have nothing to worry about. But if you can we should ask for at least half the kingdom as a reward!" And passing into the royal palace where everyone was in deep mourning St Peter went to the king and said he could bring his daughter back to life. On being taken to where the young girl lay St Peter said, "Bring me a pot and some water and then leave us." When everyone but Brother Lustig had left St Peter went to the body and cut off all the limbs, which he dropped into the water in the pot. Then lighting a fire beneath the pot he boiled the limbs until all the flesh and muscle dropped off them. Taking the clean white bones he arranged them in their proper place on a table, and stepping forward, in a loud voice he called out,"In the name of the Holy Trinity, little girl arise!" At the third time of calling the princess sat up, restored to full life.

The king was overjoyed at finding his daughter alive again, and said to St. Peter, "Anything you desire I will give to you, up to half my kingdom." But St Peter said, "I want no reward for what I have done.". Brother Lustig nudging his companion sharply in the ribs said, "Don't be a fool! If you don't want anything, I do!" The king seeing that Brother Lustig desired a reward ordered that his knapsack be filled with gold. And the two left the palace, and coming to a clearing in a woodland St Peter said, "Now is the time to share the gold." And taking it he divided it into three heaps, which puzzled Brother Lustig as there were but two of them. But St Peter said, "I have divided the gold equally. One share for me, one share for you, and a third share for he who ate the lamb's heart."

"Oh, that is easily sorted", replied Brother Lustig, sweeping up two heaps of gold, "I ate it!"

"But that can't be true", said St Peter, "for it is a well-known fact that a lamb has no heart!"

"Don't be ridiculous!", retorted Brother Lustig. "Of course lambs have hearts, as do all animals, else how could they live?" St Peter answered, "Well, so be it. You may keep all the gold for yourself, but I will not travel with you any further. You go your way and I will go mine." Brother Lustig replied, "Whatever you like, my brother. Goodbye." And the two went their separate ways; but Lustig was not sorry to part with his companion, who he thought a strange saint.

=== Failure of Brother Lustig ===
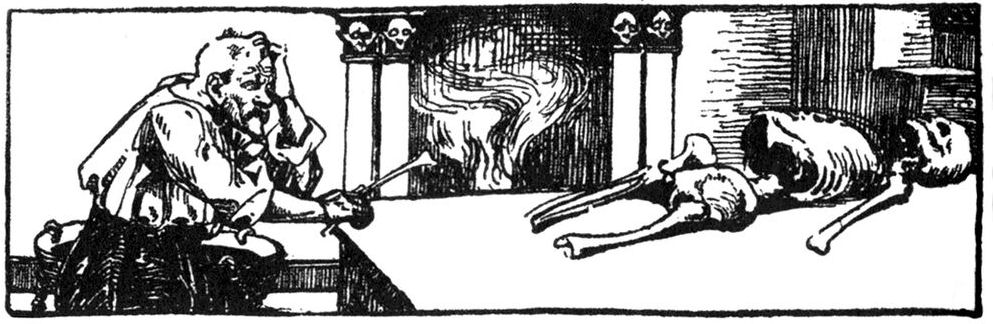
Brother Lustig tries to sort the bones – Wilhelm Stumpf (1901)

Brother Lustig gave much of his gold away and spent the rest, so that soon there was none left. And he came to a country where he heard news that the king's daughter had just died. "Ah", he said to himself, "this might work out well for me. If I can restore her to life I will ask for half the kingdom as my reward." So going to the king he offered to raise the dead girl to life. The king had heard news that a discharged soldier had raised a dead princess in a neighbouring kingdom and thought maybe this was Brother Lustig. But being uncertain he questioned his councillors as to what to do, who advised him that he might as well try as he had nothing to lose.

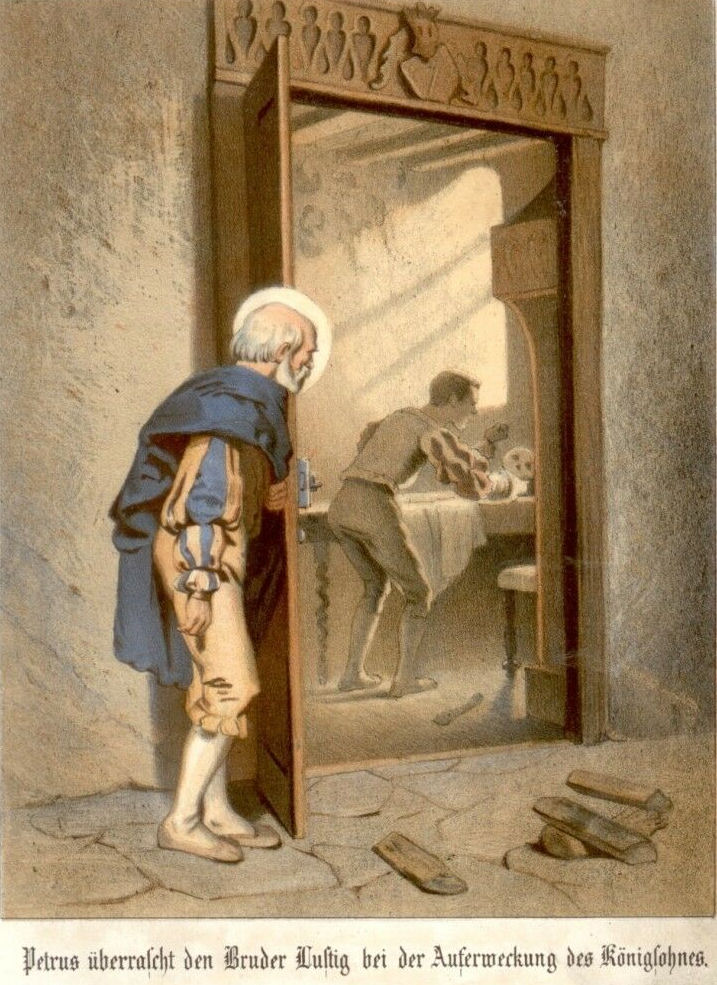
St Peter discovers Brother Lustig confusing the bones

Brother Lustig ordered a pot and some water, and after sending everyone out, he cut the limbs from the dead princess and dropped them in the boiling water until the flesh and muscle dropped from the bones. Then taking the white bones he laid them out on a table, as he had seen St Peter do, but not knowing the correct order he lay them in the wrong place. Then, in a loud voice he cried out, "In the name of the Holy Trinity, little girl arise!" This he commanded three times, but the bones did not arise, and Brother Lustig in a panic cried, "Get up, get up, or you will be sorry!" Just then St Peter returned in his former guise as a discharged soldier. Climbing through the window, he demanded "You Godless man! What are you doing? The girl will not arise as you have laid her bones in a confused state! This once I will help you, but you must never do such a thing again and you must accept no reward, no matter how small, from the king."

Then, laying out the bones correctly, St Peter cried out three times, "In the name of the Holy Trinity, little girl arise", and with that the princess sat up in full health. St Peter at once left by the window, and while Brother Lustig was happy that the young girl was restored to life he was annoyed that he could take no reward for it. "How dare he", he mused, "for he gives with one hand but takes with the other. It makes no sense at all!" And when the king in his gratitude offered him anything his heart might desire as a reward Brother Lustig was afraid to accept anything, but managed to convey, by various winks and hints, that he would accept his knapsack being filled with gold. And this the king did. But outside was waiting St Peter, who said to Lustig, "What sort of man are you? Did I not forbid you to take any reward, no matter how small?" But Brother Lustig answered, "What can you do when people just put things in your knapsack without your knowledge?" And the Apostle warned him that if he ever did anything like it again he would be sorry, adding "But one thing I will grant you, that whatever you wish to be in the knapsack will be there", and then St Peter departed, and Brother Lustig was relieved to see him go.

=== Brother Lustig and the knapsack ===
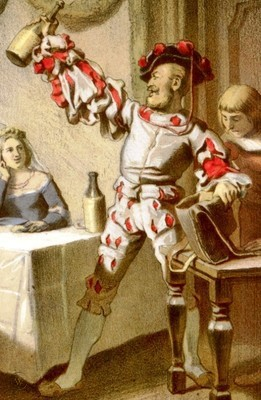
Brother Lustig orders wine with the last of his money – illustration by Emil Hünten (1885)

And Brother Lustig squandered his gold, as before, so that he was down to his last four kreuzers, and going into an inn he ordered three kreuzers worth of wine and one kreuzers worth of bread, and as he sat and ate his bread and drank his wine the smell of roasting goose wafted to his nose, and looking around saw two geese in an oven. Then he recalled what his fellow-traveller had told him, that whatever he wished for would appear in his knapsack. And going out, he said to himself, "I wish for those two roasted geese to leave that oven and be in my knapsack." On looking in his knapsack he saw the two roasted geese within, and going to a meadow he sat and ate one.

While he was eating his fill of the first goose two men approached who looked with hunger at the second goose. "Take it", said Brother Lustig, "for this one is enough for me". And they thanked him and took it to the inn where they ordered wine to wash it down. While they were eating their meal the innkeeper's wife saw them, and calling her husband said, "Go and check that those two fellows are not eating one of our geese." The innkeeper looking in the oven saw his geese were gone and rushed over to the two men, shouting angrily, "Why, you rogues! Did you think you would eat my goose for free? Pay up or I will thrash you!"

"We are no thieves!", protested the two men. "This goose was given to us by the discharged soldier sitting in the meadow." But not believing them the innkeeper grabbed a stick and beat them out of the door.

=== The Dancing Devils ===
Brother Lustig continuing on his way came upon a beautiful castle in the shadow of which was a rundown inn. Going into the inn Lustig demanded a room, but was told none could be had for every room was taken by a nobleman. "Why do these fine lords stay here and not in yonder castle?", asked Brother Lustig. "None may spend the night there", said the innkeeper, "for whoever tries will always die." Brother Lustig looked at the castle, and turning to the innkeeper said, "If others have tried it so will I. Give me the key and some bread and wine for my supper." And with these he entered the castle where, after eating his simple meal, he settled down for the night, using his knapsack as a pillow.

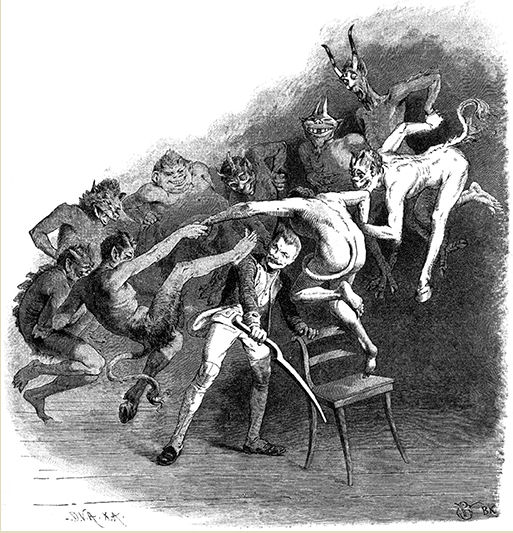
Brother Lustig encounters the devils – illustration by Philipp Grot Johann (1893)

During the night he was awoken by a great noise, and on opening his eyes beheld nine loathsome devils dancing in a circle about him. "Dance all night if you wish", he cried out, "but come no closer!" But the devils danced nearer and nearer to him, almost treading on his face with their cloven hooves. And in his anger Lustig grabbed a chair leg from the floor and swung it at the devils, but they seized him by the hair and pulled with all their might. "Devils, you go too far", he cried, "into the knapsack with you!" And with that all nine found themselves inside it, and Brother Lustig fastened it up tight and threw it into a corner, and laying down again, he slept until dawn. The innkeeper and the noblemen coming to take away Lustig's dead body were astonished to find him alive and the devils secured in his knapsack. The noblemen thanked him and gave him rewards and begged him to stay, but Brother Lustig said he must be on his way.

Brother Lustig finding a blacksmith told the men there to strike his knapsack with their heavy hammers as hard as they could. This they did with all their strength, to the pitiable howls of the devils inside. And when Lustig peeked inside the bag he saw that eight of the devils were dead, while the ninth, more dead than alive, slipped out of the bag and crawled back to Hell.

=== The Road to Heaven ===
And after his long travels around the world Brother Lustig grew old, and going to a holy hermit, he said, "I am old and weary now, but I have had many adventures. Now it is time for me to think of the end. How do I get into Heaven?" And the hermit answered, "There are two roads: one is wide and pleasant but leads to Hell. The other is rough and narrow, and leads to Heaven." Brother Lustig pondered, "I would be an idiot to take the rough and narrow road. I will go the other way." So, walking along the wide and pleasant road in time he came to a great black door – the Door to Hell. Brother Lustig knocked on the door, which was opened by the doorkeeper, who on seeing Brother Lustig shook with fear, for it was the same ninth devil who had escaped from his knapsack. And quickly bolting the door against Brother Lustig he ran to the Devil himself, and said, "There is a fellow at the door demanding to be let in. But whatever you do you must not let him in, for he shall wish the whole of Hell into his knapsack, which I can speak of, for I have received a hammering within it!"

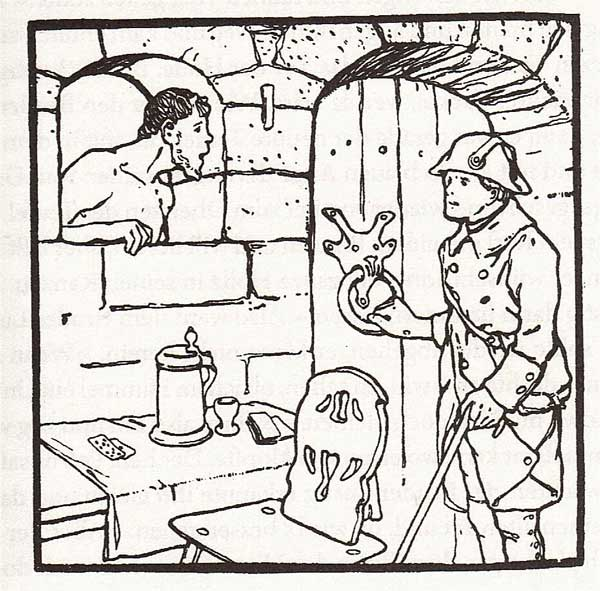
Brother Lustig at Hell's door – Illustration by Otto Ubbelohde

So the Devil and his cohort of devils went to the door and cried out, "Go away, for we do not want you in here!" Brother Lustig said to himself, "Well, if they won't have me here I must try the other place, for I must have somewhere to go." So he turned around and resumed his travels until he came to the Gates of Heaven, upon which he knocked. When St Peter came to the gates Brother Lustig recognised him as his fellow-discharged soldier. "This is better", he said to himself, "for here is my old friend who will surely let me in." But St Peter said, "I don't think that Heaven is the right place for you", and Brother Lustig answered, "I must go somewhere, brother. They wouldn't let me into Hell, so I will have to come in here. But if you will not let me enter then take back your knapsack, for I want nothing that you have given me." And this he handed to the Apostle, who took it and hung it beside him. Brother Lustig said, "I wish I was in the knapsack" and just like that he was in Heaven and St Peter could not turn him out.

== Analysis ==
The tale of Brother Lustig is a long story involving a large cast of characters and various elements of the Aarne–Thompson type 785: Who Ate the Lamb's Heart?; type 753A: The Unsuccessful Resuscitation; type 330B: The Devil in the Sack; and type 330: Entering Heaven by a Trick. In German 'lustig' can mean 'funny' or 'merry' and 'lazy'. The Brothers Grimm tell two stories in which the main characters try to fool the Devil, St Peter and God – Brother Lustig and Gambling Hansel (De Spielhansl), KHM 82. The tale concerns a man who starts out as charitable and caring, sharing three quarters of all he possesses with what he thinks is a series of poor beggars – in reality St Peter – who at first is impressed with Brother Lustig and decides to travel with him. But the two quickly go off each other as St Peter discovers that his companion lies and steals and disobeys a saint while Brother Lustig regards his fellow-traveller as a fool for refusing generous rewards. However, despite these character flaws Brother Lustig still manages to cheat his way into heaven.

A large number of speeches characterize Brother Lustig's practical thinking, his generosity and his attitude towards saints and devils, while the tale contains various motifs common in fairy tales, including a magical bag or knapsack and the ability of characters to be able to change their appearance. The Brothers Grimm had the tale from Georg Passy, who heard it from an old woman in Vienna. From a version from Hessen the Brothers took the section concerning Brother Lustig arguing that a lamb has no heart.

A poem from Achim von Arnim's Master Songs (No. 232) of 1550 has a soldier begging for food while his companion St Peter wants to preach. St. Peter heals the local mayor for which he is rewarded with thirty guilders and a chicken, which they cook. Peter's soldier companion secretly eats the liver from the chicken that Peter wanted for himself. The soldier confesses when Peter divides the thirty guilders reward into three parts, the third part being for whoever had eaten the liver.

A version of the story from 1658 was cited in a court case that year when nailer's apprentice Johannes Zyder was charged with telling a blasphemous joke at the Saffran inn in Zürich. Zyder had been asked to explain why Swabians were described as "liver-eaters". His joke about a Swabian and God may be described as an ancestor of Brother Lustg. This version tells how God is disguised as a man who buys a lamb and tells the Swabian to cook it but to save the liver. When God is called away to raise a dead person at a funeral for which he receives a hundred guilders the Swabian secretly eats the lamb's liver and when challenged as to where it is says it had no liver. In the next village the Swabian attempts to raise a dead person and when he does not succeed the locals plan to execute him. God saves his companion by helping the Swabian to raise the dead person. The Swabian only confesses to eating the liver when God divides the wages into three parts, including one share for him who had eaten the liver. The Swabian confesses he ate the liver, and takes two parts of the reward.

== See also ==
- The Devil's Sooty Brother
