= Bearskin (film) =

1986 film by Walter Beck

Der Bärenhäuter
- Directed by: Walter Beck
- Written by: Jacob Grimm; Wilhelm Grimm; Eva Görsch; Walter Beck; Thea Richter
- Starring: Jens-Uwe Bogadtke; Manfred Heine; Janina Hartwig; Hans Teuscher
- Cinematography: Günter Heimann
- Edited by: Ilse Peters
- Music by: Günther Fischer
- Release date: 24 January 1986
- Running time: 81 minutes
- Country: East Germany
- Language: German

Der Bärenhäuter is an East German movie from the year 1986, based on the fairy tale Bearskin.

== Plot ==
The war has ended and soldier Christoffel has no future and no money. He does not know what to do, because he meets the devil. He offers him a deal: Christoffel's pockets will always be full of money, but he cannot wash himself for seven years, not the hair and nails and he can sleep in a bed. If he does not comply with all of these things, he will be devoted forever to the devil.

Christoffel accepts the condition.

Suddenly a rich man, Christoffel has nothing to worry about any more. Soon, however, he is lonely. Society shuns him because he's dirty, unkempt and smelly. The only place to stay he can find is a prison.

By paying off the debts of a goldsmith, he wins the heart of Catherine, the man's daughter. However, conscious of his awful appearance, Christoffel leaves her.

After seven years, he returns to her as well-groomed gentleman.
