= Sidney Oldall Addy =

English author

- Born: 9 January 1848; Norton, Derbyshire
- Died: 15 November 1933 (aged 85); Orsett Terrace, City of Westminster, London
- Education: Lincoln College, Oxford
- Occupation: solicitor
- Spouse: Mary Golden Parkin
- Parent(s): James and Sarah Addy

Sidney Oldall Addy (9 January 1848 – 15 November 1933) was an English author of books on folklore and history. He was born in Norton, Derbyshire, to coal merchant and landowner James Addy and his wife, Sarah. He studied classics at Lincoln College, Oxford, before becoming a solicitor. In 1899 he married Mary Golden Parkin.

As well as publishing many books on history and folklore he was known for contributing papers to antiquarian journals and for his letters to Notes and Queries. He also wrote articles for the Dictionary of National Biography. As well as publishing many books on history and folklore he was known for contributing papers to antiquarian journals[1] and for his letters to Notes and Queries.[3] He also wrote articles for the Dictionary of National Biography.

== Works ==
- An account of Winfield Manor in Derbyshire, with James Croston (1885)
- Historical Memorials of Beauchief Abbey (1887)
- A glossary of words used in the neighbourhood of Sheffield (1888)
- The Hall of Waltheof (1893)
- Household Tales and Traditional Remains (1895)
- The Evolution of the English House (1898)
- Church and Manor: A Study in English Economic History (1913)
- Folk Tales and Superstitions
