= The Devil's Sooty Brother =

German fairy tale

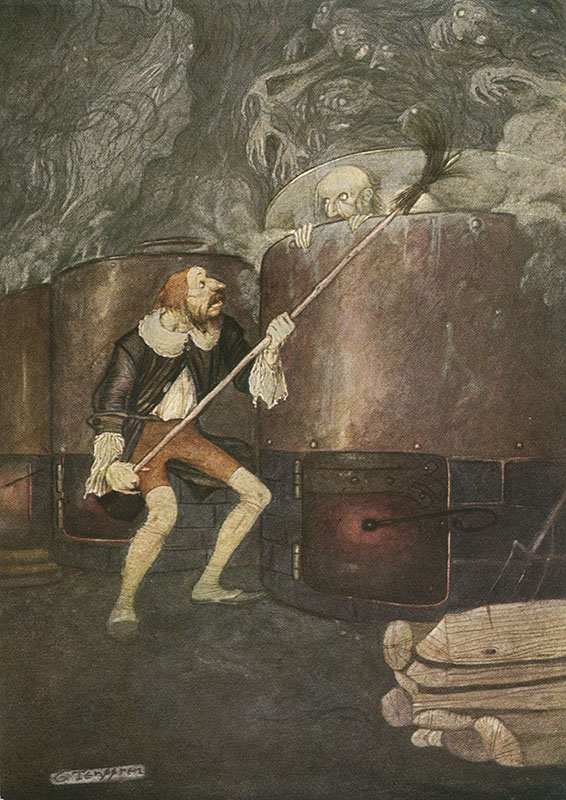
- And he lifted the lid of the pot and peeked inside - illustration by Gustaf Tenggren (1922)

Folk tale
- Name: The Devil's Sooty Brother
- Aarne–Thompson grouping: ATU 475
- Country: Germany
- Published in: Grimms' Fairy Tales

"The Devil's Sooty Brother" (German: Des Teufels rußiger Bruder) KHM 100 is a German fairy tale collected by the Brothers Grimm and published in the second edition of Kinder- und Hausmärchen (Grimm's Fairy Tales) in 1819. It is a tale of Aarne–Thompson type 475, "Heating Hell's Kitchen", or "The Man as Heater of Hell's Kettle".

== Story ==
A soldier named Hans was discharged from the army but found himself without any money and no idea what to do. While walking in a forest wondering how he could improve his situation he came across a little man. He did not know it, but the little man was the Devil in disguise. The little man said to him, "What is wrong, that you look so sad?"

The soldier replied, "I am hungry and have no money with which to buy food."

And the Devil said to him, "Let me employ you as my servant and you will never want for anything again for as long as you shall live. Serve me for seven years, and after that you will be free. And I will teach you to play beautiful music. But one requirement I have is that during that time you must never wash yourself, never comb your hair, never cut or trim your hair or your nails or wipe the tears from your eyes." The soldier thought it over for a moment, and thinking it a good bargain agreed the little man's terms and he went with the little man, who straight off led him down into Hell.

In Hell the little man told him that his duties were to keep the fires burning under the pots in which the hell-broth stewed, make sure the house was kept clean and tidy, to sweep all the dust and dirt behind the doors and make sure that everything was kept in order. But the little man warned him he must never look into the pots or he would be sorry for it.

The soldier said, "All that is fine. I will carry out your orders as if I was still in the army." With that the little man left the house and the soldier began his duties. Although it was already very hot he lit a fire and swept all the dust and dirt behind the door, just as he had been told to do.

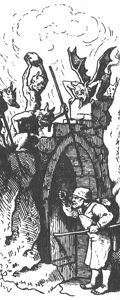
The soldier began his duties in Radin's house

When the Devil returned he looked around the house to see if his instructions had been followed properly, and seeing that they had been he was pleased and went out again. The soldier decided that in the Devil's absence it was time for him to have a good look around Hell, and he saw that all the pots were boiling away with a good fire beneath them. He would have liked to have a peek inside them, except the Devil had strictly forbidden this. However, the urge became too much and he lifted the lid of the nearest pot and peeked inside - and there he saw his old sergeant sitting in the boiling hell-broth. "Well, well," he said "so there you are! Once you had me in your power, but now the boot is on the other foot!" And with that he dropped the lid back onto the pot and stoked the hell-fire while adding more wood.

Then he moved to the next pot, lifting the lid as before and peeking inside where he discovered his old captain inside the pot. "Well, well," he said "so there you are! Once you had me in your power, but now the boot is on the other foot!" And with that again he dropped the lid back onto the pot and stoked the hell-fire while adding more wood.

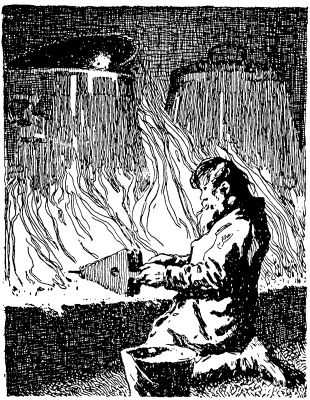
And he stoked the hell-fire to boil the hell-broth - illustration by Otto Ubbelohde (1909)

His curiosity having him firmly in its grip, he moved to the third pot, lifting the lid as before and peeking inside he discovered his old general. "Well, well," he said "so there you are! Once you had me in your power, but now the boot is on the other foot!" And with that he dropped the lid back onto the pot and stoked the hell-fire while adding more wood.

During his seven years in Hell never once did the soldier wash, comb, or trim himself, or cut his hair or nails, or wipe the tears from his eyes, and it seemed to him that the seven years flew past as if they were only six months. And when his time was up the Devil came to him and said, "Now, Hans, how have you occupied your time in Hell?"

"Well", he replied, "I have followed your orders to the letter, like the old soldier I am. I have stoked the fires under the pots and I have swept the dust and dirt behind the doors."

"Ah", said the Devil, "but you have also peeked inside the pots. It is lucky for you that you stoked the fires and added more wood beneath them or your life would have been mine! However, your time is up so I expect you want to go home?"

"Yes," replied the old soldier. "I would like to see how my old father is getting on." The Devil said, "I promised you that you would never want for anything again. Fill your knapsack with all the dust and dirt you swept behind the doors. When you leave you must go unwashed with your hair and nails uncut and with weak eyes. And if anyone asks you where you have come from, you must answer 'From Hell'. And when they ask you who you are you are to answer, 'I am the Devil's sooty brother, and my king as well'."

The soldier held his tongue and did not complain about his wages as he wished to in his disappointment, but when he was back in the forest he opened the knapsack to empty it of the heavy load of dust and dirt and discovered that it had changed to gold. Pleased now with his wages he went into a nearby town to search for an inn. But the innkeeper on seeing Hans was terrified of the unwashed and untrimmed scarecrow-like creature approaching him. And he called out to Hans and asked, "From where do you come?"

"From Hell."

"And who are you?", asked the innkeeper.

"The Devil's sooty brother, and my king as well." And on hearing these answers the innkeeper refused to let him in, but when Han showed him the gold in his knapsack the innkeeper threw open the door. Hans ordered the best room and ate and drank until he was full, but he neither washed nor cut his hair or nails, just as the Devil had told him, and he lay down to sleep. But all the innkeeper downstairs could think of was the knapsack full of gold, and while Hans slept the innkeeper crept into his room and stole it.

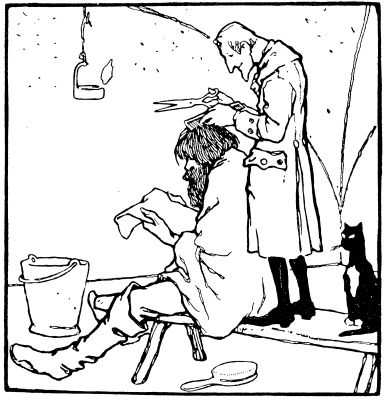
And the Devil cut his hair and nails, and washed the tears from his eyes - illustration by Otto Ubbelohde (1909)

When Hans awoke in the morning he thought that he must pay the innkeeper and be on his way, but on getting up from his bed he found that the knapsack was gone. And he left the inn and went back to Hell and told the Devil what had happened to him, and begged him for his help. And the Devil said, "Do not worry yourself. Sit here and I will wash you, and cut your hair and nails, and wipe the tears from your eyes." When he had done these things he gave the old soldier another knapsack full of the sweepings of dust and dirt and said, "Go back to the innkeeper and tell him to return your gold or I will come out from Hell and fetch him here and he shall poke the fire and sweep the floor in your place."

Hans went back to the inn and said to the landlord, "You stole my gold and if you do not return it you will go to Hell and take my place, and you will look unwashed and untrimmed, as did I." And the innkeeper in his terror gave him back his gold, and even more than he had stolen, and he begged Hans not to tell anyone. And Hans left the inn a rich man who would never want for anything again. He bought himself a shabby smock to wear so that people would not think he had gold in his knapsack, and he went about the country making the beautiful music that the Devil had taught him in Hell.

In that country there was an old king who on hearing of the beautiful music played by Hans had the old soldier brought before him. And the king loved his playing so much he declared that Hans would marry his oldest daughter. But she was scornful of being married to a common man in a shabby smock, saying "I would rather throw myself into the deepest water and drown than marry such a fellow!" So instead the king gave his youngest daughter in marriage to Hans, who was pleased to do it out of love for her father. And so the Devil's sooty brother married the king's daughter, and when the old king died Hans became king, just as the Devil had predicted.

== Analysis ==
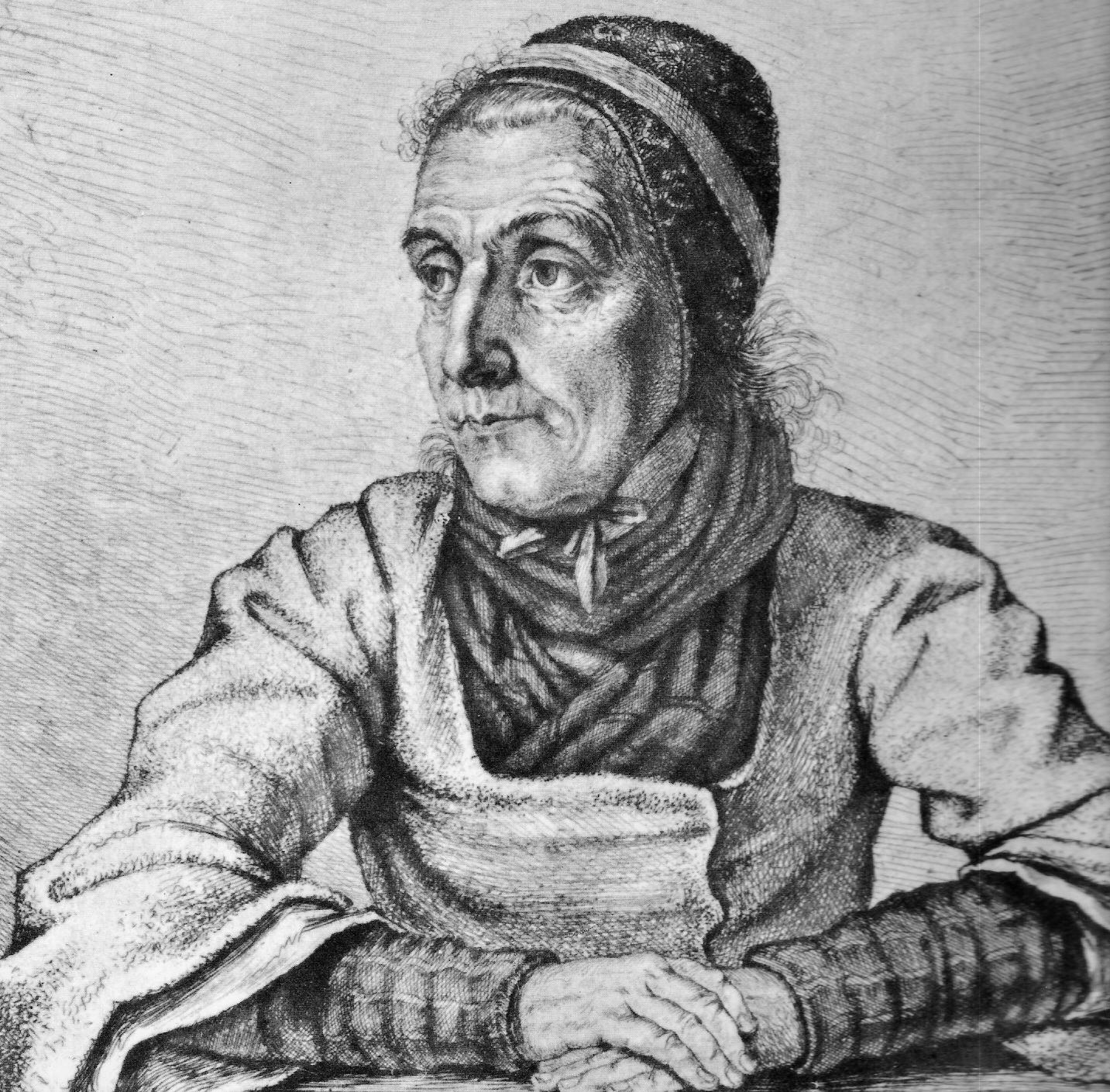
Dorothea Viehmann, contemporary portrait by Ludwig Emil Grimm, a brother of Wilhelm and Jacob Grimm.

The Brothers Grimm most likely obtained the story from Dorothea Viehmann, with whom they became acquainted in 1813. She told them more than forty tales and variations. Because of Viehmann's Huguenot ancestors, a number of her stories are based on French fairy tales. Wilhelm Grimm wrote that it was an amazing coincidence that he and his brother had met this woman. The brothers were especially impressed that Viehmann could retell her stories again and again without changing a word.

In this tale a soldier who is down on his luck makes a deal with the Devil - but, unlike Faust in the German legend who loses his soul in a bargain with the Devil, here the soldier agrees to serve the Devil for seven years in return for a reward and his freedom. Where we expect the Devil to be vengeful when the soldier disobeys him by peeking inside the pots he is only concerned that the soldier has carried out his duties by stoking the hell-fires and sweeping the dust behind the doors. But unlike God in the Old Testament who punishes those who disobey him, in this tale the Devil understands the curiosity of human nature and is forgiving.

== See also ==
- Brother Lustig
