= Bearskin Lake =

Bearskin Lake may refer to:

== Lakes ==
- Canada
  - Bearskin Lake (British Columbia), Cassiar Land District, British Columbia
  - Bearskin Lake (Nova Scotia), Hants County, Nova Scotia
  - Bearskin Lake (Kenora District), Ontario
  - Bearskin Lake (Thunder Bay District), Ontario
- United States
  - Bearskin Lake (Minnesota), Cooks County, Minnesota

== Settlements ==
- Bearskin Lake First Nation in Ontario, Canada
