= The Iron Stove =

Fairy tale collected by the Brothers Grimm

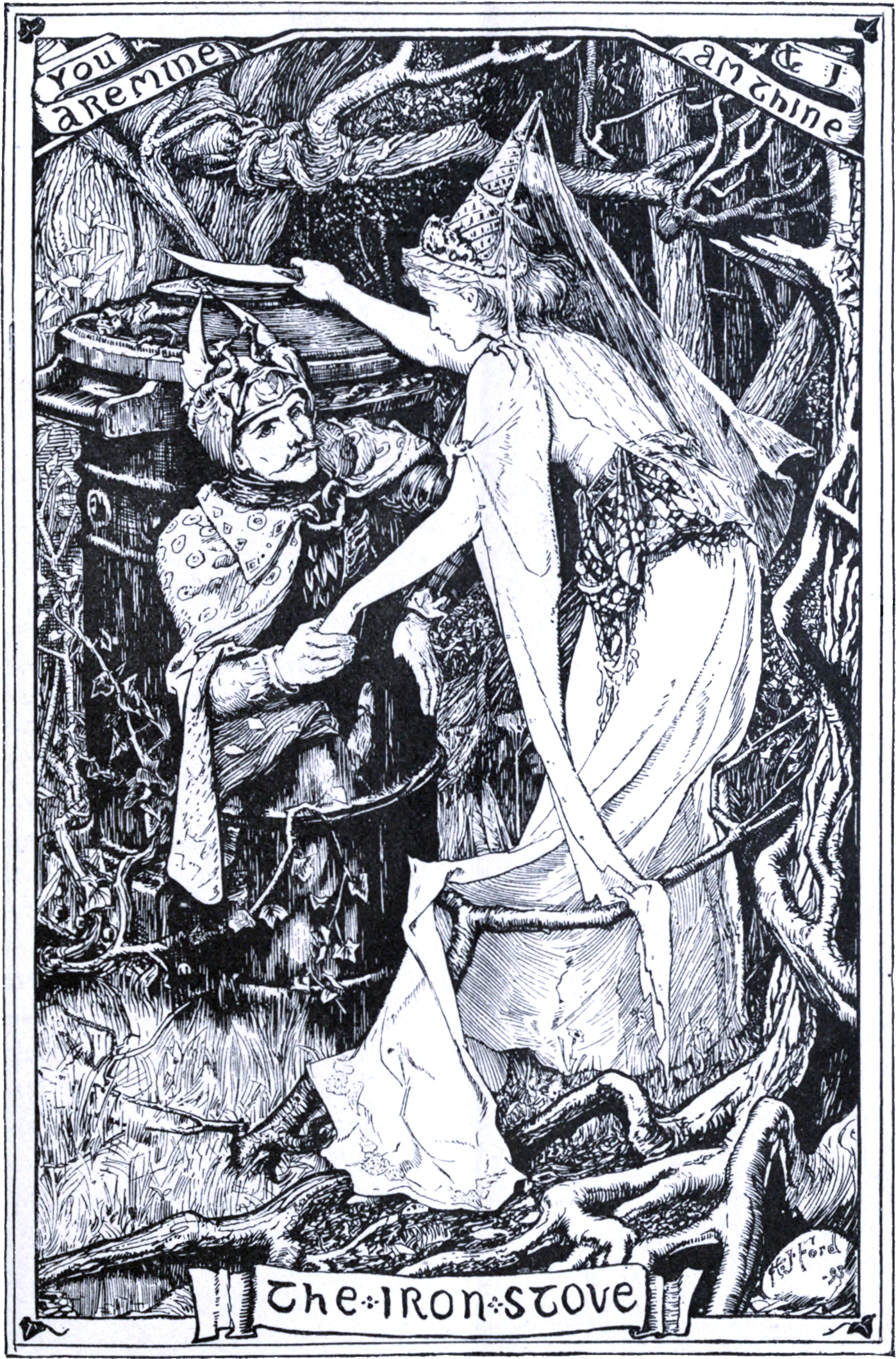
- The prince climbs out of the stove. Illustration from The Yellow Fairy Book (1894).

Folk tale
- Name: The Iron Stove
- Aarne–Thompson grouping: ATU 425A, "The Animal (Monster) as Bidegroom"
- Country: Germany
- Published in: Kinder- und Hausmärchen by The Brothers Grimm

"The Iron Stove" (German: Der Eisenofen) is a fairy tale collected by the Brothers Grimm, as tale number 127. It is Aarne–Thompson type 425A, "The Animal (Monster) as Bridegroom". Dorothea Viehmann prepared the story for the Grimms' collection.

== Synopsis ==
A prince is cursed by a witch and imprisoned in an iron stove in the woods. A lost princess finds the stove and is surprised to find it talking to her, offering to help her find her way back home, provided she return to the woods with a knife to scrape a hole in the stove, thereby freeing the prince, and marry him.

Her father the King, not wanting to give up his only child to a stove in the woods, tries to send substitutes back to the woods including a miller's daughter and a pig-herd's daughter. Although very beautiful, the women betray their origins, and the princess herself reluctantly returns to the woods. When she scrapes with the knife to make a hole, she sees that the prince is very handsome. He wants to take her to his own country, but she wishes to first bid her father farewell. He agrees, but tells her to speak no more than three words. She fails this prohibition, and can not find the iron stove.

In the woods, she finds a cottage full of toads and frogs. They give her shelter for the night, tell her how to find the prince—by climbing a high glass mountain, and crossing three piercing swords and a great lake—and give her gifts—three large needles, a plough-wheel, and three nuts. She uses the needles to climb the glass mountain and rolls over the swords on the plough-wheel.

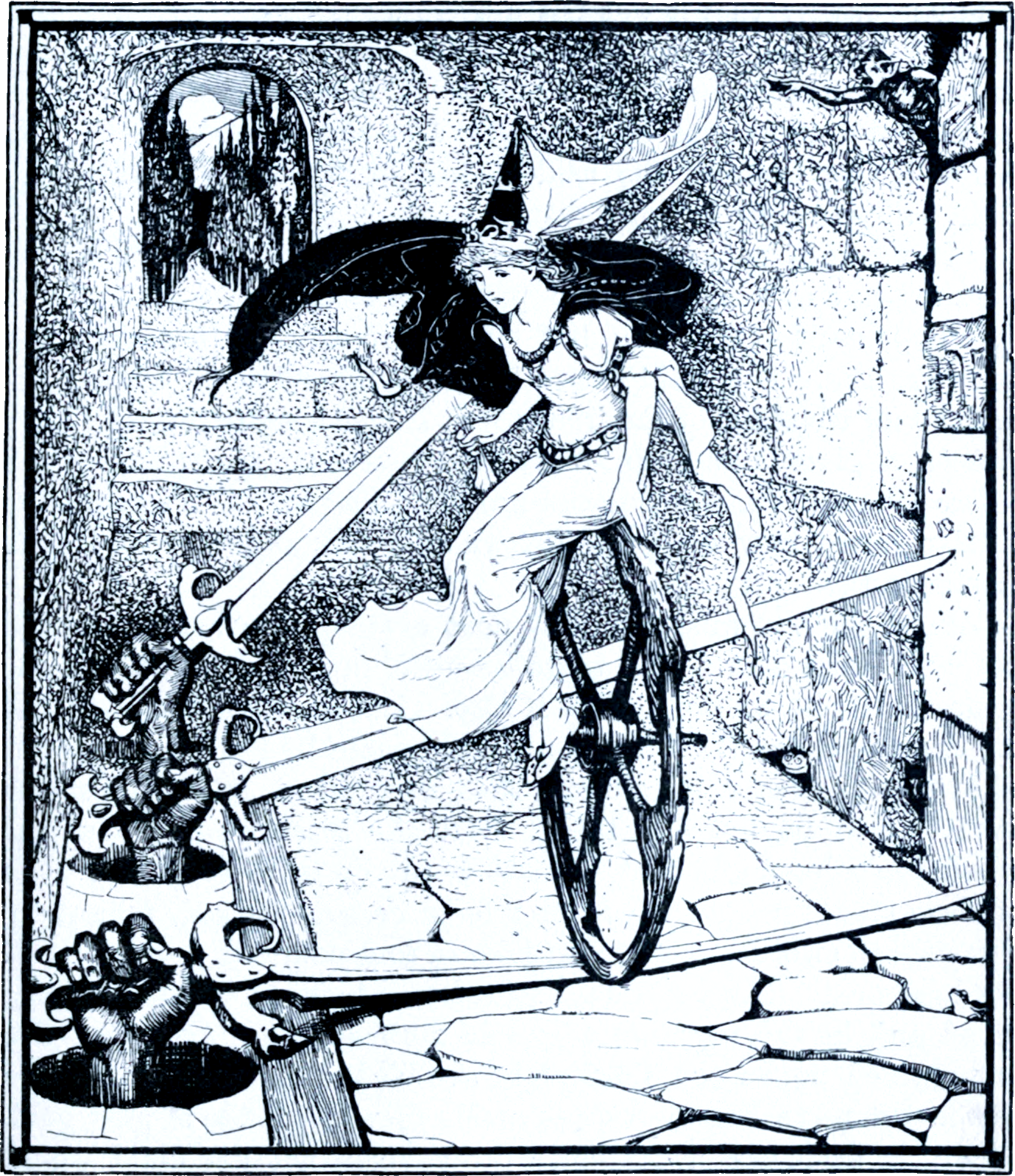
The princess rides the plough-wheel over the sharpened sword. Illustration from The Yellow Fairy Book by H. Justice Ford.

She comes upon a castle where the prince is to be married, as he believes her to have died, and takes a job as a maid. One night she cracks a nut and finds inside it a dress. She finds that each nut holds a dress and each dress is more beautiful than the last. The prince's bride asks to buy the first dress, but instead the princess offers a trade. In exchange for the dress, she will be allowed to spend one night in the prince's room. That night the bride gives the prince a sleeping drink so that he sleeps through the night and the princess cannot reveal to him who she is. She weeps and the servants overhear. The second night the princess makes the same bargain with the bride but again the bride gives the prince a sleeping drink so that he sleeps through the night. As the princess weeps, the servants again hear. On the third night the princess trades the last dress for a chance to spend the night in the prince's room. Again the bride gives the prince a sleeping drink but this time the servants have told the prince of the princess' sorrowful pleas, and he does not drink. When the princess begins to weep, he reveals that he is awake and knows that she isn't dead and is his true love.

They steal the bride's clothing so she could not get up and flee, using the ploughwheel and the needles to get back to the cottage of toads and frogs, but when they arrive, it becomes a castle, and the frogs and toads, which were the children of kings, are all transformed back into their true forms. They marry and live there for many years, are reconciled with the princess's father and unite their kingdoms into one.

== Analysis ==
=== Tale type ===
Scholars Hans-Jörg Uther and Jack Zipes recognized that the tale belonged to the cycle of the "Animal as Bridegroom".

In folktales classified as tale type ATU 425A, "The Search for the Lost Husband" or "The Animal as Bridegroom", the maiden breaks a taboo or burns the husband's animal skin and, to atone, she must wear down a numbered pair of metal shoes. On her way to her husband, she usually asks for the help of the Sun, the Moon and the Wind, whereas inother variants, the heroine's helpers are three old women who live in distant cottages. According to Hans-Jörg Uther, the main feature of tale type ATU 425A is "bribing the false bride for three nights with the husband".

=== Motifs ===
According to Jack Zipes, the Brothers Grimm interpreted the Eisenofern as Eitofan, a place of fire and possibly Hell.

== Variants ==
=== United States ===
American folklorist Marie Campbell collected an American variant from informant "Aunt" Lizbeth Fields. In this tale, titled The Little Old Rusty Cook Stove in the Woods, a king's daughter loses her way in the woods. Suddenly, she hears a voice coming from inside an old cook stove. The voice from inside the cook stove belongs to a prince. The prince asks for her help in getting him out of the stove, and in exchange he will help her, if she marries him. The king's daughter agrees and finds her way back to her father. She explains the situation to the king, but he disagrees with sending her back to the stove. So he orders a miller's daughter, then a fisherman's daughter in her stead. Each maiden returns without releasing the prince. The king's daughter goes herself to the stove and liberates the prince from the stove. She goes back to the castle to say goodbye to her father, but says more than three words and the prince disappears. The king's daughter tries to search for him and finds a hut in the woods, where toad-frogs live. After spending a night there, the toad-frogs give her two needles and a plough-wheel - to use to climb a glass mountain - and three nuts. The king's daughter climbs the glass mountain and hires herself as a cook in a castle. The king's daughter discovers the "stove prince" is living there and is soon to be married to another wife. The king's daughter cracks opens the nuts to produce dresses she uses to bribe the false bride for three nights with the stove prince. In a review of Marie Campbell's book, German scholar Kurt Ranke noted that the American tale corresponded to the German one by the Grimms.

=== Ukraine ===
Folklorist Mykola Zinchuk collected a Ukrainian tale from a source in Bucovina. In this tale, titled "Царевич із ящика" ("Prince in the Box"), a tsar's daughter loses her way in the forest, and finds an iron box in the woods. A voice greets the princess from inside the box, saying it is an enchanted prince and asks her to go home and fetch an axe to destroy the box, then he could marry her, otherwise she will remain lost in the forest. The princess agrees, and tells him she will marry him once he leaves the forest. She returns home and tells the tsar about the iron box, but the monarch sends for other girls in his daughter's stead: first, a miller daughter, after bribing the miller, then a pig-keeper's daughter. Both girls take an axe and go to meet the iron box, but the prince inside the box discovers the ruse and wants the princess to come. The princess herself goes with the axe and breaks open the iron box, releasing a handsome prince. The prince says he will take the princess to his homeland to marry, but the princess insists to say her goodbye to her father in three words. The girl returns home and tells everything to her father in more than three words, then returns to the forest to meet her bridegroom, but cannot find him anywhere. She cries for his disappearance and goes in search of him. She reaches a hut in the forest that belongs to an old woman, who welcomes her, gives three beautiful dresses and a wheel. The old woman explains the princess can ride the wheel to avoid two ramming swords so she can reach the mountain where the prince is. The princess does as instructed and reaches the prince's home atop the mountain, where he is to be married to another bride. The prince cannot recognize the tsar's daughter, and the whole place is preparing for his upcoming wedding, but it lacks enough cooks. Thus, the princess offers herself as a cook for the party. After her work, she takes out the dresses to put them on, which attracts the attention of the prince's second bride. The princess trades the dresses for one night in the prince's chambers: she fails for the first two nights, since the second bride has given him some strong wine to make him fall asleep. A nearby guard tells the prince about a girl that comes in the night to cry over him, saying she was the one to save him from the box. After the second attempt, the same guard asks the prince why his bride is crying over him, but the prince realizes the princess he met in the forest has come to meet him. On the third day, the princess trades the third splendid dress for a final night in the prince's chambers, and the prince spills the strong wine. The princess cries over his sleeping frame, he wakes up, embraces and kisses her. He says goodbye to the second bride and marries the princess.

== In popular culture ==
The Iron Stove is featured in Grimm's Fairy Tale Classics, but it has many changes. The prince's bride does not exist and is instead replaced by a creature known as the imp fairy (who resembles a succubus), and she takes place as the princess' love rival for him. The prince is put in a trance rather than to sleep, and the princess breaks said trance by going through a thorny mountain, crossing a lake without a boat, tricking guards with a nut that contains diamonds, refusing to believe that the prince would choose the fairy over him even when the fairy taunts her about it, and finally by openly telling him that she loves him. When the prince is disenchanted, she jumps off from a huge flight of stairs towards him; her love for him creates protective shields that let her reach him, and then deflect the fairy’s magical powers and cause her to fall through the ground into a bottomless abyss.

== See also ==
- Black Bull of Norroway
- East of the Sun and West of the Moon
- The Brown Bear of Norway
- The Singing, Springing Lark
