= Margaret Read MacDonald =

American writer

- Born: January 21, 1940 (age 86); Seymour, Indiana, U.S.
- Education: Indiana University Bloomington (BA, PhD); University of Washington (MLS); University of Hawaiʻi at Mānoa (MEd)
- Occupations: Storyteller; folklorist; author
- Spouse: James Bruce MacDonald
- Children: 2
- Parent(s): Murray Read; Mildred Amick Read
- Writing career
- Genre: Children's literature

Margaret Read MacDonald (born January 21, 1940) is an American storyteller, folklorist, and award-winning children's book author. She has published more than 65 books, of stories and about storytelling, which have been translated into many languages. She has performed internationally as a storyteller, is considered a "master storyteller", and has been dubbed a "grand dame of storytelling". She focuses on creating "tellable" folktale renditions, which enable readers to share folktales with children easily. MacDonald has been president of the National Storytelling Association and the Children's Folklore Section of the American Folklore Society.

== Early life ==
Margaret Read MacDonald was born in Seymour, Indiana, growing up in a rural Southern Indiana community near the Muscatatuck River. She was the daughter of Murray Read and Mildred Amick Read. Her family was active in the North Vernon Methodist Church, and her mother would recite to the Women's Society of Christian Service and the Eastern Star. Her mother, raised as a farm girl near Scipio, Indiana, read James Whitcomb Riley's poetry at bedtime, instilling rhythms in Margaret's head.

== Education ==
MacDonald attended Indiana University Bloomington, receiving her Bachelor of Arts in Anthropology in 1962. She then attended the University of Washington, receiving her Master of Library Science in 1964, and the University of Hawaiʻi at Mānoa, receiving her Master of Education in Early Childhood Education in 1969. She returned to Indiana University to receive her Ph.D. in folklore in 1979. Her thesis became The Storyteller’s Sourcebook: A Title, Subject, and Motif-Index to Folktale Collections for Children (1982). It was listed as an American Library Association outstanding reference source in 1982.

== Career ==
External videos
- “Look Back & See by Margaret Read MacDonald”
- “Cockroach Party – Duet with Margaret Read MacDonald & Jeff Gere“
- ”Not Our Problem by Margaret Read MacDonald”

MacDonald combined experience from 35 years as a children's librarian (San Francisco Public; Oahu bookmobiles; Singapore American School; Mountain-Valley Library System; Montgomery County Maryland; King County Library System) with her degree in folklore (Ph.D. Indiana University Folklore Institute 1979) to create tellable folktale collections and picture books "so rhythmic and conversational even a first-time storyteller will be successful." Her folktale picture books, such as Fat Cat and Party Croc! are known for their rhythmic quality and easy readability. Kirkus Review notes the patterned text as contributing to MacDonald's trademark style and encouraging audience participation.

"These stories talk about issues that affect all of us. They tell us about how to be kind, how to get along with people, and they’re playful. In most cultures, children are part of the storytelling event. The tales appeal to both children and adults. Often livelier, fun stories are told early in the evening and later, after the children have fallen asleep, the adults can turn to more serious tales."

In 1995-96 MacDonald was a Fulbright Scholar in Mahasarakham, Thailand, working with Wajuppa Tossa. The project encouraged students to learn and continue to use their local dialects, as storytellers, as well as preserve little-known tales by translating them into English. Stories were translated from the local languages into English, refined as tellable stories, and then translated back into the local language and checked for cultural gaffes. MacDonald and Wajuppa developed a co-telling style in which they followed each other line-for-line in two languages.

MacDonald has taught courses in storytelling at the University of Washington and Lesley University. Since her retirement from librarianship in 2002 she has traveled extensively abroad teaching storytelling techniques and performing. She has recruited tellers to put their countries’ tales into print and edited folktale collections by tellers from Argentina, Cuba, Brazil, Indonesia, Laos, Malaysia, Singapore, Thailand, and Saudi Arabia.

As a folklorist, MacDonald has interviewed traditional tellers to produce Scipio Storytelling: Talk in a Southern Indiana Community (1996) and Ten Traditional Tellers (2006), which features ten storytellers from around the world.

MacDonald has been a member of the American Library Association, Association for Library Service to Children, Children's Literature Association, International Board on Books for Young People, Society of Children's Book Writers and Illustrators, and Washington Library Association. Macdonald has been a member (1986–90) and president (1989–90) of the board of directors of the Washington State Folklife Council and a member (1988–91) and president (1989–90) of the board of directors of Youth Theater Northwest. She has been a member of the board (1992–95, 2023–) and president (1998) of the National Storytelling Association, and president of the Children's Folklore Section of the American Folklore Society (1993–94).

MacDonald was chosen for the Outstanding Author and Storyteller Award, 2001–2002 by the Washington Organization for Reading Development, an affiliate of the International Literacy Association (ILA). She is one of the most-awarded recipients of the National Storytelling Association's ORACLE Awards, winning four between 1998 and 2024.

== Family ==
Margaret Read and her husband James Bruce MacDonald have two daughters, Julie Liana MacDonald Martin and Jennifer Skye MacDonald Whitman. Jen and her husband Nat Whitman also tell stories, such as The Whitman Story Sampler. Margaret Read MacDonald currently lives in Des Moines, Washington and spends time in the summer on Guemes Island, Washington where she holds a storyteller's retreat.

== Works ==
=== Picture books ===
- The Old Woman Who Lived in a Vinegar Bottle (illus. Nancy Dunaway Fowlkes) (1995)
- Tuck-me-in Tales: Bedtime Stories from Around the World (illustrated by Yvonne LeBrun Davis) (1996)
- Slop! A Welsh Folktale (illustrated by Yvonne LeBrun Davis) (1997)
- The Girl Who Wore Too Much (illustrated by Yvonne LeBrun Davis) (1998)
- Pickin’ Peas (illustrated by Pat Cummings) (1998)
- The Fat Cat: A Danish Folktale (illustrated by Julie Paschkis) (2001)
- Mabela the Clever (illustrated by Tim Coffey) (2001)
- A Hen, a Chick, and a String Guitar (illustrated by Sophie Fatus) (2001)
- Conejito: A Folktale from Panama (illustrated by Geraldo Valério) (2006)
- Tunjur! Tunjur! Tunjur! A Folktale from Palestine (illustrated by Alik Arzoumanian) (2006)
- Teeny Weeny Bop (illustrated by Diane Greenseid) (2006)
- The Squeaky Door (illustrated by Mary Newell DePalma) (2006)
- Old Woman and Her Pig (illustrated by John Kanzler) (2007)
- Little Rooster’s Diamond Button (illustrated by Will Terry) (2007)
- Go to Sleep Gecko: A Folktale from Bali (illustrated by Geraldo Valério) (2007)
- The Great, Smelly, Slobbery, Small-Tooth Dog (illustrated by Julie Paschkis) (2007)
- Bat’s Big Game (illustrated by Eugenia Nobati) (2008)
- Surf War (illustrated by Geraldo Valério) (2009)
- How Many Donkeys: An Arabic Counting Tale (with Nadia Jameel Taibah) (illustrated by Carol Liddiment) (2009)
- Too Many Fairies (illustrated by Susan Mitchell) (2009)
- Boy from the Dragon Palace (illustrated by Sachiko Yoshikawa) (2011)
- Give Up, Gecko: A Folktale from Uganda (illustrated by Deborah Melmon) (2013)
- Party Croc! A Folktale from Zimbabwe (illustrated by Derek Sullivan) ( 2015).

=== Folklore collections ===
- When the Lights Go Out: 20 Scary Tales to Tell (1988)
- The Skit Book; 101 Skits from Kids (1990)
- Look Back and See: Twenty Lively Tales for Gentle Tellers (1991)
- Peace Tales: World Folktales to Talk About (1992)
- Tom Thumb (1993)
- Celebrate the World: Twenty Multicultural Folktales (1994)
- Ghost Stories from the Pacific Northwest (1995)
- Earth Care: World Folktales to Talk About (1999)
- The Round Book: Rounds Kids Love to Sing (with Winifred Jaeger, illus. by Yvonne LeBrun Davis) (1999)
- Shake-it-up Tales: Stories to Sing, Dance, Drum and Act Out (2000)
- Three Minute Tales (2005)
- Five Minute Tales (2007)
- The Singing Top: Tales from Malaysia, Singapore, and Brunei (2009)

=== Edited folklore collections ===
- Thai Tales by Supaporn Vathanaprida. Editor Margaret Read MacDonald (1994)
- Indonesian Folktales by Murti Bunanta. Editor Margaret Read MacDonald (2003)
- From the Winds of Manguito by Elvia Pérez. Translator Paula Martín. Editor Margaret Read MacDonald (2004).
- Brazilian Folktales by Livia de Almeida. Editor Margaret Read MacDonald (2005).
- Lao Folktales by Wajuppa Tossa and Kongdeaune Nettavong. Editor Margaret Read MacDonald (2009)
- The Singing Top: Tales from Malaysia, Singapore, and Brunei (2009)
- Pachamama Tales: Folklore from Argentina, Bolivia, Chile, Paraguay, Peru, and Uruguay. Retold and translated by Paula Martín. Edited by Margaret Read MacDonald, (2014)
- Storyteller’s Sampler: Tales from Tellers Around the World. Edited by Margaret Read MacDonald. (2015)
- Folktales from the Arabian Peninsula: Tales of Bahrain, Kuwait, Oman, Qatar, Saudi Arabia, The United Arab Emirates, and Oman by Nadia Jameel Taibah and Margaret Read MacDonald. (2015)

=== Storytelling handbooks ===
- Twenty Tellable Tales: Audience Participation Folktales for the Beginning Storyteller (1986, 2005)
- Booksharing: 101 Programs to Use with Preschoolers (1988)
- The Storyteller’s Start-up Book (1993)
- Bookplay: 101 Creative Themes to Share with Young Children (1995)
- A Parent’s Guide to Storytelling: How to Make Up New Stories and Retell Old Favorites (1995, 2001)
- Tell the World: Telling Across Language Barriers (2007)
- Teaching with Story: Classroom Connections to Storytelling (co-authored with Jennifer MacDonald Whitman and Nathaniel Forrest Whitman) (2013)

=== Reference books ===
- The Storyteller’s Sourcebook: A Subject, Title, and Motif-Index to Folklore Collections for Children (1982)
- The Folklore of World Holidays (1991)
- Traditional Storytelling Today: An International Sourcebook (1999)
- The Storyteller’s Sourcebook : A Subject, Title, and Motif-Index to Folklore Collections for Children, 1983-1999 (supplement, co-authored with Brian Sturm) (2001)

=== Folklore studies ===
- Scipio Storytelling: Talk in a Southern Indiana Community (1996)
- Ten Traditional Tellers (2006)

=== Community history ===
- Scipio, Indiana: Threads from the Past (1988)

=== CD/DVD ===
- Tuck-me-in Tales: Bedtime Stories from Around the World (with Richard Scholtz) CD (1997)
- Cockroach Party! (with Richard Scholtz) CD (1999, 2005)
- Fat Cat and Friends. (with Richard Scholtz) CD (2002)
- Mabela the Clever. DVD (2006)
- Little Rooster's Diamond Button. DVD. (2008)

== Selected book awards and honors ==
- The Storyteller's Sourcebook ALA RTSD Best Reference 1982
- Peace Tales: World Folktales to Talk About (August House,1992) Best books for young adults, 1992; Children's Trade Book in the Field of Social Studies; Storytelling World, 1995
- Pickin’ Peas. Parenting Magazine Reading Magic Award, 1998; Tennessee Volunteer Award, 2000
- The Fat Cat Parent's Choice Silver Award 2001
- Mabela the Clever Parent's Choice Gold Award, 2001; Aesop Accolade
- The Storyteller's Sourcebook, 1983-1999, Anne Izard Award, 2002; Storytelling World Award
- Tunjur! Tunjur! Tunjur! ALA Notable 2006
- Mabela the Clever. DVD. ALSC Notable Children's Film, 2006
- Great, Smelly, Slobbery, Small-Tooth Dog. Storytelling World Award, 2007; NAPPA Gold 2007; Foreword Book of the Year Honor, 2007
- Go to Sleep Gecko. Anne Izard Award, 2007; Flicker Tale Book Award, 2008; KIND Children's Honor, 2007; Finalist Foreword Magazine Book of the Year, 2006; Cooperative Children's Book Center Choices, 2007
- How Many Donkeys. Sharjah World Award, 2009
- Boy from the Dragon Palace. Anne Izard Award, 2013; Bank Street Best Children's Books, 2012; Storytelling World Award 2012
- Teaching with Story: Classroom Connection to Storytelling. Co-authors Jennifer Whitman and Nathaniel Forrest Whitman. Anne Izard Award, 2015, Storytelling World Award, 2014
