= Manfred Heine =

German volleyball player (born 1940)

Personal information
- Nationality: German
- Born: 3 April 1940 (age 84); Forst, Germany

Sport
- Sport: Volleyball

Manfred Heine (born 3 April 1940) is a German volleyball player. He competed in the men's tournament at the 1968 Summer Olympics.
