= Bearskin Lake (Minnesota) =

Lake in the state of Minnesota, United States

- West Bearskin Lake, Birch Lake, Muko-waiani
- Location within Minnesota
- Interactive map of Bearskin Lake
- Location: Cook County, Minnesota
- Group: Boundary Waters Canoe Area
- Coordinates: 48.066°N 90.426765°W
- Type: oligotrophic, glacial
- Basin countries: United States
- Surface area: 493 acres (200 ha)
- Average depth: 31 ft (9.4 m)
- Max. depth: 78 ft (24 m)
- Residence time: 17 years

Bearskin Lake is an oligotrophic glacial lake near the Boundary Waters Canoe Area (BWCA) in Minnesota, United States. The name Bearskin Lake is an English translation of the Ojibwe-language name Muko-waiani. Bearskin Lake is a source of control sediment for US federal sediment toxicity studies. Bearskin Lake is home to Camp Menogyn, a YMCA camp only accessible by boat.

== Sediments and scientific significance ==
Due to the cleanliness of the lake and the physical attributes of its sediment, Bearskin Lake sediment is ideal for sediment toxicity testing. Bearskin Lake sediment is used as a control sediment in the federal government's toxicity tests and was used to develop the US EPA's toxicity testing methods.

== See also ==
- List of lakes in Minnesota
