= The Lazy Spinner =

German fairy tale

Folk tale
- Name: The Lazy Spinner
- Also known as: The Lazy Spinning Woman
- Aarne–Thompson grouping: ATU 1405
- Country: Germany
- Published in: Grimms' Fairy Tales

"The Lazy Spinner" or "The Lazy Spinning Woman" is a German fairy tale collected by the Brothers Grimm, tale number 128. It is Aarne-Thompson type 1405.

== Synopsis ==
A lazy woman does not like to spin and when she does so, fails to wind her thread onto a reel, but leaves it on the bobbin. Her husband complains, and she says she needs a reel to do that, but when he goes to cut one, she sneaks after him and calls out that whoever cuts a reel will die. This puts him off cutting it, but he still complains. She then makes some yarn and says it must be boiled. Then she puts some tow in the pot instead and sets her husband to watch. After some time, he opens the pot, sees the tow, and thinks he has ruined the yarn. From then on, the husband does not dare complain.
