= The Three Army Surgeons =

German fairy tale

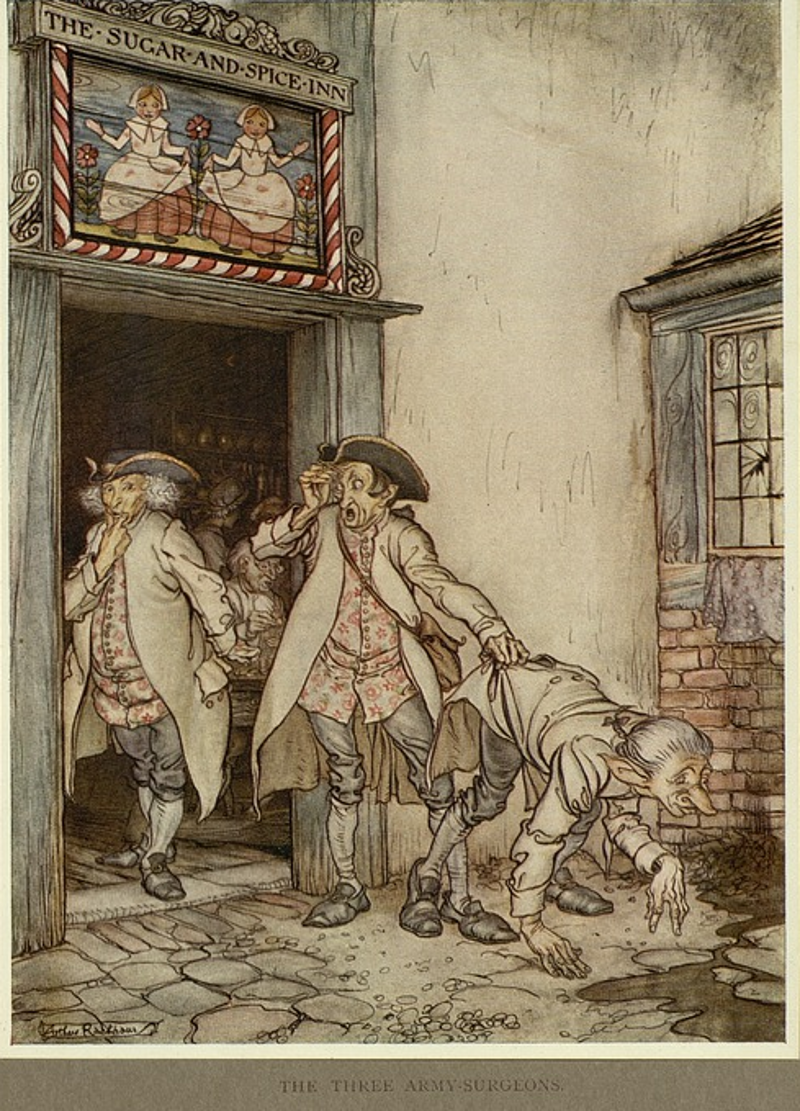
- Arthur Rackham, 1917

Folk tale
- Name: The Three Army Surgeons
- Aarne–Thompson grouping: ATU 660
- Country: Germany
- Published in: Grimms' Fairy Tales

"The Three Army Surgeons" (KHM 118, Die drei Feldscherer) is a Brothers Grimm fairy tale.

== Synopsis ==
Three traveling army surgeons perform surgery on themselves to impress an innkeeper. After removing their own organs, they will put them back in the morning. One cuts off his hand, one cuts out his heart and one removes his own eyes. During the night a girl working at the inn has a visit from her lover, a soldier. She gives him some food from the cupboard that is holding the organs. The cat comes and takes the organs. After seeing the organs gone, she tells the soldier. He goes to the gallows and cuts the correct hand off a thief and brings it to her. He then gets the heart of a pig and eyes of a cat. In the morning the doctors re-attach the missing members using a salve they carry with them. After going on the road again one doctor could not see with his reinstalled eyes and had the others guide him. Another doctor started rooting around in the dirt. When they reached another inn the third doctor found he could not help stealing. After traveling back to the original inn they found the girl had fled seeing their approach. They threatened to burn down the inn unless the innkeeper make reparations. He paid them enough to retire, though they still wanted their original organs back.

== In modern fiction ==
Doctor Swineheart in the Fables comic book is one of the three surgeons. He boasts about being the best field surgeon in the world. Swineheart also plays a role in the related video game, The Wolf Among Us (2013).
