= Bearskin (German fairy tale) =

German fairy tale

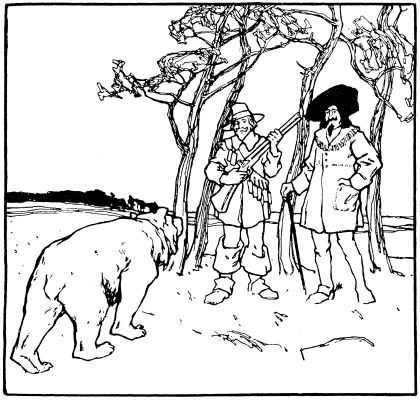
- 1909 illustration by Otto Ubbelohde depicting the bear, the soldier and the Devil.

Folk tale
- Name: Bearskin
- Aarne–Thompson grouping: ATU 361
- Country: Germany
- Published in: Grimm's Fairy Tales

"Bearskin" (German: Der Bärenhäuter) is a fairy tale collected by the Brothers Grimm (KHM 101). A variant from Sicily, "Don Giovanni de la Fortuna", was collected by Laura Gonzenbach in Sicilianische Märchen and included by Andrew Lang in The Pink Fairy Book. Italo Calvino included another Italian version, "The Devil's Breeches" from Bologna, in his Italian Folktales.

The tale is classified as Aarne–Thompson type 361 (Bearskin), in which a man gains a fortune and a beautiful bride by entering into a pact with the devil.

== Origin ==
The modern version of tale was originally published by the Brothers Grimm in the first edition of Kinder- und Hausmärchen vol. 2 (1815) no. 15, under the title "Der Teufel Grünrock" (English: 'Devil Greenjacket'), and substantially revised in the 5th edition of the book. Their story is based on the version collected by the von Haxthausen family, and on the tale "Vom Ursprung des Namens Bärnhäuter", first published in 1670 by Hans Jakob Christoffel von Grimmelshausen.

== Synopsis ==
A man serves as a soldier, but when the war ends, he returns home to learn that both of his parents have died and that his brothers have no place for him.

While walking in a heath, the soldier meets a man with a green coat and horses hooves before shooting a bear that is charging at them. The Devil then offers to make the soldier rich if for seven years, he will neither cut his hair, clip his nails, bathe, nor cite the Lord's Prayer, and wear a coat and cloak. If the soldier survives, he will be rich and free, but if he dies, the Devil will claim his soul. The desperate soldier agrees, and the Devil makes him wear both the green coat - telling him that he will find its pockets always full of money - and the dead bear's skin, telling him that he must sleep in it and will be known as Bearskin because of it.

Bearskin sets out, donating money to the poor and asking them to pray for him to live out the seven years. After three years, Bearskin becomes so revolting that he must pay heavily to get any shelter. In the fourth year, he hears an old man lamenting and persuades him to tell his tale: the old man has lost all his money and does not know how to provide for his three daughters nor pay the innkeeper, so he will be jailed. Bearskin pays the innkeeper and gives the old man a purse of gold as well.

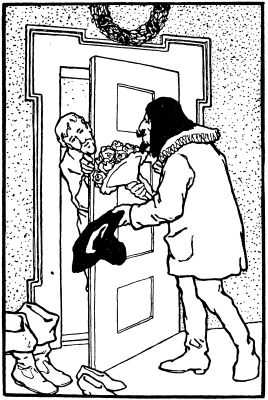
1909 illustration by Otto Ubbelohde which depicts the Devil thanking Bearskin for his help

The old man thanks Bearskin by allowing him to marry any of his three daughters. The oldest daughter runs away in fear. The middle one says that Bearskin is worse than an actual bear passing off as human. The youngest daughter agrees to fulfill her father's promise. Bearskin gives his fiancée one half of a ring and promises to return in three years. The maiden then dresses in black, waiting for her betrothed as her sisters mock her endlessly.

At the end of the seven years, Bearskin finds the Devil again and demands that he fulfill his promise. The Devil then proceeds to bathe Bearskin, clip his nails, cut his hair, and say the Lord's Prayer. The Devil warns Bearskin not to push his luck, as he has already won their bargain, and disappears. Clean and rich, Bearskin dresses himself as a fine gentleman and goes to the old man's house, where the older sisters serve him, but his bride does not recognize him. Bearskin tells the old man that he will marry one of his daughters. The two older sisters run off to dress splendidly, and Bearskin drops his half of the ring into a wine cup and gives it to his bride. She drinks the wine and upon finding the half ring, realizes that he is her bridegroom and they marry.

When they realize that Bearskin is the suitor they had rejected, one sister hangs herself in a rage and the other drowns herself. That night, the Devil knocks on the door to tell Bearskin that he has gotten two souls for the price of one.

== Variants ==
The story is similar to other AT-361 tales like the Swiss "The Devil as Partner", the Austrian "Hell's Gatekeeper", the Russian "Never-Wash", the Sicilian "Don Giovanni de la Fortuna", or the Philippine "The Reward of Kindness".

In "Don Giovanni de la Fortuna", Don Giovanni is not a soldier; he squandered the fortune his father left him and met the Devil while begging. The time limit is three years, three months, and three days, and in that time, he buys a house and his fame spreads; the king asks him to lend him money, and that is how the promise to marry is brought about. The sisters, though they die, are not explicitly taken by the devil.

The "Devil's Breeches" is close to "Don Giovanni de la Fortuna", but while the hero also squanders his money, he attempts to support himself by working as a servant, an attempt that fails because all his masters' wives or sisters fall in love with him, and he has to leave every job. Calvino notes that in his sources, the sisters were merely envious, and added their explicit wish that they would gladly be taken by the Devil because of their rage.

"Hell's Gatekeeper" is another version of Bearskin that is more brief than the other versions. In Hell's Gatekeeper, the main character is not a soldier, but a child who has been dirty for the entirety of his life. This causes the boy to be sent to hell and serve as the gatekeeper of hell for seven years after which he is released. The boy vows to stay clean forever after the experience to avoid being sent to hell eternal.

Yet another version of Bearskin is "The Reward of Kindness", a story about a couple who can not have a child, so the wife promises her child to serve the devil if she could only have one. The wife then has a child and a devil takes him away and tries to tempt him into his service. The child refuses to work for the devil and eventually, the devil gives up and allows the child to leave his service for good if he takes a large bag of money and only does good with it in seven years. The child does good in the seven years and returns to the devil and is then freed from the devil's service and lives a happy life.

== Analysis ==
The tale has much in common with Beauty and the Beast and other tales of monstrous bridegrooms (or brides), but unlike most the main character is the transformed bridegroom. Some other tales, such as Hans My Hedgehog have such a main character, but differ in that, in Bearskin, the wedding is not the trigger for his being restored to human form.

The hero of the German version is a soldier. The tale was collected at a time at which many German kings were conscripting many more men into their armies, and the people of the country and town, who were forced to pay taxes to support such new armies and to house them. Soldiers often left, whether by any discharge they could get, or by deserting, and such an ex-soldier often had to make his way in the world like the hero of Bearskin.

== In popular culture ==
- Tom Davenport produced an Americanized version of the story for the From the Brothers Grimm series. The story is set in rural Virginia after the Civil War with the protagonist being a desperate ex-Confederate soldier. The only changes made to the story are the crying man is a farmer who has lost all of his money and will lose his farm, and the Devil tells the audience, not Bearskin, that he gets two souls for the price of one. The tale is often considered the most chilling of the series.
- A Russian story version was written by Boris Shergin, called "Pron'ka the Dirty" (Russian: Пронька Грезной), later adapted into a cartoon called Mister Pron'ka (Mister Пронька). There, the devil is replaced with a bored wealthy American who makes a bet with a Russian named Pron'ka, with the time limit of 15 years. In return for the standard limitations, Pron'ka is given wares to start a large scale business in Russia. The American, in the meantime, is publishing scientific works and articles about the experiment. By the end of the term, the Tsar himself is heavily in debt, and gives one of his daughters to Pron'ka in order to secure another loan. The American, upon returning to his homeland afterwards, is criticized for wasting all the time and money, but the criticism ends once the others learn that the Tsar's other two daughters, horrified at the prospect of having Pron'ka as a brother-in-law, eloped with the American's brothers; a fact of great national pride.
- A version of "Bearskin" appears in the Japanese animated series Grimm's Masterpiece Theater (known as Grimm's Fairy Tale Classics overseas). In this version, the soldier is named Johann and his fiancée is named Christina (Christine in the Japanese version). His fiancé's sisters, here named Gisela and Tetra, are clearly upset when they find out what they lost, but they do not actually kill themselves and the Devil (here a "minor demon") does not get anything. In this version, the sisters' father is Hans Muller. In the English version of the story, Christina is the middle daughter and Tetra is the youngest one, unlike the original and Japanese versions.
- Bearskin is a character in Bill Willingham's Fables series.
- American composer Stephen DeCesare composed a musical based on the fairy tale: Bearskin: (the musical).

== Operas ==
Operas based on the tale were composed by Siegfried Wagner (op. 1, 1899) and by Arnold Mendelssohn (op.11, 1900).

== See also ==
- The Dragon and his Grandmother
- The Small-tooth Dog
- The Daughter of the Skies
