= Otto Ubbelohde =

German painter

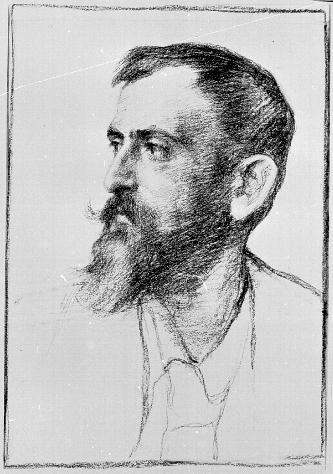
- Likeness of Otto Ubbelohde (ca. 1910) by Richard Winkel (1870-1941)
- Born: Otto Ubbelohde; 5 January 1867; Germany
- Died: 8 April 1922 (aged 55)
- Education: University of Marburg
- Occupations: painter, etcher and illustrator

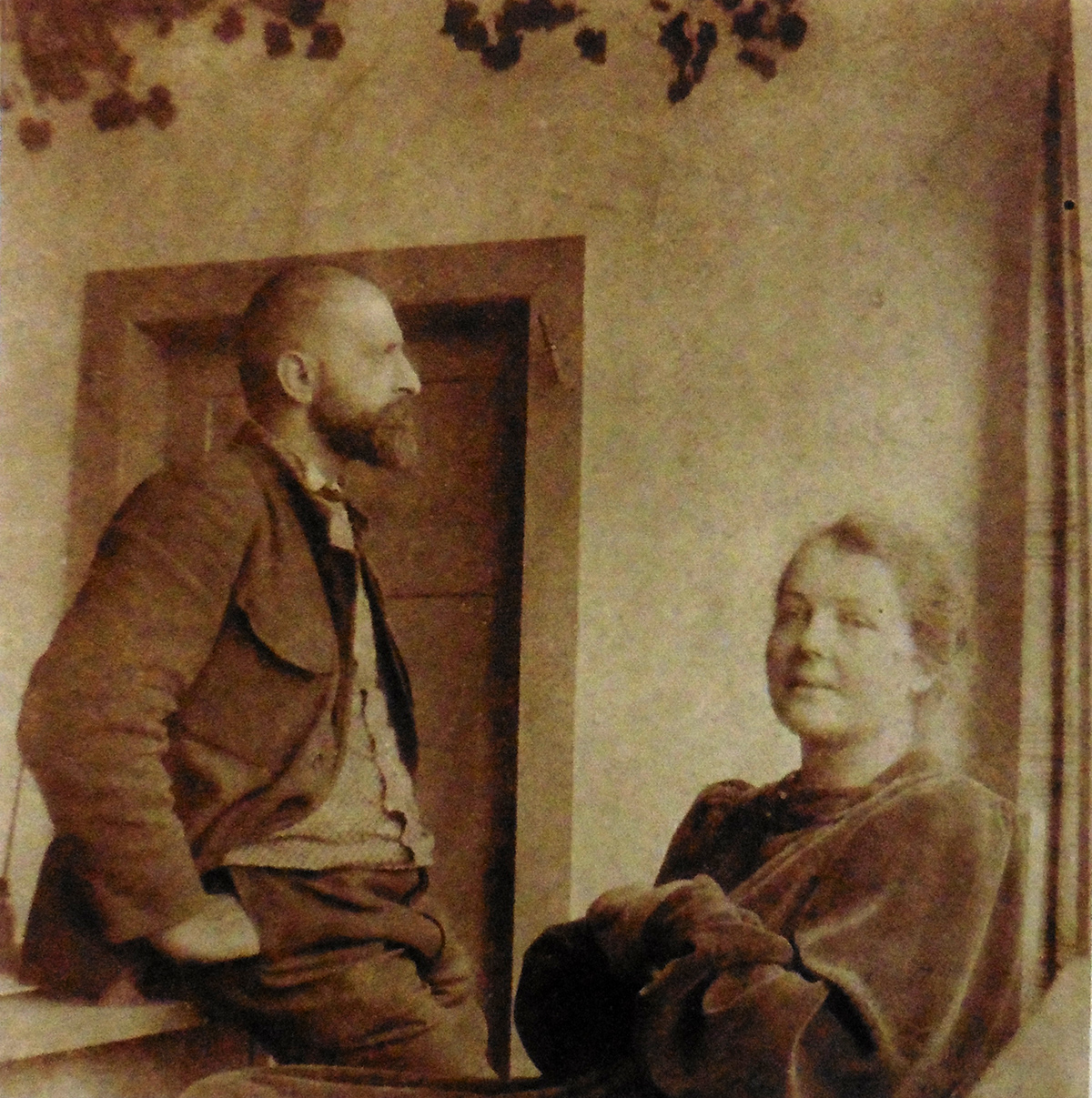
Otto and Hanna Ubbelohde 1906

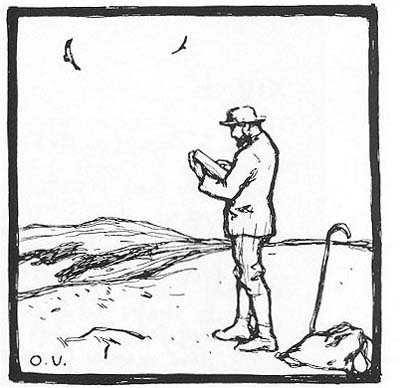
Self-portrait, pen drawing 1914

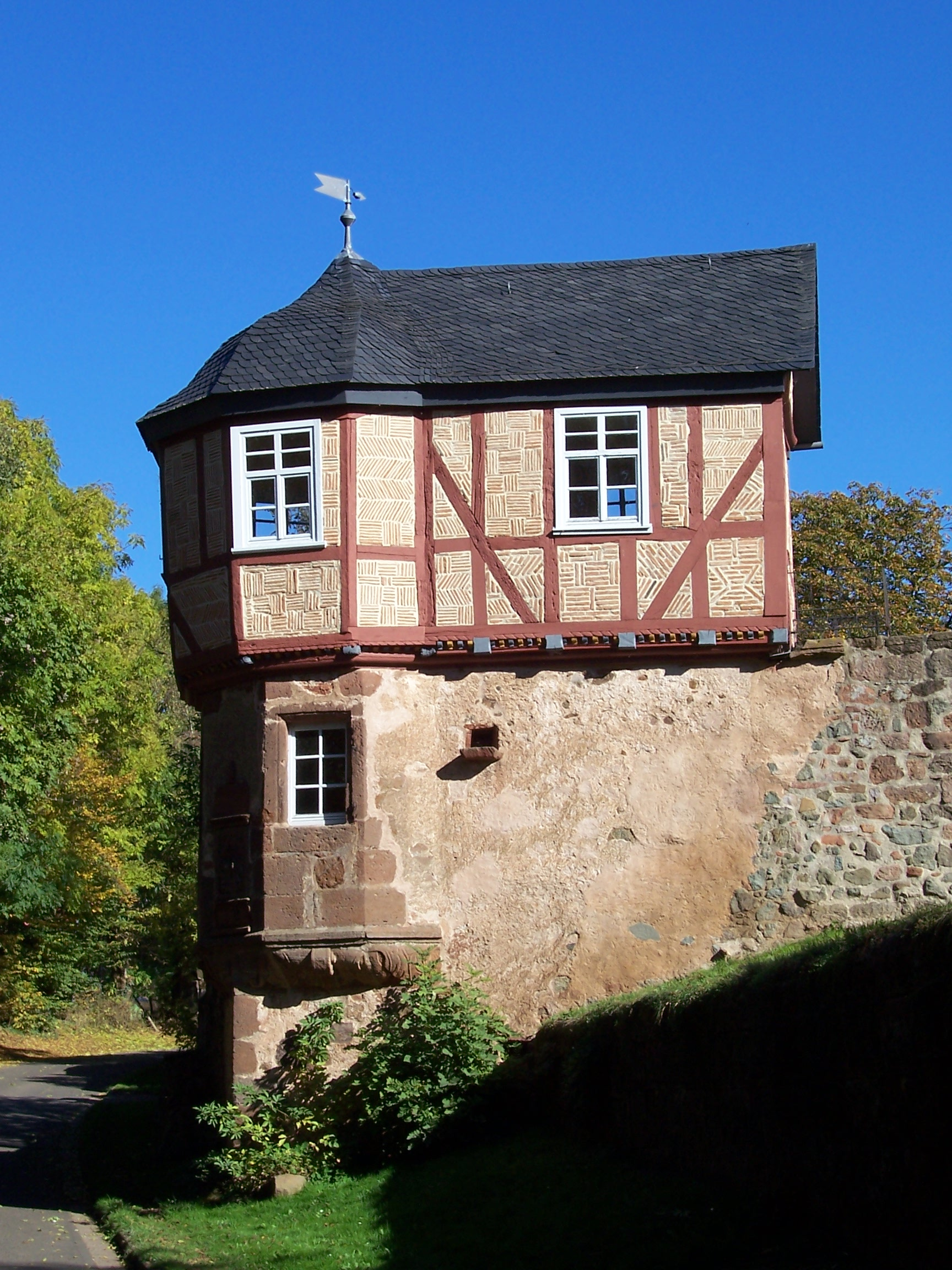
Lustschlößchen in Amönau (Hesse, Germany) – template for Rapunzel tower

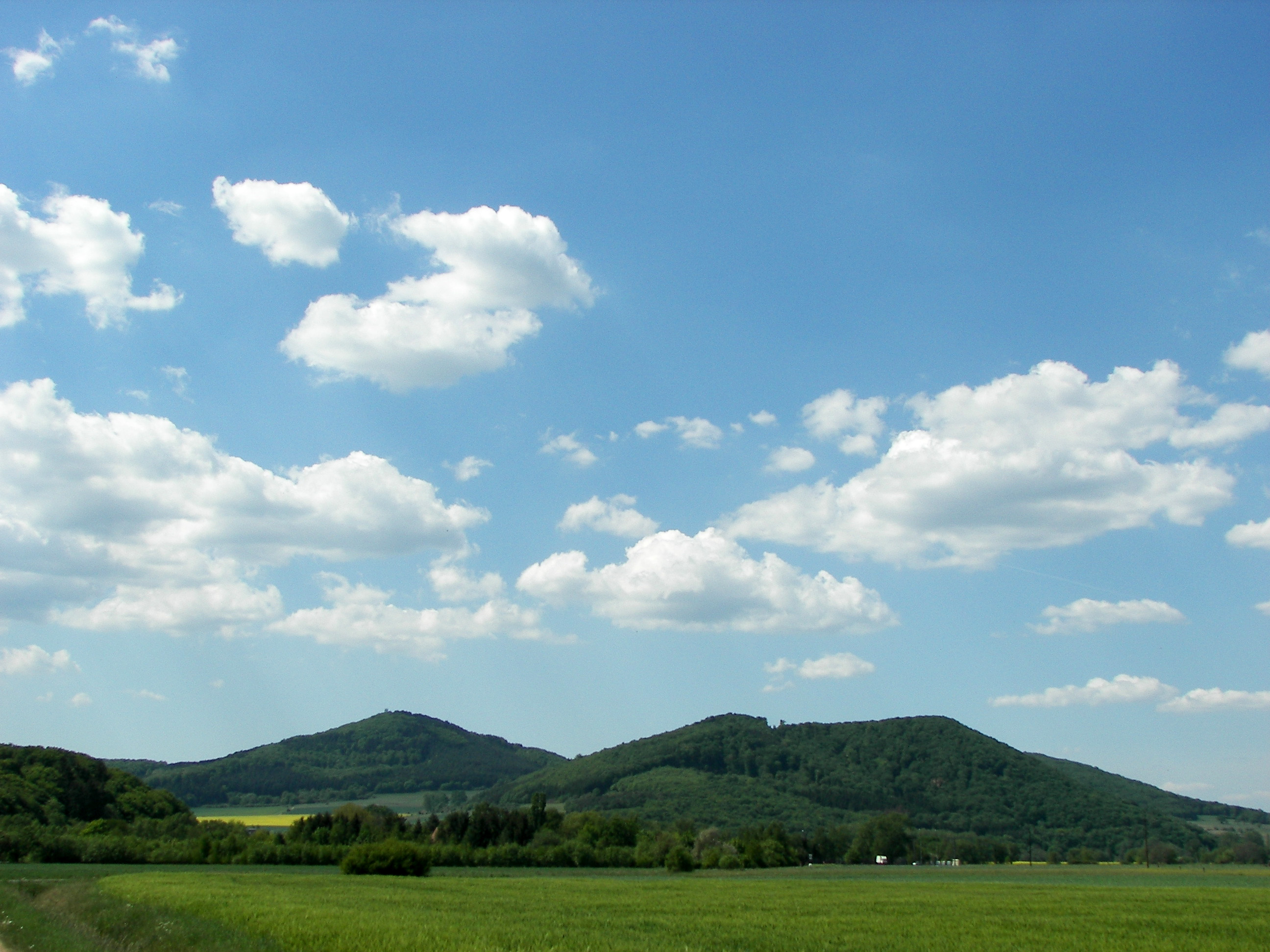
Rimberg (left hill) nearby Goßfelden – template for Mother Hulda

Otto Ubbelohde (5 January 1867 – 8 May 1922) was a German painter, etcher and illustrator.

== Life ==
Ubbelohde was born and grew up in Marburg, where his father August Ubbelohde was a professor at the University of Marburg. From 1900 he lived in Goßfelden, nowadays a part of the community of Lahntal.

== Work ==
Ubbelohde gained international fame for illustrating books of Grimm's Fairy Tales, 1906 and 1908 creating about 450 illustrations of fairy tales. He often took inspiration for his drawings from the landscape and buildings near his atelier and domicile in Goßfelden. For Rapunzel's tower he used as a model a building in Amönau called Lustschlößchen, while in Mother Hulda the landscape is inspired by the Rimberg.

== Gallery ==
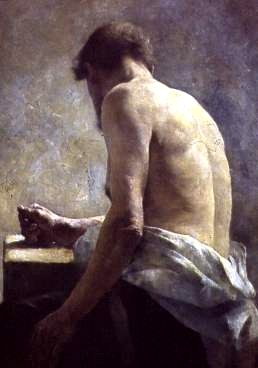
Study, est. 1886

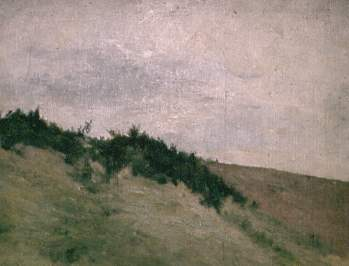
Landscape study, est. 1889

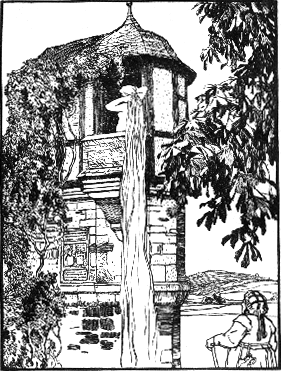
Rapunzel tower

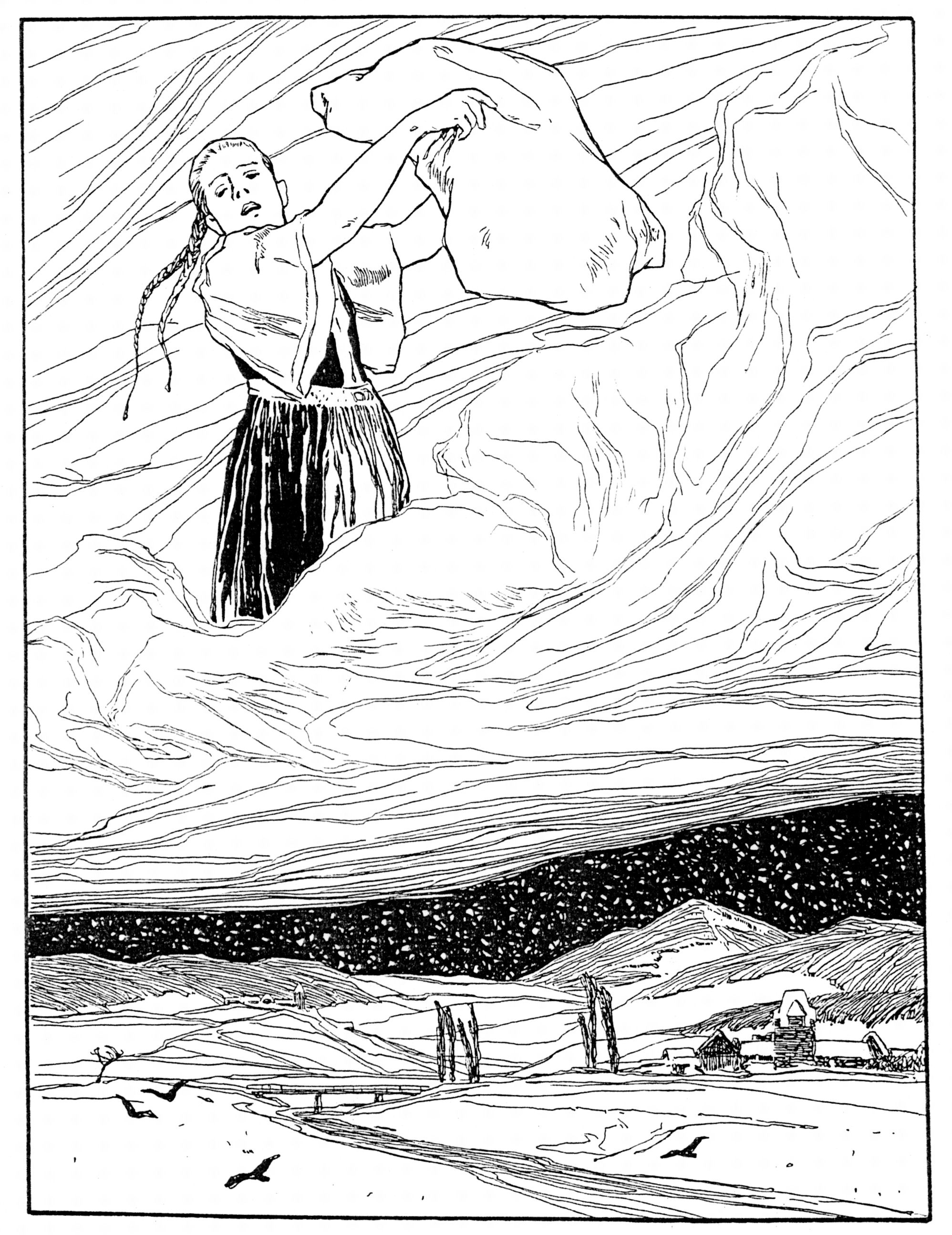
Mother Hulda

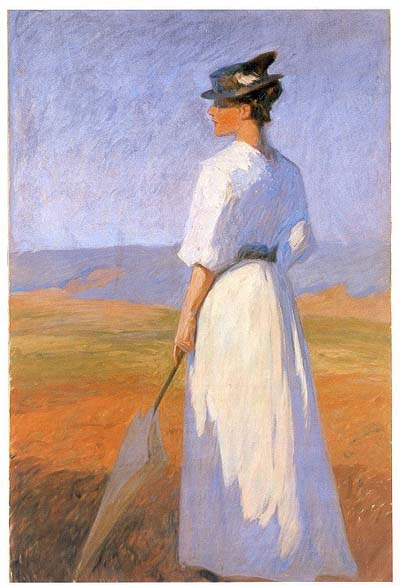
Woman in White (Ubbelohdes wife Hanna)

== Book illustrations ==
- Pussi Mau, und andere Tiergeschichten, Schaffstein, Cologne, circa 1904
- Gebrüder Grimm / Rob Riemann (Editor): Kinder und Hausmärchen gesammelt durch die Brüder Grimm. With 446 illustrations of Otto Ubbelohde. 3 Volumes. Turm-Verlag, Leipzig 1906
- Otto Ubbelohde: Aus Alt-Marburg. 20 Landschaftsbilder von Otto Ubbelohde. N. G. Elwert'sche Verlagsbuchhandlung, Marburg 1906
- Otto Ubbelohde: Rings um Marburg. 20 Landschaftsbilder von Otto Ubbelohde. N. G. Elwert'sche Verlagsbuchhandlung, Marburg 1907
- Karl Ernst Knodt / Otto Ubbelohde (Illustrations): Meine Wälder. Worte von Karl Ernst Knodt. Bilder von Otto Ubbelohde. Verlag Hermann A. Wiechmann, München 1910
- Ernst Piltz / Otto Ubbelohde (Illustrations): Führer durch Jena. Fromann'sche Hofbuchhandlung Eckard Klostermann, Jena 1912
- Gebrüder Grimm / Rob Riemann (Editors): Die Grimmschen Märchen in einer Auswahl. Turm-Verlag, Leipzig 1912
- Otto Ubbelohde: Aus schöner alter Zeit. Federzeichnungen von Otto Ubbelohde. N. G. Elwert'sche Verlagsbuchhandlung, Marburg 1913
- Martin Lang / Otto Ubbelohde (Illustrations): Alt-Tübingen. 30 Federzeichnungen von Otto Ubbelohde. Wilhelm Kloeres, Tübingen 1913
- Otto Ubbelohde: Städte und Burgen an der Lahn. 20 Zeichnungen von Otto Ubbelohde. N. G. Elwert'sche Verlagsbuchhandlung, Marburg 1914
- F. Bruns / H. Mahn / Otto Ubbelohde (Illustrations) / Verein zur Hebung des Fremdenverkehrs in Lübeck (Editor): Lübeck. Ein Führer durch die Freie u. Hansestadt und ihre nähere Umgebung. Rathgens, Lübeck 1918
- B. Flemes / Otto Ubbelohde (Illustrations): Führer durch Hameln. Schatzenberg, Hameln o. J. (est. 1920)
- Ernst Koch / Otto Ubbelohde (Illustrations): Prinz Rosa-Stramin. N. G. Elwert'sche Verlagsbuchhandlung, Marburg 1922
- Ludwig Harig: Da fielen auf einmal die Sterne vom Himmel. Begegnungen mit Dornröschen und dem Eisenhans – eine Märchenreise im Jugendstil. With drawings of Otto Ubbelohde. zu Klampen Verlag, Lüneburg 2002, ISBN 3-933156-74-2
