= Shroud (disambiguation) =

A shroud is a burial cloth, such as the Shroud of Turin.

Shroud or The Shroud may also refer to:

== Arts and entertainment ==
- Shroud (character), a fictional superhero in the Marvel Comics universe
- Shroud (Banville novel), a 2002 novel by John Banville
- Shroud (Tchaikovsky novel), a 2025 novel by Adrian Tchaikovsky
- Shroud (gamer) (born 1994)
- Shroud, fictional villain Fumine Sonozaki in the Japanese TV series Kamen Rider W
- Shroud, a term in Magic: The Gathering
- The Shroud (fairy tale), a story from Grimms' Fairy Tales
- "The Shroud", an episode of the television series Stargate SG-1 (season 10)
- "The Shroud" (The Outer Limits) an episode of the television series The Outer Limits
- The Shroud, a mysterious foe from the computer game Pariah

== Science and technology ==
- Barrel shroud, a firearm component surrounding the barrel
- Muzzle shroud, a firearm component surrounding the muzzle
- Shroud (computing), to obfuscate code, i.e., make it difficult for humans to understand
- Shroud (sailing), a rope that gives support to the masts in sailing ships

== See also ==
- Gas mantle
