= Grimms' Fairy Tales =

Collection of German fairy tales

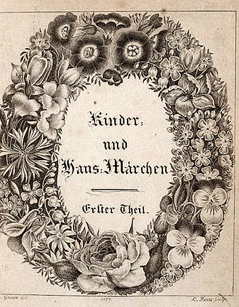
- Title page of first volume of Grimms' Kinder- und Hausmärchen (1819) 2nd ed.
- Author: Jacob and Wilhelm Grimm
- Original title: Kinder- und Hausmärchen (lit. Children's and Household Tales)
- Language: German
- Genre: Fairy tale; Folklore
- Published: 1812–1858
- Publication place: Germany
- Text: Grimms' Fairy Tales at Wikisource

Grimms' Fairy Tales (German: Grimms Märchen), originally known as the Children's and Household Tales (German: Kinder- und Hausmärchen, pronounced [ˌkɪndɐ ʔʊnt ˈhaʊsmɛːɐ̯çən], commonly abbreviated as KHM), is a German collection of fairy tales by the Brothers Grimm, Jacob and Wilhelm, first published on 20 December 1812. Vol. 1 of the first edition contained 86 stories, which were followed by 70 more tales, numbered consecutively, in the 1st edition, Vol. 2, in 1815. By the seventh edition in 1857, the corpus of tales had expanded to 200 tales and 10 "Children's Legends". It is considered the seminal work of Western children's literature and is listed by UNESCO in its Memory of the World Register.

== Origin ==
Jacob Grimm began attending the University of Marburg in 1802, and Wilhelm joined him a year later, both studying law. Jacob drew the attention of Professor Friedrich Carl von Savigny, founder of its historical school of law. He became a prominent personal and professional influence on the brothers. Throughout their time at university, the brothers became quite close with Savigny and were able to use his personal library as they became interested in German law, history, and folklore. Savigny asked Jacob to join him in Paris as an assistant, and Jacob went with him for a year. While he was gone, Wilhelm became very interested in German literature and started collecting books. Once Jacob returned to Kassel in 1806, he adopted his brother's passion and changed his focus from law to German literature. While Jacob studied literature and took care of their siblings, Wilhelm continued to complete his degree in law at Marburg. During the Napoleonic Wars, Jacob interrupted his studies to serve the Hessian War Commission.

Achim von Arnim and Clemens Brentano were good friends of the brothers and wanted to publish folk tales, so they asked the brothers to collect oral tales for publication. The Grimms collected many old books and asked friends and acquaintances in Kassel to tell tales and to gather stories from others. Jacob and Wilhelm sought to collect these stories to write a history of old German literature and to preserve history.

== Composition ==
The first volume of the first edition was published in 1812, containing 86 stories; the second volume of 70 stories followed in 1815. For the second edition, two volumes containing the Kinder- und Hausmärchen (KHM) texts were issued in 1819 and the appendix was removed and published separately in the third volume in 1822, totaling 170 tales. The third edition appeared in 1837, the fourth edition in 1840, the fifth edition in 1843, the sixth edition in 1850, and the seventh edition in 1857. Stories were added, and also removed, from one edition to the next, until the seventh held 210 tales. Some later editions were extensively illustrated, first by Philipp Grot Johann and, after his death in 1892, by German illustrator Anton Robert Leinweber.

The first volumes were much criticized because, although they were called "Children's Tales", they were not regarded as suitable for children, both for the scholarly information included and the subject matter. Many changes through the editions – such as turning the wicked mother of the first edition in Snow White and Hansel and Gretel (shown in original Grimm stories as Hänsel und Grethel) to a stepmother, were probably made with an eye to such suitability. Jack Zipes believes that the Grimms made the change in later editions because they "held motherhood sacred".

They removed sexual references—such as Rapunzel's innocently asking why her dress was getting tight around her belly, and thus naively revealing to the witch Dame Gothel her pregnancy and the prince's visits—but, in many respects, violence, particularly when punishing villains, became more prevalent.

== Popularity ==
The brothers' initial intention of their first book, Children's and Household Tales, was to establish a name for themselves in the world. After publishing the first KHM in 1812, they published a second, augmented and re-edited, volume in 1815. In 1816 Volume I of the German Legends (German: Deutsche Sagen) was published, followed in 1818, Volume II. The book that established their international success was Jacob's German Grammar in 1819. In 1825, the brothers published their Kleine Ausgabe or "small edition", a selection of 50 tales designed for child readers illustrated by Ludwig Emil Grimm. This children's version went through ten editions between 1825 and 1858.

== Influence ==
Kinder- und Hausmärchen (Children and Household Tales) is listed by UNESCO in its Memory of the World Registry.

The Grimms believed that the most natural and pure forms of culture were linguistic and based in history. Their work influenced other collectors, both inspiring them to collect tales and leading them to similarly believe, in a spirit of romantic nationalism, that the fairy tales of a country were particularly representative of it, to the neglect of cross-cultural influence. Among those influenced were the Russian Alexander Afanasyev, the Norwegians Peter Christen Asbjørnsen and Jørgen Moe, the English Joseph Jacobs, and Jeremiah Curtin, an American who collected Irish tales. There was not always a pleased reaction to their collection. Joseph Jacobs was in part inspired by his complaint that English children did not read English fairy tales; in his own words, "What Perrault began, the Grimms completed".

W. H. Auden praised the collection during World War II as one of the founding works of Western culture. The tales themselves have been put to many uses. Adolf Hitler praised them so strongly that the Allies of World War II warned against them, as Hitler thought they were folkish tales showing children with sound racial instincts seeking racially pure marriage partners; for instance, Cinderella with the heroine as racially pure, the stepmother as an alien, and the prince with an unspoiled instinct being able to distinguish. Writers who have written about the Holocaust have combined the tales with their memoirs, as Jane Yolen in her Briar Rose.

Three individual works of Wilhelm Grimm include Altdänische Heldenlieder, Balladen und Märchen ('Old Danish Heroic Songs, Ballads, and Folktales') in 1811, Über deutsche Runen ('On German Runes') in 1821, and Die deutsche Heldensage ('The German Heroic Saga') in 1829.

The Grimm anthology has been a source of inspiration for artists and composers. Arthur Rackham, Walter Crane, and Rie Cramer are among the artists who have created illustrations based on the stories.

== English-language collections ==
"Grimms' Fairy Tales in English" by D.L. Ashliman provides a hyperlinked list of 50 to 100 English-language collections that have been digitized and made available online. They were published in print from the 1820s to 1920s. Listings may identify all translators and illustrators who were credited on the title pages, and certainly identify some others.

=== 1812 edition translations ===
These are some translations of the original collection, also known as the first edition of Volume I.

- Zipes, Jack, ed., tr. (2014) The Original Folk and Fairy Tales of the Brothers Grimm: the complete first edition.
- Loo, Oliver ed., tr. (2014) The Original 1812 Grimm Fairy Tales. A New Translation of the 1812 First Edition Kinder- und Hausmärchen Collected through the Brothers Grimm

=== 1857 edition translations ===
These are some translations of the two-volume seventh edition (1857):

- Hunt, Margaret, ed., tr. (2014) Grimm's Household Tales, with Author's Notes, 2 vols (1884). (Note: A derivative work is Grimm's Fairy Tales, with 212 Illustrations by Josef Scharl (New York: Pantheon Books, 1944) [repr. London: Routledge & Kegan Paul, 1948])
- Manheim, Ralph, tr. (1977) Grimms' Tales for Young and Old: The Complete Stories. New York: Doubleday. (Note: Translated from Kinder- und Hausmärchen gesammelt durch die Brüder Grimm (Munich: Winkler, 1949). Manheim believed this to be a reprint of the second, 1819 edition of Kinder- und Hausmärchen, but it was in fact a reprint of the 7th, 1857 edition)
- Luke, David; McKay, Gilbert; Schofield, Philip tr. (1982) Brothers Grimm: Selected Tales. (Note: See Luke&McKay&Gilbert tr. (1982), p. 41 for details of the edition used.)

=== Brief ban in postwar Germany ===
Following WWII, the fairy tales of the Brothers Grimm were banned in the British Occupation Zone of Germany, as many believed they were the root of German violence.

== List ==
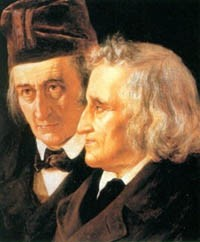
Grimm Brothers

The acronym "KHM" stands for Kinder- und Hausmärchen. The titles are those as of 1857. Some titles in 1812 were different. All editions from 1812 until 1857 split the stories into two volumes.

This section contains 211 listings, as "KHM 1" to "KHM 210" in numerical sequence plus "KHM 151a". The next section "Removed from final edition" contains 30 listings including 18 that are numbered in series "1812 KHM ###" and 12 without any label.

=== Volume 1 ===
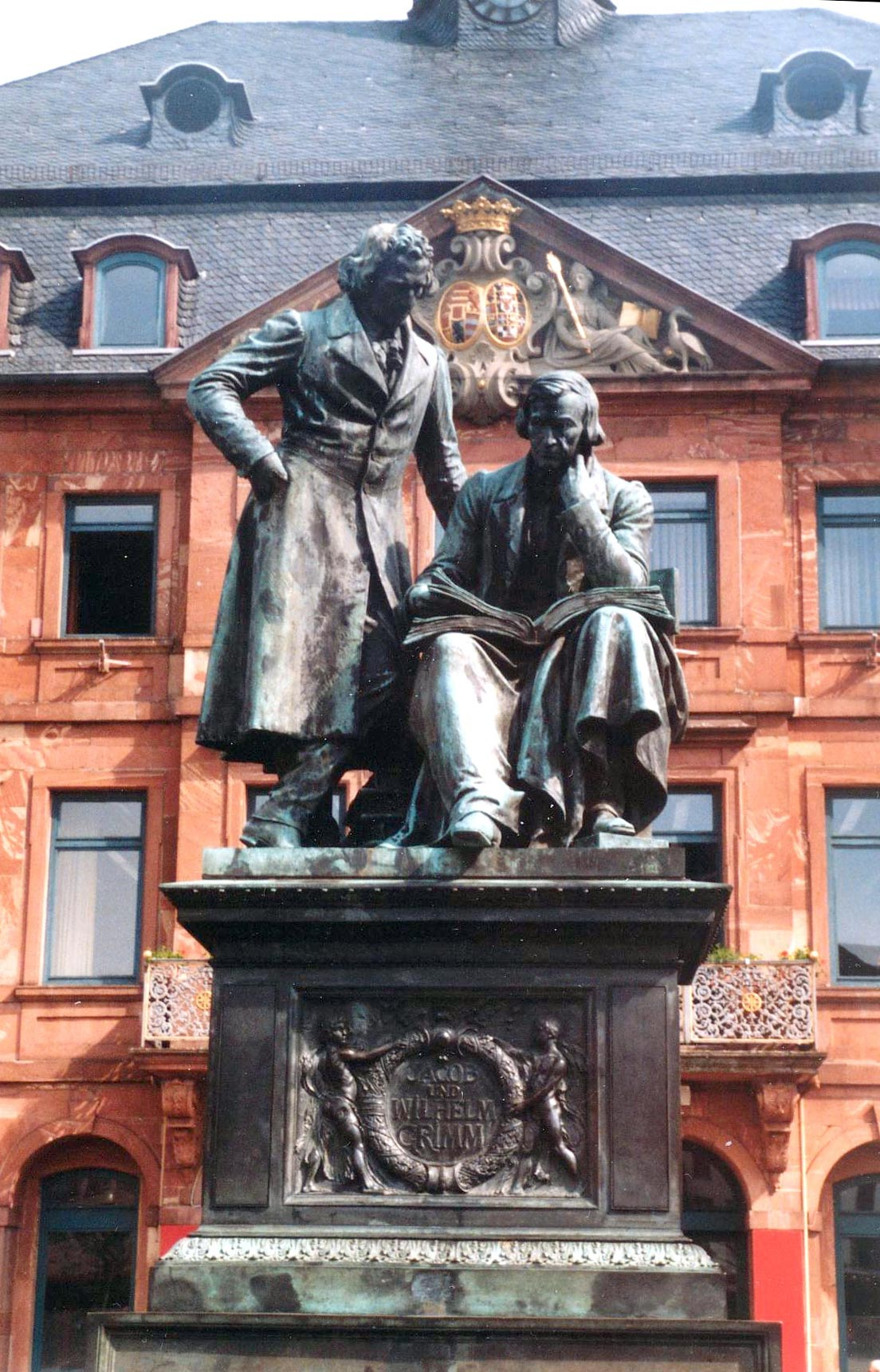
Monument to brothers Grimm in the market place in Hanau (Hessen, Germany)

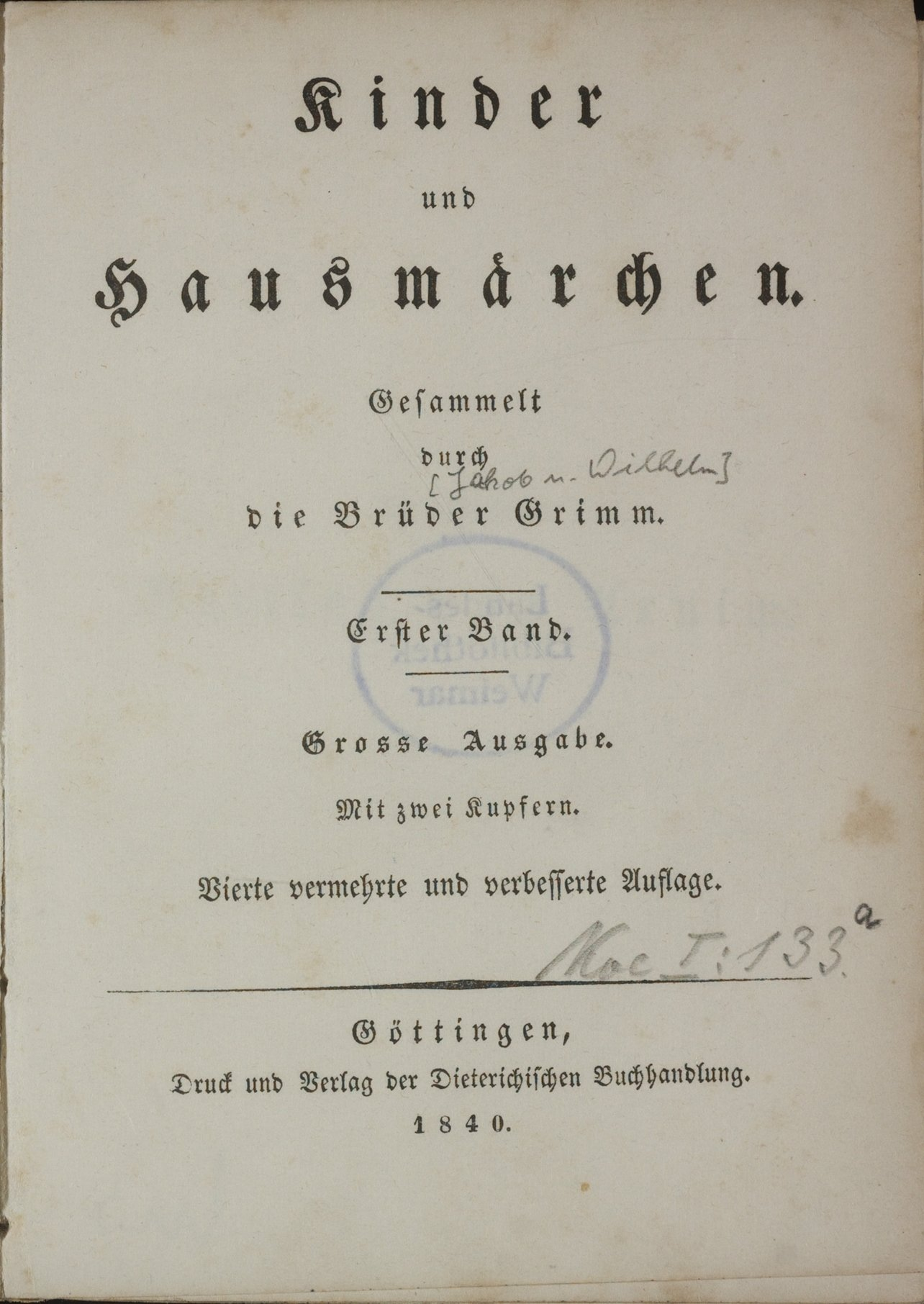
Frontispiece used for the first volume of the 1840 4th edition

- The Frog King, or Iron Heinrich or The Frog Prince (Der Froschkönig oder der eiserne Heinrich): KHM 1
- Cat and Mouse in Partnership (Katze und Maus in Gesellschaft): KHM 2
- Mary's Child (Marienkind): KHM 3
- The Story of the Youth Who Went Forth to Learn What Fear Was (Märchen von einem, der auszog das Fürchten zu lernen): KHM 4
- The Wolf and the Seven Young Kids (Der Wolf und die sieben jungen Geißlein): KHM 5
- Faithful John or Trusty John (Der treue Johannes): KHM 6
- The Good Bargain (Der gute Handel): KHM 7
- The Wonderful Musician or The Strange Musician (Der wunderliche Spielmann): KHM 8
- The Twelve Brothers (Die zwölf Brüder): KHM 9
- The Pack of Ragamuffins (Das Lumpengesindel): KHM 10
- Little Brother and Little Sister (Brüderchen und Schwesterchen): KHM 11
- Rapunzel: KHM 12
- The Three Little Men in the Wood (Die drei Männlein im Walde): KHM 13
- The Three Spinning Women (Die drei Spinnerinnen): KHM 14
- Hansel and Gretel (Hänsel und Gretel): KHM 15
- The Three Snake-Leaves (Die drei Schlangenblätter): KHM 16
- The White Snake (Die weiße Schlange): KHM 17
- The Straw, the Coal, and the Bean (Strohhalm, Kohle und Bohne): KHM 18
- The Fisherman and His Wife (Von dem Fischer und seiner Frau): KHM 19
- The Brave Little Tailor or The Valiant Little Tailor or The Gallant Tailor (Das tapfere Schneiderlein): KHM 20
- Cinderella (Aschenputtel): KHM 21
- The Riddle (Das Rätsel): KHM 22
- The Mouse, the Bird, and the Sausage (Von dem Mäuschen, Vögelchen und der Bratwurst): KHM 23
- Mother Holle or Mother Hulda or Old Mother Frost (Frau Holle): KHM 24
- The Seven Ravens (Die sieben Raben): KHM 25
- Little Red Cap or Little Red Riding Hood (Rotkäppchen): KHM 26
- The Bremen Town Musicians (Die Bremer Stadtmusikanten): KHM 27
- The Singing Bone (Der singende Knochen): KHM 28
- The Devil With the Three Golden Hairs (Der Teufel mit den drei goldenen Haaren): KHM 29
- The Louse and the Flea (Läuschen und Flöhchen): KHM 30
- The Girl Without Hands or The Handless Maiden (Das Mädchen ohne Hände): KHM 31
- Clever Hans (Der gescheite Hans): KHM 32
- The Three Languages (Die drei Sprachen): KHM 33
- Clever Elsie (Die kluge Else): KHM 34
- The Tailor in Heaven (Der Schneider im Himmel): KHM 35
- The Magic Table, the Gold-Donkey, and the Club in the Sack ("Tischchen deck dich, Goldesel und Knüppel aus dem Sack" also known as "Tischlein, deck dich!"): KHM 36
- Thumbling (Daumesdick) (see also Tom Thumb): KHM 37
- The Wedding of Mrs. Fox (Die Hochzeit der Frau Füchsin): KHM 38
- The Elves (Die Wichtelmänner): KHM 39
  - The Elves and the Shoemaker (Erstes Märchen)
  - Second Story (Zweites Märchen)
  - Third Story (Drittes Märchen)
- The Robber Bridegroom (Der Räuberbräutigam): KHM 40
- Herr Korbes: KHM 41
- The Godfather (Der Herr Gevatter): KHM 42
- Mother Trudy (Frau Trude): KHM 43
- Godfather Death (Der Gevatter Tod): KHM 44
- Thumbling's Travels (see also Tom Thumb) (Daumerlings Wanderschaft): KHM 45
- Fitcher's Bird (Fitchers Vogel): KHM 46
- The Juniper Tree (Von dem Machandelboom): KHM 47
- Old Sultan (Der alte Sultan): KHM 48
- The Six Swans (Die sechs Schwäne): KHM 49
- Briar Rose (Dornröschen): KHM 50
- Foundling-Bird (Fundevogel): KHM 51
- King Thrushbeard (König Drosselbart): KHM 52
- Snow White (Schneewittchen): KHM 53
- The Knapsack, the Hat, and the Horn (Der Ranzen, das Hütlein und das Hörnlein): KHM 54
- Rumpelstiltskin (Rumpelstilzchen): KHM 55
- Sweetheart Roland (Der Liebste Roland): KHM 56
- The Golden Bird (Der goldene Vogel): KHM 57
- The Dog and the Sparrow (Der Hund und der Sperling): KHM 58
- Frederick and Catherine (Der Frieder und das Katherlieschen): KHM 59
- The Two Brothers (Die zwei Brüder): KHM 60
- The Little Peasant (Das Bürle): KHM 61
- The Queen Bee (Die Bienenkönigin): KHM 62
- The Three Feathers (Die drei Federn): KHM 63
- The Golden Goose (Die goldene Gans): KHM 64
- All-Kinds-of-Fur (Allerleirauh): KHM 65
- The Hare's Bride (Häsichenbraut): KHM 66
- The Twelve Huntsmen (Die zwölf Jäger): KHM 67
- The Thief and His Master (De Gaudeif un sien Meester): KHM 68
- Jorinde and Joringel (Jorinde und Joringel): KHM 69
- The Three Sons of Fortune (Die drei Glückskinder): KHM 70
- How Six Men got on in the World (Sechse kommen durch die ganze Welt): KHM 71
- The Wolf and the Man (Der Wolf und der Mensch): KHM 72
- The Wolf and the Fox (Der Wolf und der Fuchs): KHM 73
- Gossip Wolf and the Fox (Der Fuchs und die Frau Gevatterin): KHM 74
- The Fox and the Cat (Der Fuchs und die Katze): KHM 75
- The Pink (Die Nelke): KHM 76
- Clever Gretel (Das kluge Gretel): KHM 77
- The Old Man and his Grandson (Der alte Großvater und der Enkel): KHM 78
- The Water Nixie (Die Wassernixe): KHM 79
- The Death of the Little Hen (Von dem Tode des Hühnchens): KHM 80
- Brother Lustig (Bruder Lustig) KHM 81
- Gambling Hansel (De Spielhansl): KHM 82
- Hans in Luck (Hans im Glück): KHM 83
- Hans Married (Hans heiratet): KHM 84
- The Gold-Children (Die Goldkinder): KHM 85
- The Fox and the Geese (Der Fuchs und die Gänse): KHM 86

=== Volume 2 ===
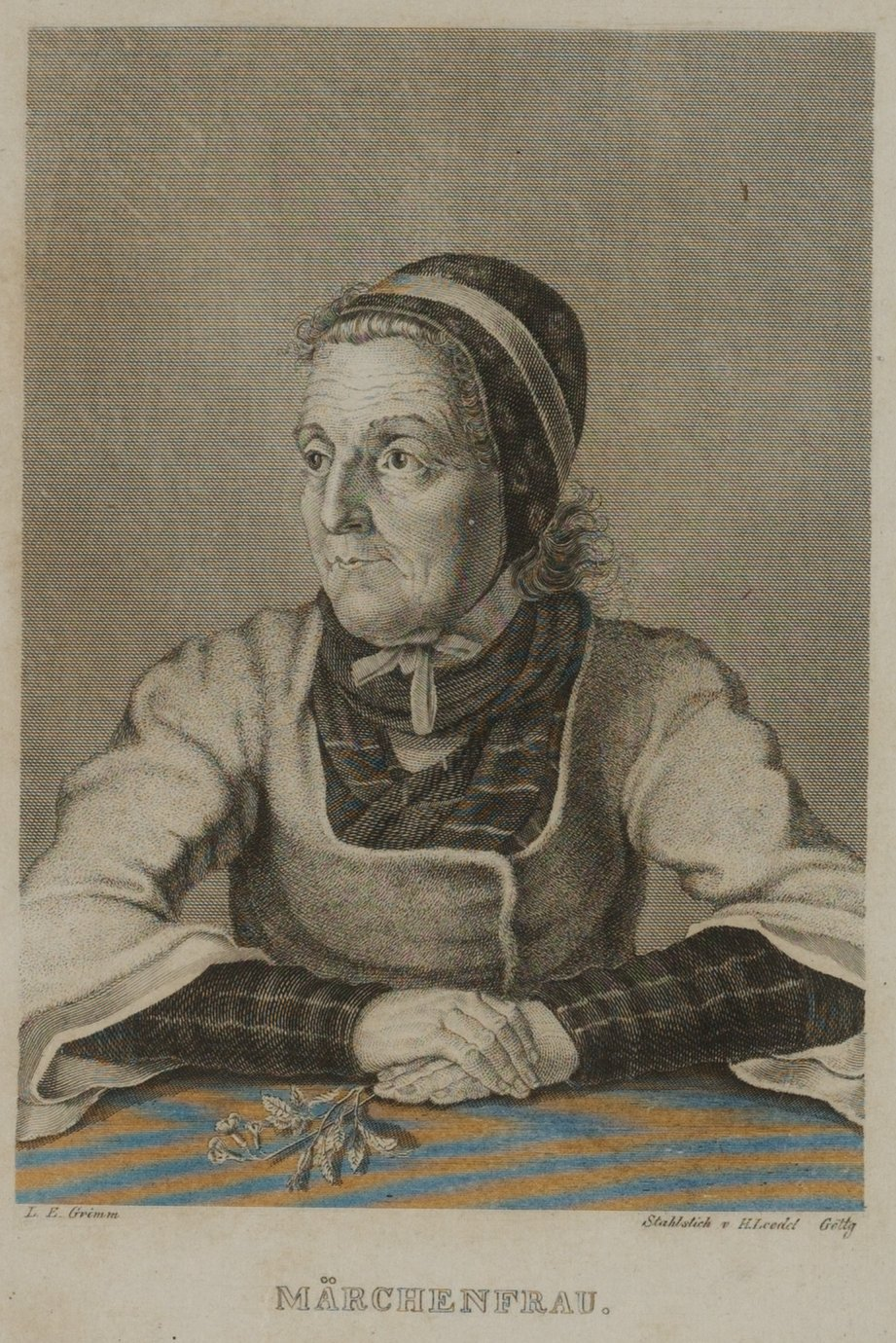
Frontispiece used for the second volume of the 1840 4th edition. The portrait by Ludwig Emil Grimm bears resemblance to the storyteller Dorothea Viehmann.

- The Poor Man and the Rich Man (Der Arme und der Reiche): KHM 87
- The Singing, Springing Lark (Das singende springende Löweneckerchen): KHM 88
- The Goose Girl (Die Gänsemagd): KHM 89
- The Young Giant (Der junge Riese): KHM 90
- The Gnome (Dat Erdmänneken): KHM 91
- The King of the Gold Mountain (Der König vom goldenen Berg): KHM 92
- The Raven (Die Raben): KHM 93
- The Peasant's Wise Daughter (Die kluge Bauerntochter): KHM 94
- Old Hildebrand (Der alte Hildebrand): KHM 95
- The Three Little Birds (De drei Vügelkens): KHM 96
- The Water of Life (Das Wasser des Lebens): KHM 97
- Doctor Know-all (Doktor Allwissend): KHM 98
- The Spirit in the Bottle (Der Geist im Glas): KHM 99
- The Devil's Sooty Brother (Des Teufels rußiger Bruder): KHM 100
- Bearskin (Bärenhäuter): KHM 101
- The Willow Wren and the Bear (Der Zaunkönig und der Bär): KHM 102
- Sweet Porridge (Der süße Brei): KHM 103
- Wise Folks (Die klugen Leute): KHM 104
- Tales of the Paddock (Märchen von der Unke): KHM 105
- The Poor Miller's Boy and the Cat (Der arme Müllerbursch und das Kätzchen): KHM 106
- The Two Travelers (Die beiden Wanderer): KHM 107
- Hans My Hedgehog (Hans mein Igel): KHM 108
- The Shroud (Das Totenhemdchen): KHM 109
- The Jew Among Thorns (Der Jude im Dorn): KHM 110
- The Skillful Huntsman (Der gelernte Jäger): KHM 111
- The Flail from Heaven (Der Dreschflegel vom Himmel): KHM 112
- The Two Kings' Children (Die beiden Königskinder): KHM 113
- The Cunning Little Tailor or The Story of a Clever Tailor (vom klugen Schneiderlein): KHM 114
- The Bright Sun Brings it to Light (Die klare Sonne bringt's an den Tag): KHM 115
- The Blue Light (Das blaue Licht): KHM 116
- The Willful Child (Das eigensinnige Kind): KHM 117
- The Three Army Surgeons (Die drei Feldscherer): KHM 118
- The Seven Swabians (Die sieben Schwaben): KHM 119
- The Three Apprentices (Die drei Handwerksburschen): KHM 120
- The King's Son Who Feared Nothing (Der Königssohn, der sich vor nichts fürchtete): KHM 121
- Donkey Cabbages (Der Krautesel): KHM 122
- The Old Woman in the Wood (Die Alte im Wald): KHM 123
- The Three Brothers (Die drei Brüder): KHM 124
- The Devil and His Grandmother (Der Teufel und seine Großmutter): KHM 125
- Ferdinand the Faithful and Ferdinand the Unfaithful (Ferenand getrü und Ferenand ungetrü): KHM 126
- The Iron Stove (Der Eisenofen): KHM 127
- The Lazy Spinner (Die faule Spinnerin): KHM 128
- The Four Skillful Brothers (Die vier kunstreichen Brüder): KHM 129
- One-Eye, Two-Eyes, and Three-Eyes (Einäuglein, Zweiäuglein und Dreiäuglein): KHM 130
- Fair Katrinelje and Pif-Paf-Poltrie (Die schöne Katrinelje und Pif Paf Poltrie): KHM 131
- The Fox and the Horse (Der Fuchs und das Pferd): KHM 132
- The Shoes that were Danced to Pieces (Die zertanzten Schuhe): KHM 133
- The Six Servants (Die sechs Diener): KHM 134
- The White and the Black Bride (Die weiße und die schwarze Braut): KHM 135
- Iron John (Eisenhans): KHM 136
- The Three Black Princesses (De drei schwatten Prinzessinnen): KHM 137
- Knoist and his Three Sons (Knoist un sine dre Sühne): KHM 138
- The Maid of Brakel (Dat Mäken von Brakel): KHM 139
- My Household (Das Hausgesinde): KHM 140
- The Lambkin and the Little Fish (Das Lämmchen und das Fischchen): KHM 141
- Simeli Mountain (Simeliberg): KHM 142
- Going a Traveling (Up Reisen gohn): KHM 143, appeared in the 1819 edition
  - KHM 143 in the 1812/1815 edition was Die Kinder in Hungersnot (The Starving Children)
- The Donkey or The Little Donkey (Das Eselein): KHM 144 (Note: "The Little Donkey" is the more precisely translated title.)
- The Ungrateful Son (Der undankbare Sohn): KHM 145
- The Turnip (Die Rübe): KHM 146
- The Old Man Made Young Again (Das junggeglühte Männlein): KHM 147
- The Lord's Animals and the Devil's (Des Herrn und des Teufels Getier): KHM 148
- The Beam (Der Hahnenbalken): KHM 149
- The Old Beggar Woman (Die alte Bettelfrau): KHM 150
- The Three Sluggards (Die drei Faulen): KHM 151
- The Twelve Idle Servants (Die zwölf faulen Knechte): KHM 151a
- The Shepherd Boy (Das Hirtenbüblein): KHM 152
- The Star Money (Die Sterntaler): KHM 153
- The Stolen Farthings (Der gestohlene Heller): KHM 154
- Looking for a Bride (Die Brautschau): KHM 155
- The Hurds (Die Schlickerlinge): KHM 156
- The Sparrow and His Four Children (Der Sperling und seine vier Kinder): KHM 157
- The Story of Schlauraffen Land (Das Märchen vom Schlaraffenland): KHM 158
- The Ditmarsch Tale of Lies (Das dietmarsische Lügenmärchen): KHM 159
- A Riddling Tale (Rätselmärchen): KHM 160
- Snow-White and Rose-Red (Schneeweißchen und Rosenrot): KHM 161
- The Wise Servant (Der kluge Knecht): KHM 162
- The Glass Coffin (Der gläserne Sarg): KHM 163
- Lazy Henry (Der faule Heinz): KHM 164
- The Griffin (Der Vogel Greif): KHM 165
- Strong Hans (Der starke Hans): KHM 166
- The Peasant in Heaven (Das Bürle im Himmel): KHM 167
- Lean Lisa (Die hagere Liese): KHM 168
- The Hut in the Forest (Das Waldhaus): KHM 169
- Sharing Joy and Sorrow (Lieb und Leid teilen): KHM 170
- The Willow Wren (Der Zaunkönig): KHM 171
- The Sole (Die Scholle): KHM 172
- The Bittern and the Hoopoe (Rohrdommel und Wiedehopf): KHM 173
- The Owl (Die Eule): KHM 174
- The Moon (Der Mond): KHM 175
- The Duration of Life (Die Lebenszeit): KHM 176
- Death's Messengers (Die Boten des Todes): KHM 177
- Master Pfreim (Meister Pfriem): KHM 178
- The Goose-Girl at the Well (Die Gänsehirtin am Brunnen): KHM 179
- Eve's Various Children (Die ungleichen Kinder Evas): KHM 180
- The Nixie of the Mill-Pond (Die Nixe im Teich): KHM 181
- The Gifts of the Little People/The Little Folks' Presents(Die Geschenke des kleinen Volkes): KHM 182 (Note: Aliases: "The Gifts of the Little People"; "The Little Folks' Presents". This is the type tale of AT 503, and "The Gifts of the Little People" is its official English title, insofar as Hans-Jörg Uther has published it, and most folklorists tend to follow it.)
- The Giant and the Tailor (Der Riese und der Schneider): KHM 183
- The Nail (Der Nagel): KHM 184
- The Poor Boy in the Grave (Der arme Junge im Grab): KHM 185
- The True Bride (Die wahre Braut): KHM 186
- The Hare and the Hedgehog (Der Hase und der Igel): KHM 187
- Spindle, Shuttle, and Needle (Spindel, Weberschiffchen und Nadel): KHM 188
- The Peasant and the Devil (Der Bauer und der Teufel): KHM 189
- The Crumbs on the Table (Die Brosamen auf dem Tisch): KHM 190
- The Sea-Hare (Das Meerhäschen): KHM 191
- The Master Thief (Der Meisterdieb): KHM 192
- The Drummer (Der Trommler): KHM 193
- The Ear of Corn (Die Kornähre): KHM 194
- The Grave Mound (Der Grabhügel): KHM 195
- Old Rinkrank (Oll Rinkrank): KHM 196
- The Crystal Ball (Die Kristallkugel): KHM 197
- Maid Maleen (Jungfrau Maleen): KHM 198
- The Boots of Buffalo Leather (Der Stiefel von Büffelleder): KHM 199
- The Golden Key (Der goldene Schlüssel): KHM 200

The children's legends (Kinder-legende)
First appeared in the G. Reimer 1819 edition at the end of volume 2.

- Saint Joseph in the Forest (Der heilige Joseph im Walde): KHM 201
- The Twelve Apostles (Die zwölf Apostel): KHM 202
- The Rose (Die Rose): KHM 203
- Poverty and Humility Lead to Heaven (Armut und Demut führen zum Himmel): KHM 204
- The Divine Manna (Gottes Speise): KHM 205
- The Three Green Twigs (Die drei grünen Zweige): KHM 206
- The Blessed Virgin's Little Glass (Muttergottesgläschen) or Our Lady's Little Glass: KHM 207
- The Little Old Lady (Das alte Mütterchen) or The Aged Mother: KHM 208
- The Heavenly Marriage (Die himmlische Hochzeit) or The Heavenly Wedding: KHM 209
- The Hazel Branch (Die Haselrute): KHM 210

=== Removed from final edition ===
- 1812 KHM 6 The Nightingale and the Blindworm (Von der Nachtigall und der Blindschleiche) also (The Nightingale and the Slow worm)
- 1812 KHM 8 The Hand with the Knife (Die Hand mit dem Messer)
- 1812 KHM 16 Mr. Ready and Done (Herr Fix und Fertig)
- 1812 KHM 22 The Children Who Played Slaughtering (Wie Kinder Schlachtens miteinander gespielt haben)
- 1812 KHM 27 Death and the Goose Keeper (Der Tod und der Gänsehirt)
- 1812 KHM 33 Puss in Boots (Der gestiefelte Kater)
- 1812 KHM 34 Hansen's Telling Stars (Hansen Trine)
- 1812 KHM 37 The Napkin, the Knapsack, the Cannon Shell, and the Horn (Von der Serviette, dem Tornister, dem Kanonenhütlein und dem Horn)
- 1812 KHM 43 The Strange Inn/The Wonderly Guesting Manor (Die wunderliche Gasterei)
- 1812 KHM 54 Hans Folly (Hans Dumm)
- 1812 KHM 59 The Swan Prince (Prinz Schwan)
- 1812 KHM 60 The Golden Egg (Das Goldei)
- 1812 KHM 61 The Tailor's Tale of the Blessed Fortune (Von dem Schneider, der bald reich wurde)
- 1812 KHM 62 Bluebeard (Blaubart)
- 1812 KHM 64A The White Dove (under the title Von dem Dummling)
- 1812 KHM 66 (The King's Hasty Promise/The Dwarf, the Fox and the Princess) (Hurleburlebutz)
- 1812 KHM 68 The Summer and Winter Garden (Von dem Sommer- und Wintergarten)
- 1812 KHM 70 The Ogre (fairytale) (Der Okerlo)
- 1812 KHM 71 Princess Mouse Skin (Prinzessin Mäusehaut)
- 1812 KHM 72 The Pear Doesn't Want to Fall (Das Birnli will nit fallen)
- 1812 KHM 73 The Murder Castle (Das Mörderschloss)
- 1812 KHM 74 From Johannes-Wassersprung and Caspar-Wassersprung (Von Johannes-Wassersprung und Caspar-Wassersprung)
- 1812 KHM 75 Phoenix Bird (Vogel Phönix)
- 1812 KHM 77 The Carpenter and the Turner (Vom Schreiner und Drechsler)
- 1812 KHM 81 The Blacksmith and the Devil (Der Schmied und der Teufel)
- 1812 KHM 82 The Three Sisters (Die drei Schwestern)
- 1812 KHM 84 The Mother In Law (Die Schwiegermutter)
- 1812 KHM 85A Fragment of Snow Flower (Schneeblume)
- 1812 KHM 85B Princess With The Louse (Prinzessin mit der Laus)
- 1812 KHM 85C From Prince John (fragmentation) (Vom Prinz Johannes)
- 1812 KHM 85D The Good Rag (fragmentation) (Der gute Lappen)
- 1815 KHM 99 The Frog Prince (Der Froschprinz)
- 1815 KHM 104 The Faithful Animals (Die treuen Tiere)
- 1815 KHM 107 The Crows (Die Krähen)
- 1815 KHM 119 The Sluggard and the Diligent (Der Faule und der Fleißige)
- 1815 KHM 122 The Long Nose (Die lange Nase)
- 1815 KHM 129 The Lion and the Frog (Der Löwe und der Frosch)
- 1815 KHM 130 The Soldier and the Carpenter (Der Soldat und der Schreiner)
- 1815 KHM 136 The Wild Man (De wilde Mann)
- 1815 KHM 143 The Starving Children (Die Kinder in Hungersnot)
- 1815 KHM 152 Saint Solicitous (Die heilige Frau Kummernis)
- 1840 KHM 175 The Accident (Das Unglück)
- 1843 KHM 182 Princess and the Pea (Die Erbsenprobe)
- 1843 KHM 191 The Robber and His Sons (Der Räuber und seine Söhne)

== See also ==
- Grimm Tales (disambiguation)
- Grimm's Fairy Tale Classics, a Japanese anime anthology series
- Grimm Fairy Tales (comics), a dark fantasy comic book series

== Bibliography ==
- Grimm, Jacob; Grimm, Wilhelm (1884). Grimm's Household Tales: With the Author's Notes. Vol. 1. Translated by Margaret Hunt. London: George Bell and Sons.; volume 2; vol. 1, vol. 2 via Internet Archive
- ——; —— (2015) [1982]. Brothers Grimm: Selected Tales. Translated by Luke, David; McKay, Gilbert; Schofield, Philip. London: Penguin. ISBN 0241245052.
- ——; —— (1903). Grimm's Fairy Tales. Translated by Edna Henry Lee Turpin. New York: Maynard, Merrill, & Co. ISBN 9781438158952.
- ——; —— (2003). Zipes, Jack (ed.). The Complete Fairy Tales of the Brothers Grimm All-New Third Edition. Random House Publishing Group. ISBN 0553897403.
- ——; —— (2016) [2014]. Zipes, Jack (ed.). The Original Folk and Fairy Tales of the Brothers Grimm: The Complete First Edition. Princeton University Press. ISBN 0691173222. OCLC 879662315.
- Uther, Hans-Jörg (2004). The Types of International Folktales: Animal tales, tales of magic, religious tales, and realistic tales, with an introduction. FF Communications. p. 263.
- Ashliman, D.L. (1998–2020). The Grimm Brothers Children's and Household Tales (Grimms' Fairy Tales). University of Pittsburgh.
