= Odds and Ends =

Odds and Ends may refer to:

- "Odds and Ends" (song), a 1969 song by Dionne Warwick
- Odds & Ends (album), a 1995 collection of unfinished tracks and demo recordings by Dido
- The Hurds, also called "Odds and Ends", a folktale collected by the Brothers Grimm.

== See also ==
- To the Stars... Demos, Odds and Ends, a 2015 album by Tom DeLonge
