= Willful =

Willful or wilful may refer to:

- with mens rea, the mental state of a crime
  - Intention (criminal law)
  - Willful blindness or Wilful ignorance, intentionally putting oneself in a position where oneself will be unaware of facts that would render oneself liable
  - Willful damage, vandalism
  - Wilful fire raising, Scottish common law offence
- Willful violation of workplace rules and policies, either deliberately or as a result of neglect

== Media ==
- Willful Murder, a 1981 Japanese drama film directed by Kei Kumai
- The Willful Child, a German fairy tale collected by the Brothers Grimm
- The Willful Wife, an 1845 French ballet
