= Anthropomorphized food =

Depictions of food with human characteristics

An anthropomorphized food is a food which had been attributed human traits, emotions, or intentions. Foods with human characteristics often appear in culture and in modern media and are often given the anecdotal properties.

== Neuromarketing ==
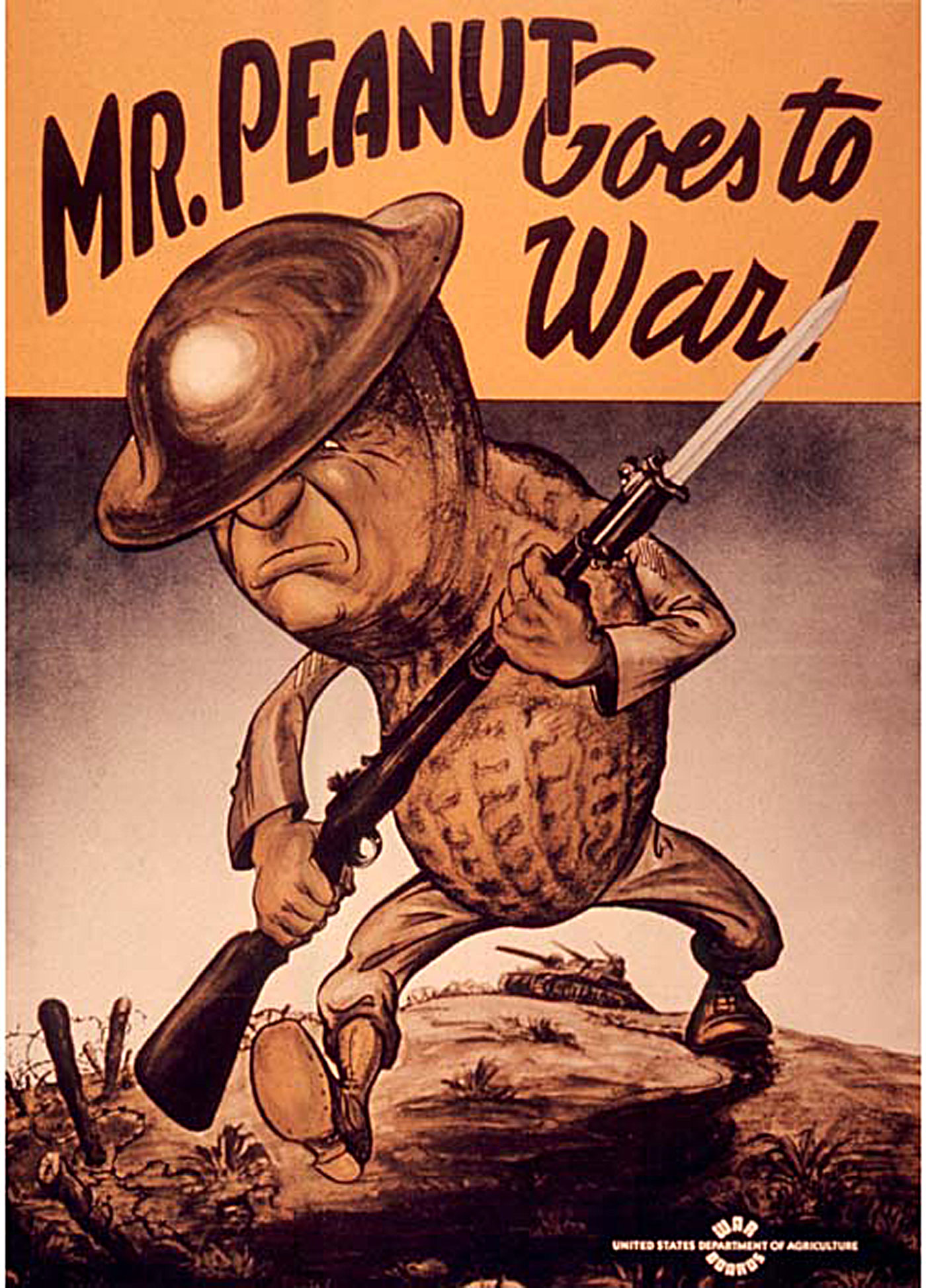
Poster that uses the character Mr. Peanut, mascot of the Planters snack food company, to emotionally influence the audience.

In marketing, the aim of anthropomorphism is to establish or mimic human-like emotional connection between the consumer and the product. Research shows that it increases the attractiveness of the product for adults and decreases it for children. The exception to this is when meat products are given personality, which causes guilt in consumers, since they are less likely to eat meat when they rely on their emotions. It can also increase the desirability of foods that are considered "ugly" by default, consumers will not waste food, especially when these characters are sad, evoking empathy from the consumer. The type of food and the proportions of the face also play a big role in the effectiveness of the mascot.

== In folklore ==
The folktale The Mouse, the Bird, and the Sausage portrays the sausage as a friend of the two animals and a great cook.

The Japanese Yokai Shio no Choji is a spirit of a horse connected to its meat which proceeded to torture the man eating it by forcing itself down his throat.

== See also ==
- Animism
