= Grim Tales =

British children's television program

- Developed by: Rikki Finegold; Bob Baldwin
- Written by: Anne Caulfield; Anthony Horowitz
- Directed by: Bob Baldwin
- Starring: Rik Mayall
- Composers: Ged Haney; Clive Bell
- Country of origin: United Kingdom
- Original language: English
- No. of series: 2
- No. of episodes: 22

Production
- Producers: Corinne Westacott Sharon Burns; Bob Baldwin
- Running time: 11 minutes
- Production companies: Initial Film & Television; Central Independent Television (series 1)

Original release
- Network: ITV (CITV) (series 1); Channel 4 (series 2)
- Release: 14 April 1989 – 17 March 1991

Grim Tales is a British children's television program based on fairy tales by the Brothers Grimm, featuring Rik Mayall as a storyteller dressed in pyjamas and a dressing gown. The twenty-two episodes were broadcast on ITV (series 1)Producer Corinne Westacott and Channel 4 (series 2) Producer Sharon Burns from 1989 to 1991. There was also a release on video and audio cassette, with the slightly different title Grimm Tales.

== Synopsis ==
Mayall tells the tales in his own inimitable way from his armchair, designed by David Barrington Holt, complete with paws and ostrich legs. The set was designed by building designer Julian Cripps. The stories are usually interspersed with animation, often abstract animation, and are directed by Bob Baldwin, with music by composed by Ged Haney and arranged by Clive Bell.

The stories were adapted by Anne Caulfield and Anthony Horowitz.

== Episodes ==
=== Series 1 (1989) ===
Series 1
No. overall	No. in season	Title	Original release date
1	1	"The Three Feathers"	14 April 1989
Animation by Emma Calder and Jed Haney of Pearly Oyster Productions.
2	2	"The Spirit in the Bottle"	21 April 1989
Animation by Jonathan Hodgson of Felix Films Ltd.
3	3	"The Hare and the Hedgehog"	28 April 1989
Animation by Mike Bennion and Keith Rogerson of Blink Productions Ltd.
4	4	"The Valiant Little Tailor"	5 May 1989
Animation by Jonathan Webber and Tim Sanpher of Felix Films Ltd.
5	5	"Rapunzel"	12 May 1989
Animation by Gill Bradley.
6	6	"The Fisherman and His Wife"	19 May 1989
Animation by 3 Peach Animation.
7	7	"The Three Little Men in the Wood"	26 May 1989
8	8	"Hansel and Gretel"	2 June 1989
Animation by Mole Hill and Julian Roberts.
9	9	"Rumpelstiltskin"	9 June 1989
A miller boasts to a King that his daughter can spin straw into gold. The King promptly locks the daughter in a room full of straw, demanding she spin it all into gold or she will lose her head. She bursts into tears, then a little green man appears saying he can spin it into gold in exchange for her necklace. He succeeds, but the King simply locks her in a bigger room, demanding the same. The little man appears again and spins the straw in exchange for the girl's ring. The King then repeats the deal with a still larger room, though this time if she succeeds he will make her his wife. The little man reappears but the daughter has nothing left to give him. He then says he will spin the straw in exchange for her next child, the daughter agrees, the straw is spun and she becomes Queen. Unfortunately, she has a daughter and the little green man appears demanding payment, she begs him not to, he compromises saying she can keep the baby if she guesses his name in three days. She tries dozens of wrong names-much to the little man's amusement. On the third day a soldier tells her she's seen a little green man dancing and singing a silly song about his name-Rumpelstiltskin. She gets the name right, the little man is so furious he stamps his foot so hard he cannot get it off and pulls it off. She names the baby Phewww! Rik Mayall added a personal touch to this story by mentioning the names of his children in the list of the daughters guesses. Puppetry by Faulty Optic Theatre of Animation.
10	10	"The Twelve Huntsmen"	16 June 1989
Animation by Mike Smith and Susan Young of Felix Films Ltd.
11	11	"Sweet Porridge"	23 June 1989
Animation by David Lodger of Snapper.
12	12	"The Three Doctors"	30 June 1989
Three boastful Doctors stay at an inn, the innkeeper demands proof that they really are the cleverest Doctors in the world. They promptly cut off their own hand (doctor 1), heart (doctor 2) and eyes (doctor 3), keeping them in a fridge, planning to use a special ointment (given to them by a witch) to reattach them the next day. Unfortunately, the innkeeper's cat eats the organs. They are replaced by a thief's hand, pig's heart and the cat's eyes. After leaving the inn, one doctor finds himself pickpocketing, another wants to grunt and roll in mud, the third wants to eat mice and miaow. They all learn a bit of humility. Animation by 3 Peach Animation.

=== Series 2 (1991) ===
Series 1
No. overall	No. in season	Title	Original release date
13	1	"The Bremen Town Musicians"	13 January 1991
14	2	"The Witch Among Thorns"	20 January 1991
Animation by Jayne Bevitt and Hannah Strange of Felix Films Ltd.
15	3	"The Griffin"	27 January 1991
16	4	"The Frog Prince"	3 February 1991
17	5	"The Boots of Buffalo Leather"	10 February 1991
18	6	"The Gnome"	17 February 1991
Animation by Tobias Fouracre.
19	7	"King Thrushbeard"	24 February 1991
Animation by Philip Hunt of 3 Peach Animation.
20	8	"The Turnip"	3 March 1991
Animation by Mike Walker.
21	9	"The Little Peasant"	10 March 1991
Animation by Wrench & Franks with Frank Passingham.
22	10	"The Wolf and the Seven Little Kids"	17 March 1991
