= The Peasant in Heaven =

German fairy tale

Folk tale
- Name: The Peasant in Heaven
- Aarne–Thompson grouping: ATU 802
- Country: Germany
- Published in: Grimms' Fairy Tales

"The Peasant in Heaven" is a German fairy tale collected by the Brothers Grimm in Grimm's Fairy Tales, number 167.

It is Aarne-Thompson Type 802.

== Synopsis ==
A Peasant and a Rich Man went to Heaven. Saint Peter let the Rich Man in but overlooked the Peasant; there was then great rejoicing and music in Heaven. Then St Peter noticed the Peasant and let him in, but there was no celebration. When the Peasant asked why, St Peter said that many poor people go to Heaven, but a rich man does only once a century or so.

== Origin ==
Grimm's comment reads: Told in the best way by Friedrich Schmid near Arau. Wilhelm Wackernagel sent it to them along with KHM 165 Der Vogel Greif. The oldest literary precursor is the poem Das Bürle im Himmel. A fairy tale by Daniel Schubart (1774).

The basis is evidently the Bible words It is easier for a camel to go through the eye of a needle than for a rich man to enter the kingdom of God (ark 10, 25, Matthew 19, 24, Luke 18, 25) and So there will also be joy in heaven over a sinner who repents before ninety-nine righteous who have no need of repentance (Luke 15:7).

More Peter farce in Grimm: KHM 35 The Tailor in Heaven, KHM 81 Brother merry, KHM 82 Gambling Hansel, KHM 175 The moon.
