= The Crumbs on the Table =

German fairy tale

Folk tale
- Name: The Crumbs on the Table
- Aarne–Thompson grouping: ATU 236
- Country: Germany
- Published in: Grimms' Fairy Tales

"The Crumbs on the Table" is a German fairy tale collected by the Brothers Grimm, number 190.

It is Aarne-Thompson type 236*, Imitating Bird Sounds, because in the original Swiss dialect, the responses imitate live chickens.

== Synopsis ==
A rooster tells his chicklets to come into the parlor and take the crumbs. They refuse, because the mistress will beat them, but he persists and persuades them. The mistress returns just then and beats them, but the rooster only laughs and says that he knew it would happen.
