= Going a Traveling =

German fairy tale

Folk tale
- Name: Going a Traveling
- Aarne–Thompson grouping: 1696
- Country: Germany
- Published in: Grimms' Fairy Tales

"Going a Traveling" is a German fairy tale collected by the Brothers Grimm in Grimm's Fairy Tales, tale number 143. It is Aarne-Thompson type 1696, What Should I Have Said?.

== Synopsis ==
A long long time ago there lived a mother and her son. The son told the mother that he wanted to go out a traveling. The mother was very worried about it since they were very poor. The son told her that he would be fine, and he would always say "not much".

One day on his travels, he passed by a group of fishermen while he was saying "not much". The fishermen could not catch any fish and were very angry at him. He asked them what he should be saying instead. They told him to say "Get it full".

He continued to say "get it full, get it full" while he was traveling. Then he passed by a gallows when some prisoners were being hanged. The executioner got angry and said, "so it is good to have more criminals?". The young man asked what he should be saying instead. The executioner told him to say "God, please have pity on the poor soul".

Then he came across a group of knackers who were skinning a horse while he was saying "God, please have pity on the poor soul." The knackers got mad and told him to say "there lies the dead flesh in the pit".

So the young man kept on traveling while he was saying "there lies the dead flesh in the pit." A cart passed by and fell into a pit. The people in the cart were mad and start attacking the young man. He ran back home and never went out a traveling again in his life.
