= The Old Woman in the Wood =

German fairy tale

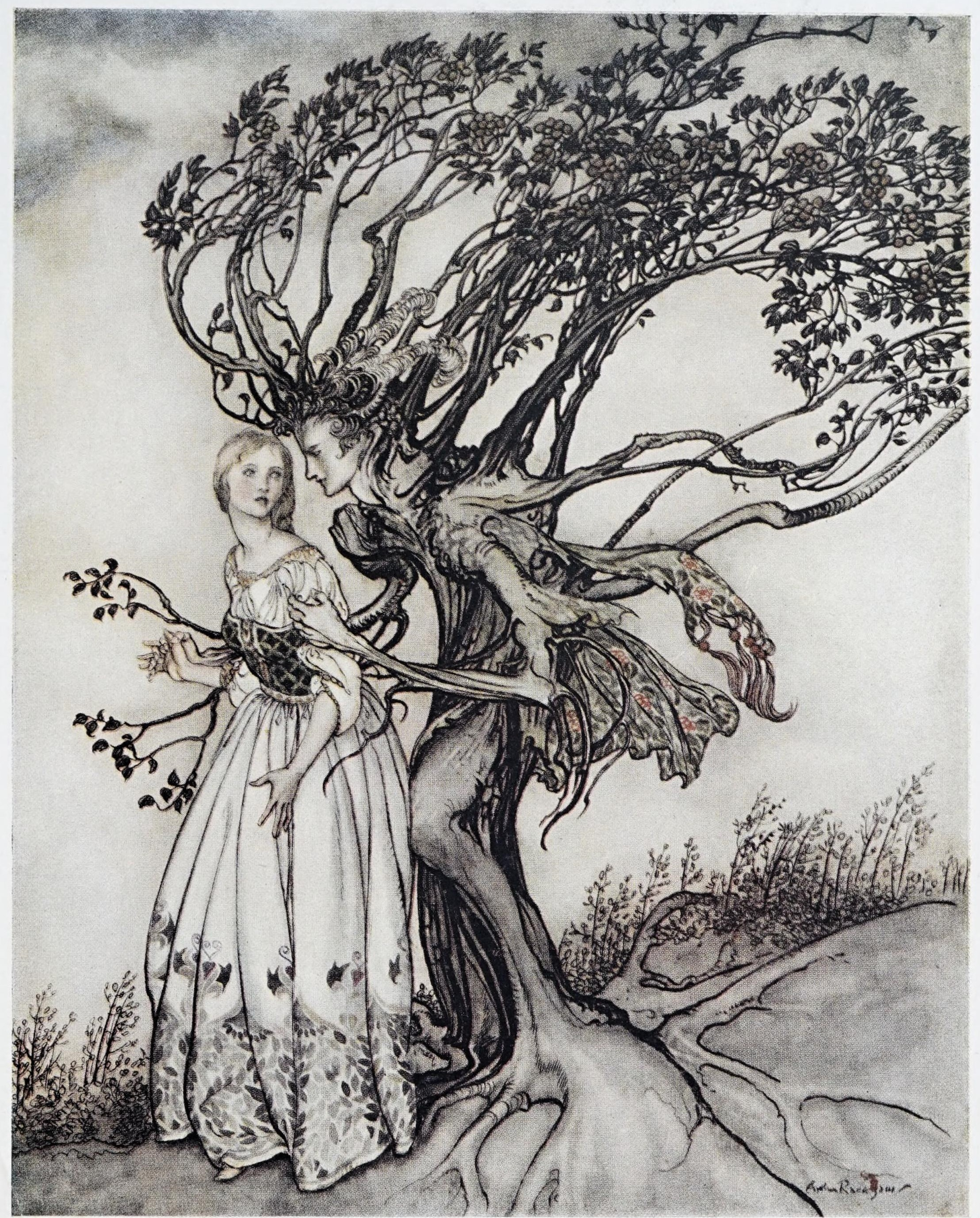
- "Suddenly the branches twined round her and turned into two arms." Illustration by Arthur Rackham, 1917.

Folk tale
- Name: The Old Woman in the Wood
- Aarne–Thompson grouping: ATU 442, "The Old Woman in the Woods"
- Country: Germany
- Published in: Grimms' Fairy Tales

"The Old Woman in the Wood" (German: Die Alte im Wald) is a German fairy tale collected by the Brothers Grimm, tale number 123. It is Aarne-Thompson type 442.

== Synopsis ==
A beautiful but poor servant girl was traveling with the family she worked for when robbers attacked them. She hid behind a tree, but no one else survived. She lamented her fate and a dove came to her with a golden key. He told her to unlock a tree and she found food there. In the evening, he brought her to a tree with a bed. She lived like this for many days. When the dove asked her to do something for him, she agreed. He told her to go to a house and go in. An old woman would greet her, but she should not answer. She should open an inner door, which will reveal a room full of splendid rings, but she should take a plain one.

The old woman was quite angry, but the girl did not heed her. Then, when she could not see the plain ring, she saw the old woman trying to carry off a birdcage. She took it away from her. It held a bird, which held the ring in its beak, so she took it outside and waited against a tree. Two branches turned into arms about her as the tree turned into a handsome man who kissed her. He told her that the old woman was a witch who had turned him into a tree, and for two hours a day, he became a dove, and she had freed him. All his attendants turned back from trees to humans as well. With the prince being the king's son, they went to his father's kingdom and got married.

== Analysis ==
The tale is classified in the international Aarne-Thompson-Uther Index as tale type ATU 442, "The Old Woman in the Woods" (previously, "The Old Man in the Woods"): the heroine survives a robbers' attack by hiding up a tree; a dove flies in and gives her a key which she can use to open three nearby trees; the heroine then goes to the house of an old woman in the woods to fetch a ring; in doing so, the heroine releases a prince from an arboreal form.

== In popular culture ==
"The Old Woman in the Wood" is featured in Grimm's Fairy Tale Classics, with several changes. The talking dove is an owl, his tree form only appears at the end, and in his owl form, he has more direct interactions with the servant girl, here named Lisbeth. The witch attacks the family with a horde of goblins instead of a band of robbers. The tasks that Lisbeth faces are slightly different from the original ones: she must go inside the house when the witch isn't home; look for a specific magical key in the witch's treasury, one whose handle is shaped like a human head; use it on a specific door (which turns out to be the nose of a skull placed on top of a rotating shelf); then find a gold ring and bring it to the owl. In addition, she cannot talk or even scream while she is in the house.

== See also ==
- The Hut in the Forest
- Jorinde and Joringel
