= Lazy Henry =

German fairy tale

Folk tale
- Name: Lazy Henry
- Aarne–Thompson grouping: ATU 1430
- Country: Germany
- Published in: Grimms' Fairy Tales

"Lazy Henry" or "Lazy Heinz" is a German fairy tale collected by the Brothers Grimm in Grimm's Fairy Tales, number 164. It was first added in the third edition.

It is Aarne-Thompson type 1430, Air Castles.

== Synopsis ==
Henry was so lazy he minded his only task, driving a goat to pasture and back. He married Fat Trina so she would drive both his and her goats. Trina proposed trading the goats for a hive, which would not need tending. They gather a pitcher of honey and discuss whether to get a gosling. Trina wants a child to look after it; Henry says that children don't obey, any more than a servant does. Trina goes to hit him with a stick and breaks the pitcher. They agree that this way they do not have to look after the goose.

== Allusions ==
Harry refers to The Wise Servant, Grimm tale number 162, with the complaint about a servant.
