= The Sparrow and His Four Children =

Fairy tale collected by the Brothers Grimm

Folk tale
- Name: The Sparrow and His Four Children
- Country: Germany
- Published in: Grimms' Fairy Tales

"The Sparrow and His Four Children" is a story from Grimms' Fairy Tales. The story number was changed from #35 to #157 from the 2nd edition onwards. In Boltes Anmerkungen, he mentions that the tale is from the deep Middle Ages. It was taken from the seventh sermon in Johannes Mathesius Historien von Martin Luther (1563), but it goes back further to Aesop's fables also. In the 1812 Anhang (appendix), it is listed as coming from “Out of Schuppii Schriften. (Fabul. Hans S. 837. 38.).” It is an almost exact transcription of the story from the 1677[?] published book.

== Synopsis ==
Four young sparrows leave their nest, while their father griefs and worries about them. In the autumn, he meets his four children again and asks them where they have been. All four explain where they each one of them spent their time, while he gives them fatherly advice on what dangers they should try to avoid. He then directs himself to his youngest child, whom he wants to stay with him a little longer, so he can protect him against potential dangers. Yet the youngest sparrow explains that, during a storm, he hid himself in a church, where he was given heavenly advice from God and thus always safe. The father sparrow agrees and then delivers his moral that whoever commits himself to God will be protected by Him.
