= The Ear of Corn =

German fairy tale

Folk tale
- Name: The Ear of Corn
- Aarne–Thompson grouping: ATU 779
- Country: Germany
- Published in: Grimms' Fairy Tales

"The Ear of Corn" (German: Die Kornähre) is a German fairy tale collected by the Brothers Grimm, number 194. It is Aarne–Thompson type 779, Divine Rewards and Punishments.

== Synopsis ==
Corn (wheat) used to produce many more grains, but one day God saw a woman using the grain to clean off her muddy son. Angry, he cursed them to have no more grain, since they were not worthy of it. Bystanders pleaded with him to have mercy, especially because of the children, and he chose to have the current amount of grain.

== Title ==
Different usages have led to this tale being called "The Ear of Corn" and "The Ear of Wheat" in English.
