= The Duration of Life =

German fairy tale

Folk tale
- Name: The Duration of Life
- Aarne–Thompson grouping: ATU 173; ATU 828
- Country: Germany
- Published in: Grimms' Fairy Tales

"The Duration of Life" is a German fairy tale collected by the Brothers Grimm in Grimm's Fairy Tales, number 176. It was first included in their fourth edition.

In the Aarne-Thompson classification system, it is classified as both Types 173 and 828, Men, Animals, and the Span of Life.

== Synopsis ==
God was giving the animals and man their duration of life and offered all thirty years. He lessened the donkey's years because of his burdens, the dog's because he had to run about, and the monkey's because he always had to amuse people. Man, however, wanted more years, and so God gave him the years from the others. For this reason, a man is a man only for his first thirty years; he carries burdens like donkey, then must sit in the corner like the dog, and then becomes silly and simple like the monkey.

== Motifs ==
This fairy tale recounts a progression through life with a pessimistic outcome similar to that in William Shakespeare's stage of life speech from As You Like It.
