= The Maid of Brakel =

German fairy tale

Folk tale
- Name: The Maid of Brakel
- Aarne–Thompson grouping: 1476A
- Country: Germany
- Published in: Grimms' Fairy Tales

"The Maid of Brakel" is a German fairy tale collected by the Brothers Grimm in Grimms' Fairy Tales, tale number 115.

It is Aarne-Thompson type 1476A, Praying to the Statue's Mother.

The story is set in Brakel, Germany.

== Synopsis ==
A chapel held a statue of Saint Anne and the Virgin Mary as a child. An unmarried woman prayed to Saint Anne that she might wed a man. A clerk, who heard her, said she would not have him. The woman took it to be the child Mary and scolded her, because she was talking to her mother.

== Notes ==
Saint Anne was the patron saint of unmarried women, particularly because of the legend that she had been married three times.
