= Philipp Grot Johann =

German artist

Philip Grot Johann
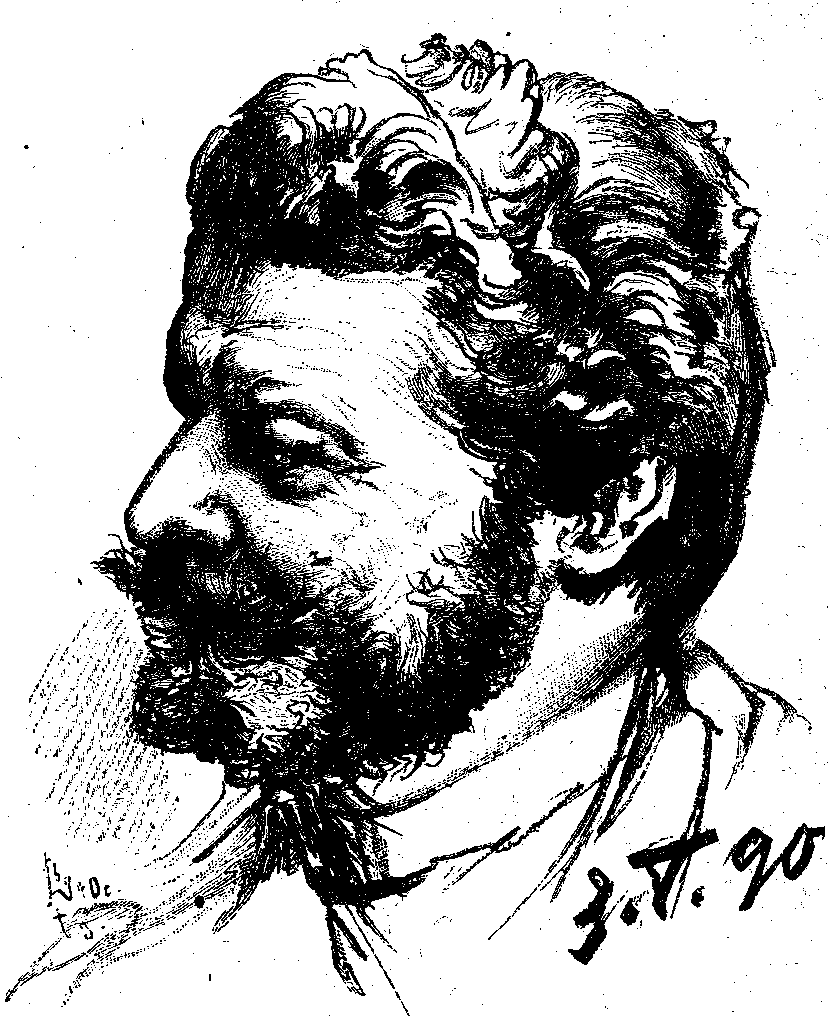
- Self-portrait
- Born: 27 June 1841; Stettin (Szczecin)
- Died: 26 October 1892 (aged 51); Düsseldorf
- Known for: Illustration, watercolor painting

Philipp Grot Johann (also Philipp Grotjohann) (27 June 1841 in Stettin (Szczecin) – 26 October 1892 in Düsseldorf) was one of the most prominent German illustrators of his time. He illustrated numerous editions of world-class literature but is probably best known for his illustrations of Grimm's Fairy Tales.

== Career and works ==
Grot Johann initially pursued a career in engineering; he spent his apprenticeship at AG Vulcan Stettin where he continued to work as a journeyman. In 1861 he took up studies in engineering at the Polytechnikum in Hannover where he discovered his vocation for artistry. Among his first works were illustrations of old German writings at Wartburg castle.

With the support of Peter von Cornelius, he moved to Düsseldorf in 1862 and studied first under Karl Ferdinand Sohn, then under Carl Johann Lasch. With the exception of the year 1867 which he spent in Antwerp, Grot Johann remained in Düsseldorf for the rest of his life. He provided the graphics for opulent editions of the works of Johann Wolfgang von Goethe and Friedrich Schiller that were published by the Grot'sche Verlagsbuchhandlung in Berlin, and also for works by William Shakespeare and Walter Scott.

In spite of these prestigious commissions, and his extensive more commercially oriented work in graphic design, Grot Johann considered his illustrations of Grimm's Fairy Tales a central part of his opus. Some of these illustrations are mildly humorous, such as the one in The Devil With the Three Golden Hairs where the devil is pictured reading a newspaper which, on closer examination, is a stock market letter. When death claimed him at only 51 years, Anton Robert Leinweber succeeded him as an illustrator for the later editions of Grimm's Fairy Tales.

Grot Johann's major works outside the illustration business include the stained glass images from the Old and New Testament in St. Peter's church at Leipzig (1884–1886; together with Eduard von Gebhardt and Carl Hertel).

== Sources ==
- Grotjohann, Philipp. Brockhaus' Konversations-Lexikon. 14th ed., Leipzig, Berlin and Vienna 1894; Vol. 8, p. 480
- Grimm's Märchen. Jubilee Edition, ca. 1900. p. XIII-VIV
