= The Hare's Bride =

German fairy tale

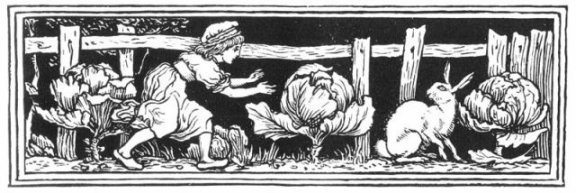
- The hare in the cabbage plot, by Walter Crane, c. 1890

Folk tale
- Name: The Hare's Bride
- Aarne–Thompson grouping: ATU 311
- Country: Germany
- Published in: Grimms' Fairy Tales

"The Hare's Bride" (German: Häsichenbraut; KHM 66) is a German fairy tale collected by the Brothers Grimm and published in the second edition of Kinder- und Hausmärchen (Grimm's Fairy Tales) in 1819. It is a tale of Aarne–Thompson type 311.

== Story ==
Once there was a woman and her daughter who lived together in a pretty little house and whose pretty little garden had a plot full of cabbages. A hare managed to get into the plot and throughout the Winter months he slowly and quietly ate the cabbages. At last, the mother told her daughter to go into the cabbage plot and chase the hare off. The girl found the hare and said, "Hare, you must go for you are eating all our cabbages!" The hare turned to the girl and said, "Sit on my little hare's tail and come with me to my little hare's hut." But the girl refused to go with him.

The next day the hare returned and again began to eat their cabbages, so the woman said to her daughter, "Go to the cabbage plot and chase that hare away."

Finding the hare, again the girl cried, "Hare, you must go for you are eating all our cabbages!"

But again the hare's response was, "Sit on my little hare's tail and come with me to my little hare's hut." And again the girl refused.

When on the third day the hare once again came and was eating the cabbages in the plot the mother told the girl, "Go to the cabbage plot and chase that hare away."

So yet again the young girl went to the cabbage plot and finding the hare eating the cabbages cried, "Hare, you must go for you are eating all our cabbages!"

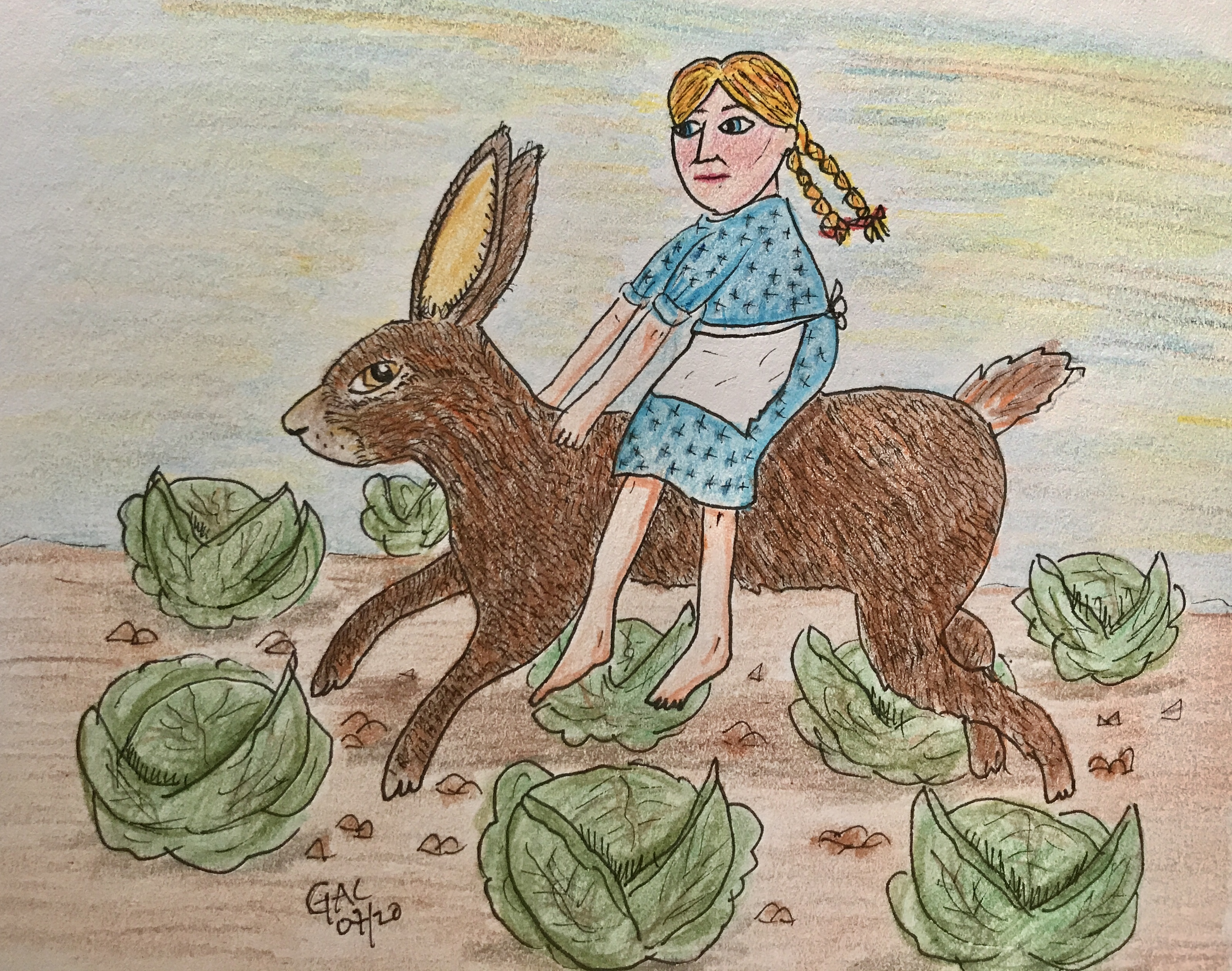
And the girl sat on the hare's tail and went to his little hut

But again the hare's response was, "Sit on my little hare's tail and come with me to my little hare's hut." And this time the girl did just that. She sat on the hare's little tail and the hare carried her off to his little hut a long way from her home. In the hut the hare said to the girl, "Here is a pot. Prepare some cabbage and millet - for today we will be married. Now I am going to fetch the guests for our wedding." Shortly after the hare returned with his wedding guests - who were all hares too. There was a crow who acted as the parson and a fox who acted as the sexton and the wedding table was placed beneath a rainbow. But the girl was unhappy for she was alone in the hut and far from home and she locked the door of the little hut.

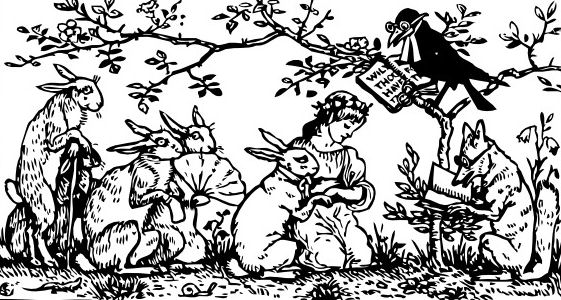
The wedding in The Hare's Bride, by Walter Crane

The hare came to the door of the hut and cried, "Open the door for the wedding guests are making merry!" But the young girl cried in her unhappiness and did not open the door and the hare went away.

On his return the hare cried, "Take off the pot's lid for the wedding guests are hungry!" But the girl still did not open the door and continued to cry in her loneliness, and again the hare went away.

The hare returned for the third time and cried, "Take off the pot's lid for the wedding guests are waiting!" Again she was silent and again she did not open the door, and the hare went away. And taking a straw doll the girl dressed it in her clothes and put a wooden spoon in its hand and placed it beside the millet pot. Then the girl ran all the way home.

When the hare came home to his little hut he cried, "Take off the pot's lid!" But on finding the door unlocked he went into the hut and in his anger he hit the straw doll on the head - when its cap fell off. Realising the doll was not his bride and that the girl had run away from him the hare sadly walked away.

== Analysis ==
The Brothers Grimm were told the fairy tale by an unnamed source, who was probably Hans Rudolf von Schröder from Buckow in Mecklenburg.

In common with many fairy tales, in this tale humans and animals are able to communicate with each other. The reason why the girl gives in and goes with the hare to his little hut is unclear: has she been tricked into going or does the girl think that the only way she can stop the hare from eating the cabbages is by agreeing to marry him? Humans marrying animals or marrying humans turned into animal-like creatures through sorcery or other means is a common theme in folklore and fairy tales, with famous examples including Beauty and the Beast, The Frog Prince and The Little Mermaid.
