= Old Hildebrand =

Austrian fairy tale

Folk tale
- Name: Old Hildebrand
- Aarne–Thompson grouping: ATU 1360C
- Country: Austria
- Published in: Grimm's Fairy Tales

"Old Hildebrand" (German: Der alte Hildebrand) is an Austrian fairy tale collected by the Brothers Grimm in Grimm's Fairy Tales (KHM 95) and written in an Austrian dialect. It is Aarne-Thompson type 1360C.

== Origin ==
The tale was published by the Brothers Grimm in the second edition of Kinder- und Hausmärchen in 1819. Their source was an unnamed informant from Austria.

== Synopsis ==
A peasant's wife and the parson fancied each other, so the wife feigned illness, and the parson preached that whoever had an ill family member could go to the Cuckoo's Mountain in Italy, and get laurel leaves that would cure the ill person. The peasant, Hildebrand, left to get them, and the parson came to his house. But on the way, Hildebrand met his cousin, an egg merchant, who alerted him and brought him to the house in his cart. The parson and the wife began to sing, the merchant sang, and Hildebrand sang that it was enough. He jumped from the basket and beat the parson out of the house.
