= The Old Man and his Grandson =

German fairy tale

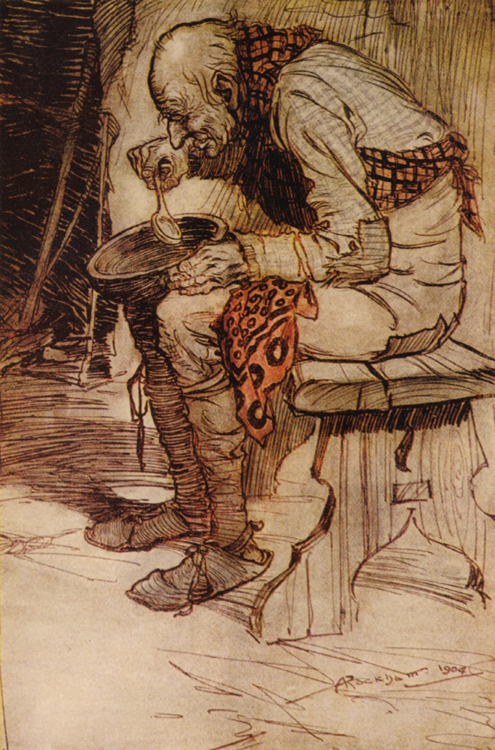
- The Old Man (grandson not present)

Folk tale
- Name: The Old Man and his Grandson
- Aarne–Thompson grouping: ATU 980B
- Country: Germany
- Published in: Grimms' Fairy Tales

"The Old Man and his Grandson" is a German fairy tale collected by the Brothers Grimm in Grimm's Fairy Tales as tale number 78.

It is Aarne-Thompson type 980B, The Wooden Bowl.

== Synopsis ==
A man whose hands shook with the tremors of old age could not eat neatly and often spilled his soup, so his son and daughter-in-law barred him from their table and made him eat by the stove.

When he broke the fine stoneware bowl from which he had been eating, they bought him a wooden bowl that could not break. His four-year-old grandson played with wood as well and said that he was making a trough for his parents to eat from when they were old. After that, they let him eat at the table again and did not complain about the spill.

== Elements ==
The bowl was described as costing a few heller.

== Variants ==
Other tales of this type vary on the exact offense that the grandson declares he will commit and the son thereafter refrains from: making his father sleep under half a blanket in the stables, bringing back the carrier so he can carry his father to abandon him, or commit murder. In medieval Europe, the son was commonly sent for a blanket and came back with half, justifying it by saying the other half is saved for his father. In an Asian version, the father weaves a basket to throw his aged father into the river. A son says to bring back the basket so that it can be used for the father one day.
