= Anton Robert Leinweber =

German painter

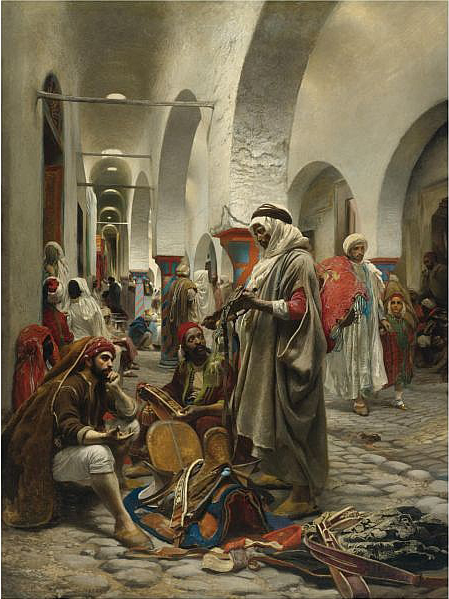
Arab Marketplace in Tunis

Anton Robert Leinweber (7 February 1845 – 21 December 1921) was a Bohemian German painter and illustrator; known for his Orientalist and Biblical scenes.

== Biography ==
He was born in Böhmisch Leipa. His father was a secondary-school teacher. After completing his local education, he went to Prague and Vienna to study engineering, but never completed his courses. While in Vienna, he became a member of the Vienna Academic Fraternity Olympia, but was expelled for unknown reasons in 1864.

After this period, he went to the Academy of Fine Arts, Munich, to study painting; followed by studies in Prague and at the Dresden Academy of Fine Arts, where his principal instructor was Julius Hübner.

He spent many years in North Africa; primarily Tunisia. Together with Philipp Grot Johann and Hermann Vogel, he created illustrations for Grimm's Fairy Tales. He also produced illustrations for a deluxe edition of the Bible. He died in 1921, in Munich.

== Sources ==
- Helge Dvorak: Biographisches Lexikon der Deutschen Burschenschaft. Vol. II: Künstler. Winter, Heidelberg 2018, ISBN 978-3-8253-6813-5, pgs.446–447
- Biographical data @ AbART
