= Looking for a Bride =

German fairy tale

Folk tale
- Name: Looking for a Bride
- Also known as: Choosing a Bride; Brides on Their Trial
- Aarne–Thompson grouping: ATU 1452
- Country: Germany
- Published in: Grimms' Fairy Tales

"Looking for a Bride" or "Choosing a Bride" or "Brides on Their Trial" is a German fairy tale collected by the Brothers Grimm in Grimm's Fairy Tales, number 155. It was first added in the second edition.

It is Aarne-Thompson type 1452, Choosing a Bride by How She Cuts Cheese.

== Synopsis ==
A shepherd could not choose which of three sisters to marry. His mother told him to give them cheese. One did not cut off all the rind and so ate some. The second cut off good cheese with the rind. The third carefully pared off the rind, and so he married her.
