= The Pack of Ragamuffins =

German fairy tale

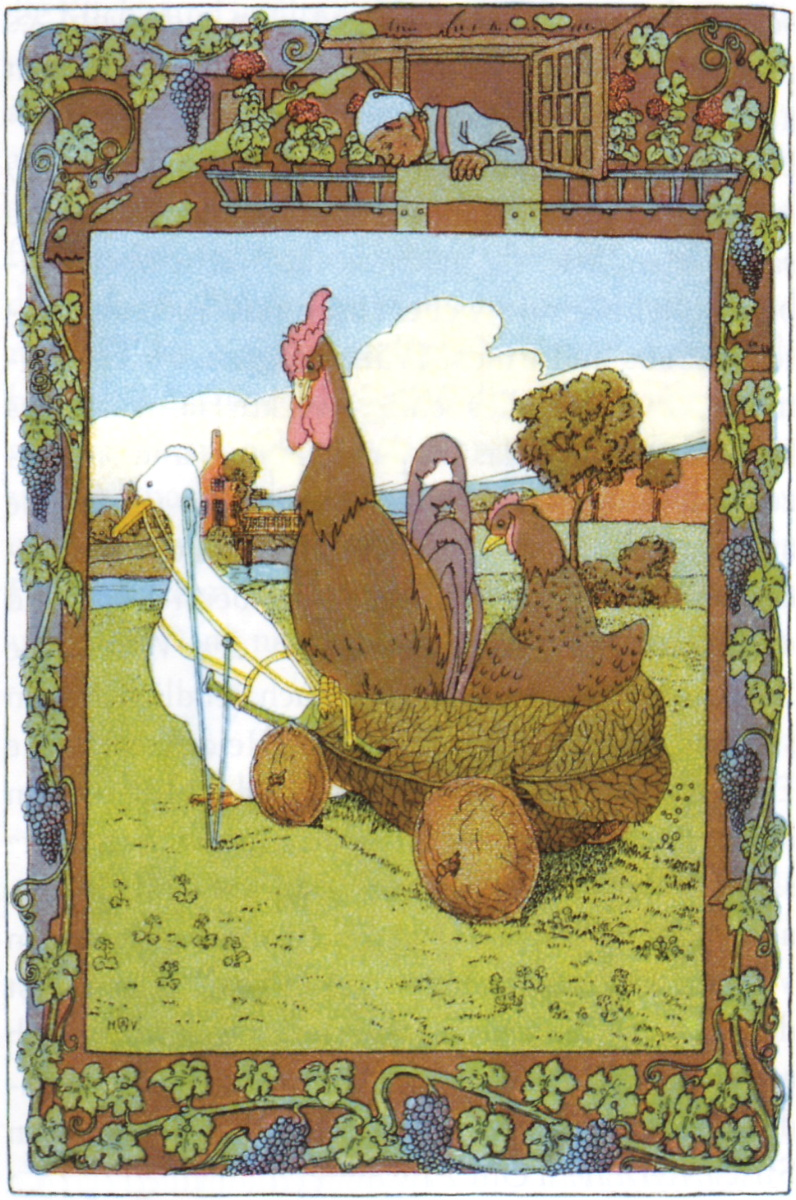
- Illustration by Heinrich Vogeler

Folk tale
- Name: The Pack of Ragamuffins
- Also known as: Das Lumpengesindel, The Adventures of Chanticleer and Partlet: How They Went to the Mountains to Eat Nuts, The Pack of Ragamuffins, The Vulgar Crew, A Pack of No-goods, Riffraff, The Pack of Scoundrels
- Aarne–Thompson grouping: ATU 210 (The Traveling Animals and the Wicked Man)
- Country: Germany
- Published in: Grimms' Fairy Tales

"The Pack of Ragamuffins" (German: Das Lumpengesindel) is a German fairy tale collected by the Brothers Grimm, number 10. The title has been variously translated into English, as in "The Adventures of Chanticleer and Partlet: How They Went to the Mountains to Eat Nuts", "The Pack of Ragamuffins", "The Vulgar Crew", "A Pack of No-goods", "Riffraff", "The Pack of Scoundrels", "The Good-For-Nothings", and possibly others.

It is Aarne-Thompson type 210, The Traveling Animals and the Wicked Man. Another tale of this type is the Grimms' "Herr Korbes". The Grimms also compared it to "The Town Musicians of Bremen".

== Synopsis ==
Illustration by Carl Offterdinger

A rooster and hen go to eat nuts. They make a carriage of nutshells to come back in; the hen rides and the rooster draws it. The duck attacks them for eating nuts, but the rooster defeats him, and he lets himself be harnessed to the carriage instead. A pin and needle join them. They offer an innkeeper the hen's egg and the duck to let them stay, but in the morning, they eat the hen's egg, stick the needle in the innkeeper's chair and the pin in his towel. The duck also goes off. The innkeeper is pricked by both the needle and pin and the eggshell from the hen flies at his eyes. He resolves to never have such ragamuffins in his inn again.
