= Clever Elsie =

German fairy tale

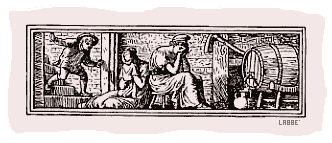
- Illustration of the Brothers Grimm fairy tale "Clever Elsie"

Folk tale
- Name: Clever Elsie
- Aarne–Thompson grouping: 1450
- Country: Germany
- Published in: Grimms' Fairy Tales

"Clever Elsie" is a German fairy tale by the Brothers Grimm. In the original 1812 edition, story #32 was called Hanses Trine. It was removed after the first edition and replaced by Die Kluge Elise in the 2nd edition.

== Plot ==
Clever Elsie, as her parents call her, is to be married. When a suitor named Hans comes to visit, Elsie goes down to the cellar to get some beer. There she spots a pickaxe stuck in the wall above the beer keg; she imagines that if she married Hans and started a family, that pickaxe could fall and kill their child. Because of this impending misfortune, Elsie begins to cry loudly in the basement. One at a time, the maid, the manservant, and the mother are sent to look for Elsie, until finally the father goes himself. When they find Elsie and discover the reason she is crying, they too begin to cry. In the end, Hans also goes into the cellar, hears about the possible misfortune and decides to marry Clever Elsie, saying, "more sense is not necessary for my household."

In the second part of the story, Hans and Elsie have been married for a while. Hans works to earn money while Elsie stays home to cut the corn. She cooks porridge, takes it to the field, eats it before she even starts to work, and then falls asleep. When Hans comes home, he at first assumes that Elsie is still hard at work, and he praises her diligence. However, when he finds her sleeping in the corn, he hangs a bird's yarn around her with small bells, goes home, and locks the front door. When Elsie wakes up in the dark and notices the clothes with bells, she no longer recognizes herself. She goes home and asks at the door if Elsie is inside. When she hears "yes," she runs away, crying, "Oh God, then it's not me." She is never seen again.

== See also ==
- Clever Gretel
