= The Owl (fairy tale) =

German fairy tale

Folk tale
- Name: The Owl
- Aarne–Thompson grouping: ATU 1281
- Country: Germany
- Published in: Grimms' Fairy Tales

"The Owl" is a German fairy tale collected by the Brothers Grimm in Grimm's Fairy Tales, number 174.

It is Aarne-Thompson type 1281, Burning the Barn to Destroy an Unknown Animal.

== Synopsis ==
In the story, a horned owl flies into a barn owned by a local at the nearby town. The owl quickly frightens all of the townspeople who try to enter the barn. The same day, a man known for his courage and bravery in warlike skills announces to the populace that they are "all acting like women". He then ventures into the barn with a spear. The owl hoots at him, and he flees in terror. The townspeople finally come up with the decision to burn the barn down and be rid of the owl forever.
