= A Riddling Tale =

German fairy tale

Folk tale
- Name: A Riddling Tale
- Aarne–Thompson grouping: 407
- Country: Germany
- Published in: Grimms' Fairy Tales

"A Riddling Tale" is a type of German fairy tale collected by the Brothers Grimm in Grimm's Fairy Tales. In German, a "riddling tale" is called "Rätsel-Märchen".

A common example is Aarne-Thompson type 407, the girl as a flower. The tale portion of it is subordinate to the riddle, and the tale is not widely found in the oral tradition.

== Synopsis ==
Three women were changed to identical flowers. One was allowed home at night and told her husband to pick and free her. He did so.

Riddle

How did he recognize her?

Answer

The other flowers, having been in the field all night, had dew on them. The wife did not. So for that, he would know that that flower was his wife.

== Additional sources ==
- Angelopoulos, Anna, Sylvette Gendre-Dusuzeau, and Agnès Jacob. "The Riddle Tale." In Greek Folktales and Psychoanalysis, ed. by Anna Angelopoulos, pp. 217-239. Routledge.
