= Mother Trudy =

German fairy tale

Folk tale
- Name: Mother Trudy
- Aarne–Thompson grouping: ATU 334 (At the Witch's House)
- Country: Germany
- Published in: Grimms' Fairy Tales

"Mother Trudy" (German: Frau Trude) is a German fairy tale collected by the Brothers Grimm, tale number 43. It is Aarne–Thompson type 334, at the witch's house.

== Plot ==
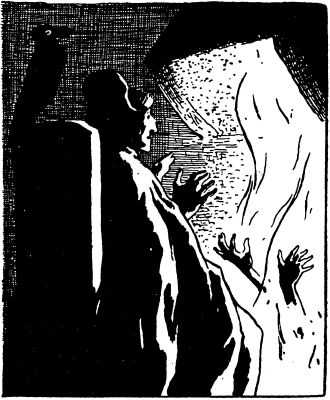

A willful little girl will not obey her parents and, having taken it into her head that she wants to see Frau Trude, goes in spite of all their warnings. She arrives terrified, and Frau Trude questions her. She tells of seeing a black man on her steps (a collier, says Frau Trude), a green man (a huntsman), a red man (a butcher), and, looking through her window, the devil instead of Frau Trude.

Frau Trude says she saw the witch in her proper attire, and that she had been waiting for the girl. She turned her into a block of wood and threw her onto the fire, and then warmed herself by it, commenting on how bright the block made the fire.

== Commentary ==
The tale is unusual in that the evil witch triumphs in the end; the child is defeated. However, a common theme in Grimm tales is that children who do not obey their parents are punished, making it a signature Grimm story.

== See also ==
- Hansel and Gretel
- Vasilisa the Beautiful
- The Willful Child
