= The Starving Children =

"The Starving Children" (German: Die Kinder in Hungersnot), is a fairy tale included in the first edition of the Grimm's Fairy Tales. It has been removed from the book since its second edition. It is related to the longer Gottes Speise that appeared in the Kinder-legende section from 1819.

== Plot summary ==
There was a mother with two daughters. They were very poor and starving. The mother was so hungry that she lost her mind and was about to kill one of her daughters for food. The daughter asked the mother not to kill her as she would go out and find them food. However, she could only find a small piece of bread. It did not last long and the mother again lost her mind and tried to kill the other daughter. This time, this daughter told her the same thing and brought home two pieces of bread. They ate the bread but it was not enough.

The mother was about to try killing her daughters again. This time, the daughters suggested they sleep until the end of the world. They slept, but no one could ever wake up, the mother disappeared and no one has seen her again.
