= The Flail from Heaven =

The Flail From Heaven

Folk tale
- Name: The Flail From Heaven
- Aarne–Thompson grouping: ATU 1889K
- Country: Germany
- Published in: Grimms' Fairy Tales

"The Flail From Heaven" (German: Der Dreschflegel vom Himmel) is a Brothers Grimm fairy tale collected by the Brothers Grimm. Since the second edition published in 1819, it has been recorded as Tale no. 112. It is Aarne–Thompson type AT 1889K, A Rope Made of Chaff.

== Synopsis ==
The tale begins with a peasant tilling his fields with a pair of oxen. Inexplicably, while in the field, the oxen's horns grew to an extraordinary size; an effect that prevented the peasant from returning home with them. Fortunately, the peasant was able to sell the oxen to a nearby butcher. The butcher, having no currency on him, bartered a measure of turnip-seed with the peasant, offering should the peasant return to him with the measure of rapeseed he would exchange a Brabant thaler for each seed. The peasant returned home with the seed, however, he lost one seed out of the bag on the way. The next day, the butcher paid him per agreement minus the one missing seed. On his way back from the butcher, the peasant passed where he dropped the seed and saw it had sprouted into a tree which reached up to the heavens. The peasant climbed the tree and, reaching the top, spied angels threshing oats. While he was viewing the angels, the tree began to shake; someone below was cutting down the tree. To save himself from being falling from the tree, the peasant wove a length of rope from the oat chaff that lay in piles. Before descending he stole a hoe and a flail which were lying in the heavenly fields. He descended the rope only to find himself at the bottom of deep pit. Using the hoe, he carved a flight of steps and walked up and out of the pit. The peasant kept the flail as proof of his adventure.

== See also ==
- Jack and the Beanstalk
