= Clever Gretel =

German fairy tale

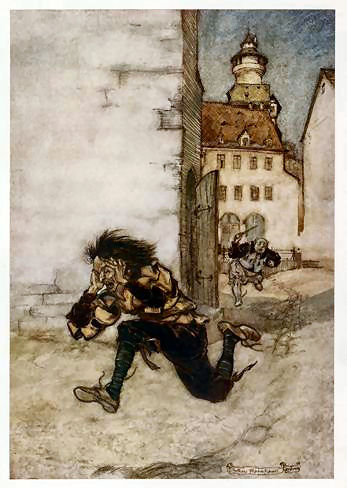
- "And he ran as fast as his legs could carry him!" - illustration by Arthur Rackham for Grimms' Fairy Tales (1900)

Folk tale
- Name: Clever Gretel
- Aarne–Thompson grouping: ATU 1741
- Country: Germany
- Published in: Grimms' Fairy Tales

"Clever Gretel" (German: Das kluge Gretel) is a German fairy tale collected by the Brothers Grimm, KHM 195. It is Aarne-Thompson type 1741 – Trickster Wives and Maids and was first published in the second edition of Grimms' Fairy Tales in 1819.

== Story ==
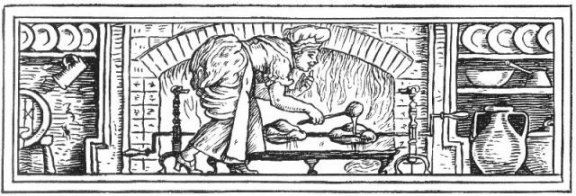
Gretel cooking the chickens - border illustration by Walter Crane c1890

There once was a cook called Gretel who wore shoes with red heels and red rosettes, and when she went out wearing them she would turn this way and that way admiringly, giving herself great airs and saying, "You really are a beautiful girl, Gretel!" And this made her happy, so when she got back to her master's house she would have a sip of wine, which would make her hungry, so she would taste whatever she had cooked for dinner until she wasn't hungry anymore and then she would say to herself, "The cook has to know how the food tastes."

One day her master said to her, "Gretel, this evening a guest is coming for dinner. Cook two chickens as well as you can."

"Yes, sir," said Gretel. And taking two chickens she killed them, and scalded the skin and plucked them, and then she roasted them as well as she could. The chickens were thoroughly cooked, but the master's guest had not arrived.

Gretel called out to her master, "Sir, the chickens are done and are perfect but if they are not eaten soon they will spoil."

Her master said, "You are right. They must not spoil. I will quickly go and fetch my guest myself." And with that he rushed out of the house.

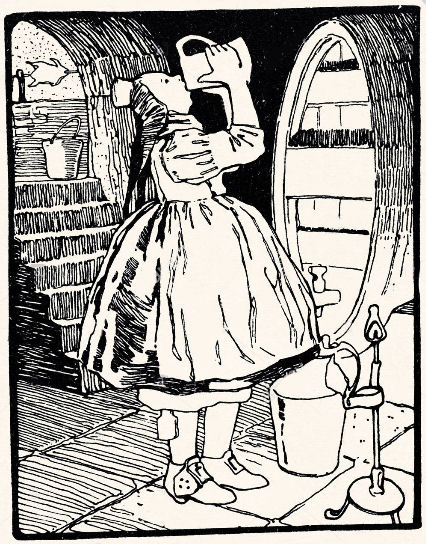
Clever Gretel takes a big swig - illustration by Walter Crane (1890)

As soon as he was gone Gretel put the chickens to one side and said to herself, "All this slaving over the oven has made me hot and thirsty. Who knows how long they will be? While I'm waiting I'll just go down into the cellar and have a little sip of wine." So down she went to the cellar where she raised the jug of wine to her lips and had a big swig, saying to herself, "God bless you, Gretel."

Then she said to herself, "Really, the wine shouldn't be separated", and she took another healthy swig. Then going back upstairs she put the chickens back in the oven and basted them with butter. The aroma from the roasted chickens was delicious, and Gretel said to herself, "They smell fine but they may not be cooked properly. I'd better taste them." And she pinched one with her fingers, which she licked. "My", she said to herself, "that chicken is perfect. I'd better check the other one too." And she did the same again. Gretel said to herself, "These chickens are perfect now, but if they aren't eaten soon they will spoil", and she ran to the window to look for her master and his guest, but they were nowhere to be seen.

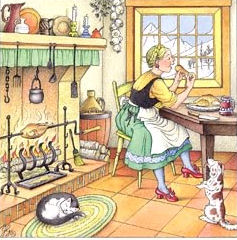
Gretel eating the chickens

Turning back to the chickens she said, "That wing is burning, so I'd better eat it," and she cut it off and ate it, and it was delicious. Then she said, "I'd better eat the other wing too, or my master will notice something is wrong." And she did just that, and it was as delicious as the other wing.

Then Gretel ran to the window to look for her master and his guest, but they were nowhere to be seen. Then she said to herself, "Perhaps they are not coming? Perhaps they have found somewhere else to eat? Well, I've already started on this one so I might as well finish it for it is wrong to refuse God's gift." And so saying, she finished the chicken and washed it down with more wine. Then Gretel turned her attention to the other chicken, and said to herself, "The two should not be separated. Where one has gone the other must follow." And she ate the second chicken, washing it down with wine, as before.

Just as she was finishing her meal she heard her master's voice calling, "Hurry, Gretel, for my guest is right behind me!"

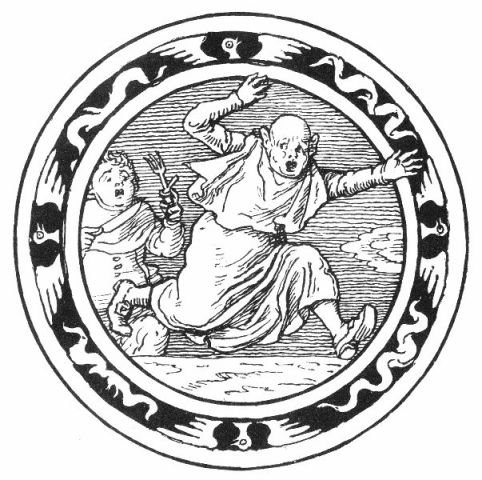
"Just one! Just one! Let me have just one!" - illustration by Walter Crane (1890)

Wiping her mouth Gretel said, "Yes, sir. The chickens are ready." Her master went into the kitchen where he picked up the large carving knife and took it to the hallway, where he began to sharpen it, ready to carve the chickens. The guest arrived and knocked on the door, which Gretel quickly opened. Holding a finger to her mouth, she whispered to her master's guest, "Shh! Shh! You must run away from here at once, for my master has tricked you into coming with this talk of dinner. Really he wants to cut off your ears. See, there he is sharpening the knife to make it ready." The guest looked past her into the hallway where he saw her master sharpening the knife and he turned and ran down the street as fast as his legs could carry him.

Then Gretel ran to her master and cried, "What sort of friends do you invite as your guest? He has seized both chickens from the platter as I was about to serve them and he has run off with them!"

"Well," said her master. "that's a fine thing, for I am very hungry. He could have left me one!" With that he ran into the street after his guest, waving the carving knife and calling out, "Just one! Just one! Let me have just one!" But the guest thought he wanted to cut off one of his ears, and he ran as if the ground beneath his feet was on fire.

== Analysis ==
Clever Gretel is a tale where a greedy but crafty servant outwits her master. It was first published in the second edition of Grimms' Fairy Tales in 1819, undergoing only slight stylistic revisions in later editions including the final edition (Berlin, 1857), listed as no. 77. The Gretel in the story is not to be confused with the character in Hansel and Gretel.

The Grimms' obtained the tale from Andreas Strobl's Ovum paschale oder neugefärbte Oster-Ayr (Salzburg, 1700, pp. 23–26] and from various other printed and oral sources. Clever Gretel is one of only two tales in the Grimms' collection that are titled after a clever female protagonist, the other being Clever Else. Both are comic stories, but only in this tale does the woman come out on top. The story plays on the fears of the employers of servants as to what those maids and cooks get up to when their backs are turned. In other stories of the clever woman type the male is the woman's husband or a priest, while in tales similar to Clever Gretel it is not the guest's ears that are at risk of being cut off but his testicles!

The tale begins by introducing Gretel as being rather different to other servants of the time, for Gretel delights in her appearance and happily twirls in her red shoes in the street before going home to drink her master's wine. The story has no moral or lesson for its audience, for Gretel is not caught and therefore does not face any consequences for her lies and her theft, and possibly for her alcoholism. In Strobl's original version Gretel is caught and ends up living a miserable existence after her master throws her out. The Grimms rewrote the tale, leaving out the moralising conclusion.

We are invited to admire Gretel's cleverness in outwitting her master; or we may feel sorry for him while his cook steals from him and loses him a friend, no doubt damaging his reputation at the same time.
