= Jorinde and Joringel =

German fairy tale

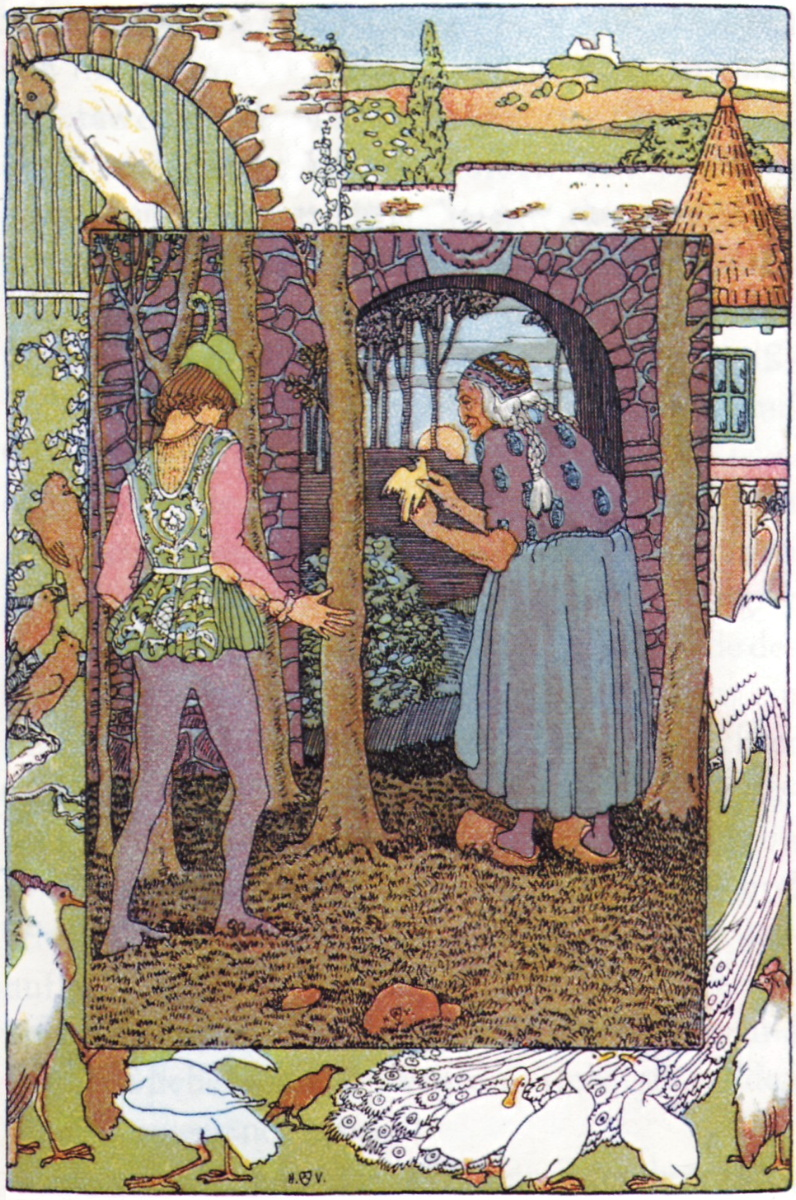
- Illustration by Heinrich Vogeler.

Folk tale
- Name: Jorinde and Joringel
- Aarne–Thompson grouping: ATU 405
- Published in: Grimm's Fairy Tales

"Jorinde and Joringel" is a German fairy tale collected by the Brothers Grimm (KHM 69). It is Aarne–Thompson 405. The tale is found virtually exclusively in Germany, barring a Swedish variant, although Marie Campbell found a variant in Kentucky, "The Flower of Dew". The story is known in many English translations as "Jorinda and Jorindel".

== Summary ==
An evil shape-shifting witch (or "fairy," depending on the translation) lived alone in a dark castle in the woods. She could lure wild animals and birds to her before killing them for food. She froze to stone any man who would dare come near where she stood, and turned innocent maidens into birds and caged them. Jorinde and Joringel, two lovers engaged to be married, went for a walk in the forest. They came too near to the witch's lair. She turned Jorinde into a nightingale and petrified Joringel to the ground. Once she had carried away the bird, she freed Joringel, laughing that he would never see Jorinde again.

One night, Joringel dreamed of a flower that would break all the witch's spells. He sought it for nine days, found it, and carried it back to the castle. He was not frozen to the ground when he approached the castle and all of the doors opened. He found the witch feeding the birds. She was unable to curse him. When she tried to take one cage away, he realized it was Jorinde. He touched the witch with the flower and her evil magic left her forever. He touched Jorinde with the flower and she became a woman again. Then he transformed all the other women back.

== Variants ==
During the nineteenth century, few variations of the tale were published, though Johannes Bolte and Jiří Polívka did record a Swedish variant. However, the situation had changed by the 20th century.

For example, a Flemish version from Willebroek titled Janneken, Mieken and the witch Peetje Loo (Janneken en Mieken en de tooverheks Peetje Loo) was collected by Victor de Meyere. In that version, the protagonists are not lovers but siblings, and the spell is broken not with a flower, but by hitting the witch with a snake's hide. In a Dutch version from Driebergen titled The Golden Ball (De gouden bal), collected by Gerrit Jacob Boekenoogen, the protagonists are also siblings as well as a prince and princess, but the brother is the one turned into a bird. In order to obtain the magical white flower and break the spell, the princess must defeat a dragon with the help of dwarfs.

There is also the more well-known English tale "Hansel and Gretel", which has a similar premise.

Outside Europe, Marie Campbell collected a version from the Appalachian Mountains titled The Flower of Dew, that follows the plot from the Grimm's tale pretty closely.

== Alternate names ==
In English compilations, the tale was sometimes translated as Florinda and Yoringal or as Florinda and Florindel.

== In popular culture ==
- Jorinde and Joringel is featured in Grimm's Fairy Tale Classics as part of its "Grimm Masterpiece Theater" season.
- Characters named Jorinde and Joringel are featured in the adventure game "Anna's Quest".

== See also ==
- "The Old Woman in the Wood"
