= The Dog and the Sparrow =

German fairy tale

Folk tale
- Name: The Dog and the Sparrow
- Also known as: Der Hund und der Sperling
- Aarne–Thompson grouping: ATU 248 (The Man, the Dog, and the Bird)
- Region: Germany
- Published in: Kinder- und Hausmärchen, by the Brothers Grimm

"The Dog and the Sparrow" (German: Der Hund und der Sperling) is a German fairy tale collected by the Brothers Grimm (KHM 58). It is a story of Aarne-Thompson type 248 ("The Man, the Dog, and the Bird").

== Origin ==
According to the Grimms, the story was "told with variations in Zwehrn, Hesse and Göttingen."

== Synopsis ==
A dog owner lets his shepherd dog starve from hunger, causing it to leave home. The dog meets a sparrow and accompanies it to the city. The bird captures meat and bread for the dog as a sign of gratitude. When they leave town, night falls, and they decide to go to sleep. During the night, a man in a horse carriage approaches the dog and sparrow. The sparrow alerts the man that he is going to run over the dog who is in the road, but he ignores the sparrow and runs over the dog nevertheless. The sparrow curses the man, announcing that he will turn into a poor man. It pecks the wine barrels the man was transporting open, so that the precious wine leaks out. The bird also pecks out the horses' eyes. When the man tries to kill the bird with an axe, he accidentally slays his own horses down. As a result, the man is forced to leave his now useless carriage behind and returns home.

At home he notices that birds have eaten all his wheat. He notices the sparrow, still out on revenge, and throws his axe at him, only to smash his own windows, his stove and the rest of his household. Finally he manages to capture the bird, and his wife asks him whether he is going to strike it dead. The man feels this death is not cruel enough for the bird. He swallows it in one big bite. However, the bird still sticks its head out of the man's mouth, prompting him to let his wife take a final swing with his axe at the bird. This kills the man and the bird flies off.
