= The Hut in the Forest =

German fairy tale

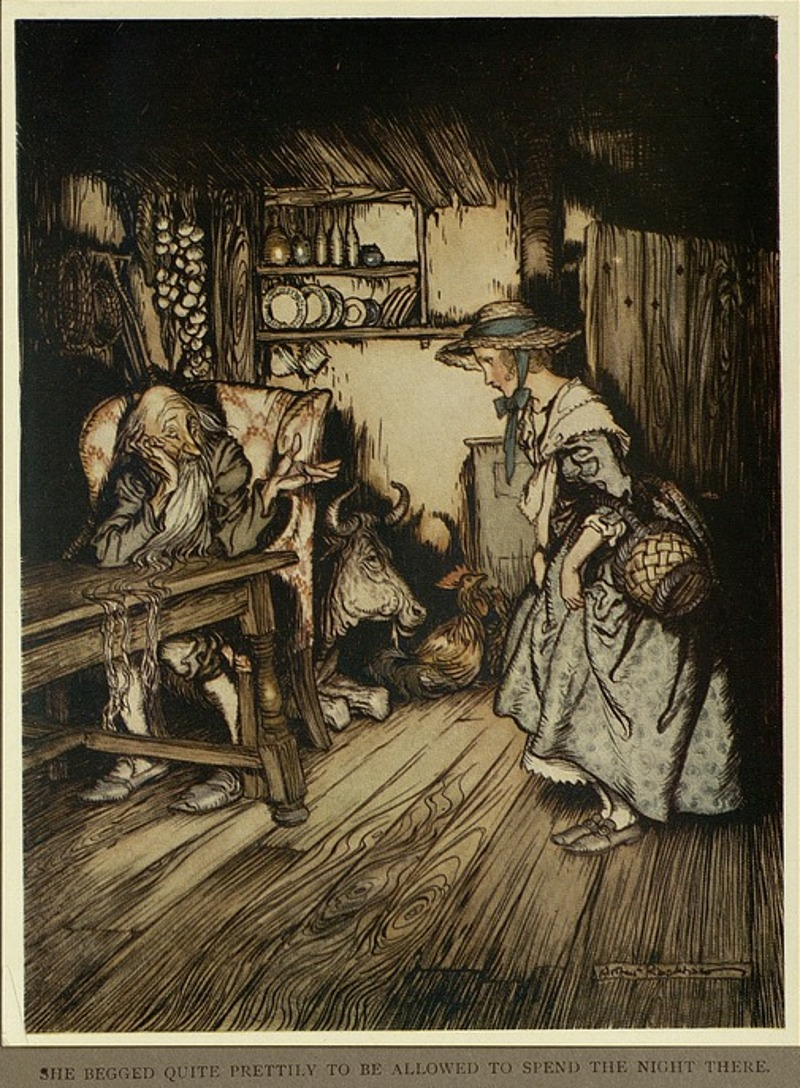
- Arthur Rackham, 1917.

Folk tale
- Name: The Hut in the Forest
- Also known as: The Hut in the Wood
- Aarne–Thompson grouping: ATU 431
- Country: Germany
- Published in: Grimm's Fairy Tales

"The Hut in the Forest" (also "The Hut in the Wood"; German: Das Waldhaus) is a German fairy tale collected by the Brothers Grimm (KHM 169). Andrew Lang included it in The Pink Fairy Book (1897). It is Aarne-Thompson type 431.

== Synopsis ==
A wood-cutter told his wife to have his oldest daughter bring him his dinner in the woods. She lost her way and in the night found a house with a gray-haired man and a hen, a cock, and a brindled cow. She asked for shelter. The man asked the animals, the animals said "Duks", and the man agreed, and told her to cook dinner. She cooked for him and herself, and asked for a bed. He directed her to an upper room, where she went to sleep. The old man followed her and opened a trapdoor that let her down into the cellar as her punishment. The next day, the same thing happened with the second daughter.

On the third day, the youngest ended up in the hut. She pet the animals, and when she had made supper for herself and the old man, also got barley for the birds and hay for the cow. She went upstairs to sleep, but at midnight, a sound like the house tearing apart woke her. Still, it stopped, and she went back to sleep In the morning, she found herself in a palace with a king's son, enchanted with three attendants. The king's son had been bewitched by an evil fairy to remain there as an old man until the arrival of a woman who is very kind to people and animals. He summoned her parents to the wedding, and made her sisters servants to a charcoal burner, until they learned not to leave poor animals to suffer hunger.

== Analysis ==
The tale is classified in the Aarne-Thompson-Uther Index as type ATU 431, "The House in the Forest". In this type of enchanted husband narrative, the old man is actually a prince, and his three animals are his three servants. This type may also appear combined with tale type ATU 480, "The Kind and Unkind Girls".

Tale type 431 is also found in Turkey, where the "House in the Woods" becomes a "House of Cats".

== See also ==
- Beauty and the Beast
- The Old Woman in the Wood
