= The Three Apprentices =

German fairy tale

Folk tale
- Name: The Three Apprentices
- Also known as: The Three Journeymen
- Aarne–Thompson grouping: ATU 360
- Country: Germany
- Published in: Grimms' Fairy Tales

"The Three Apprentices" or "The Three Journeymen" (German: Die drei Handwerksburschen) is a German fairy tale collected by the Brothers Grimm in Grimm's Fairy Tales as tale number 120.

It is Aarne-Thompson type 360, The Three Apprentices and the Devil.

== Synopsis ==
Three apprentices banded together and agreed to work in the same town, but they had grown so poor that they thought they had to separate. A richly dressed man asked them to help him for money. One noticed that he had a horse's foot, but though he was the Devil, he assured them that he only wanted a soul that was already half his and not theirs. He gave them money and told them that, whenever they were spoken to, the first one was to say "All three of us"; the second, "For money"; and the third, "And quite right too!"

They went and lived in an inn. The innkeeper thought they were mad, and they saw everything that happened there. A merchant gave the innkeeper money to take care of, for fear the apprentices would steal it. The innkeeper murdered the merchant in the night and blamed the apprentices; their answers to the questions seemed confessions of guilt, but the Devil appeared as they were about to be executed and freed them. They then announced that the innkeeper was the murderer, and where the bodies were to be found. The innkeeper was executed, the Devil got his soul, and the three apprentices had money for the rest of their lives.
