= Clever Hans (fairy tale) =

German fairy tale

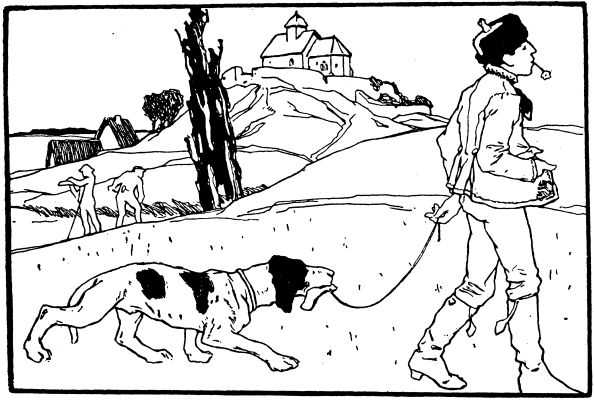
- Illustration by Otto Ubbelohde to the fairy tale Clever Hans

Folk tale
- Name: Clever Hans
- Also known as: Der gescheite Hans
- Aarne–Thompson grouping: 1685 and 1696
- Country: Germany
- Published in: Grimms' Fairy Tales

"Clever Hans" (German: Der gescheite Hans) is a fairy tale collected by the Brothers Grimm (KHM 32) about a boy who ruins his engagement with a girl through a variety of comedic events. The title is claimed by most people to be ironic. It is Aarne-Thompson type 1685 and 1696.

== Plot summary ==
A boy named Hans has a conversation with his mother every morning (in the morning conversations he simply is telling her he is going to meet his fiancée Gretel) and evening (in which his mother reprimands him for mishandling a gift from his fiancée). Every morning when Hans meets Gretel she asks him what he brought for her. Hans answers that he did not bring anything, but he asks her for a gift. In order, she gives him:

- a needle
- a knife
- a young goat
- a ham
- a calf
- herself

In each instance, Hans mishandles the gifts. He sticks the needle in some hay but his mother tells him he should have stuck it through his sleeve. So he puts the knife in his sleeve but is told he should have put it in his pocket. He puts the goat in his pocket, thus smothering it, and is told he should have led it by a rope. He tries to lead the ham by a rope, and dogs steal it, his mother telling him he should have carried it on his head (or, in some versions, under his arm). He carries the calf this way but it kicks him until he drops it and it runs away. He is told he should have tied it in the stable. He ties Gretel in the stable and the story ends when he misunderstands his mother's advice ("Cast your adoring eyes at her") and gouges out the eyes of the livestock he owns to throw at Gretel.

The result is a disengagement, portrayed in the final sentence: "And that's how Hans lost his bride."
