= The Willful Child =

German fairy tale

Folk tale
- Name: The Willful Child
- Aarne–Thompson grouping: ATU 779
- Country: Germany
- Published in: Grimms' Fairy Tales

"The Willful Child" (German: Das eigensinnige Kind) is a German fairy tale collected by the Brothers Grimm as tale number 117. As a legend, it is widely distributed in Germany.

It is Aarne-Thompson type 779, divine rewards and punishments. Other tales of this type are The Star Money and Frau Trude.

== Synopsis ==
Once upon a time there was a child who was willful and would not do what her mother wished. For this reason, God had no pleasure in her, and let her become ill. No doctor could do her any good, and in a short time, the child lay on her deathbed. When she had been lowered into her grave, and the earth was spread over her, all at once her little arm came out again and reached upward. And when they had pushed it back in the ground and spread fresh earth over it, it was all to no purpose, for the arm always came out again. Then the mother herself was obliged to go to the grave and strike the arm with a rod. When she had done that, the arm was drawn in, and at last, the child had to rest beneath the ground. And everything went back to normal.

== Commentary ==
In their first edition, the girl merely became ill; that God allows her to fall ill was added in later ones.

The original German text uses a neuter noun, das Kind, for the child; the gender of the child cannot be determined.

== See also ==
- Frau Trude
