= The Hurds =

German fairy tale

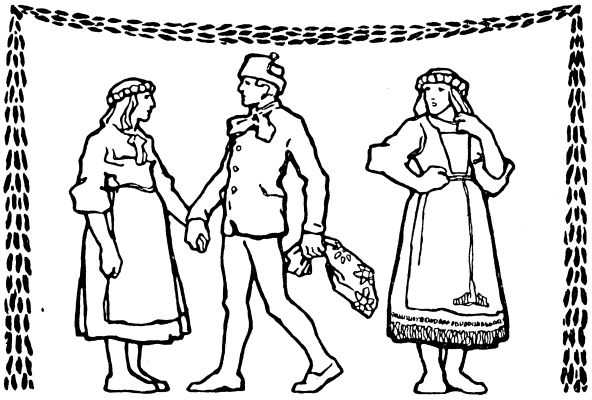

Folk tale
- Name: The Hurds
- Also known as: Odds and Ends
- Aarne–Thompson grouping: ATU 1451
- Country: Germany
- Published in: Grimms' Fairy Tales

"The Hurds" or "Odds and Ends" is a German fairy tale collected by the Brothers Grimm, who included it in their collection (Grimm's Fairy Tales) as Die Schlickerlinge.

The Grimms noted they collected the tale in the Mecklenburg region. It is Aarne-Thompson type 1451, a suitor chooses the thrifty girl.

== Synopsis ==
A lazy girl tore out handfuls of flax when she found a knot while spinning. Her industrious servant gathered them and made a gown. The lazy girl was to marry, but when the servant was gaily dancing in her gown at a party on the eve of the wedding, the bride told her bridegroom carelessly about the origin of that gown: it was made of "hurds" or "odds and ends" she threw away – and the bridegroom married the servant instead.
