= The Tailor in Heaven =

German fairy tale

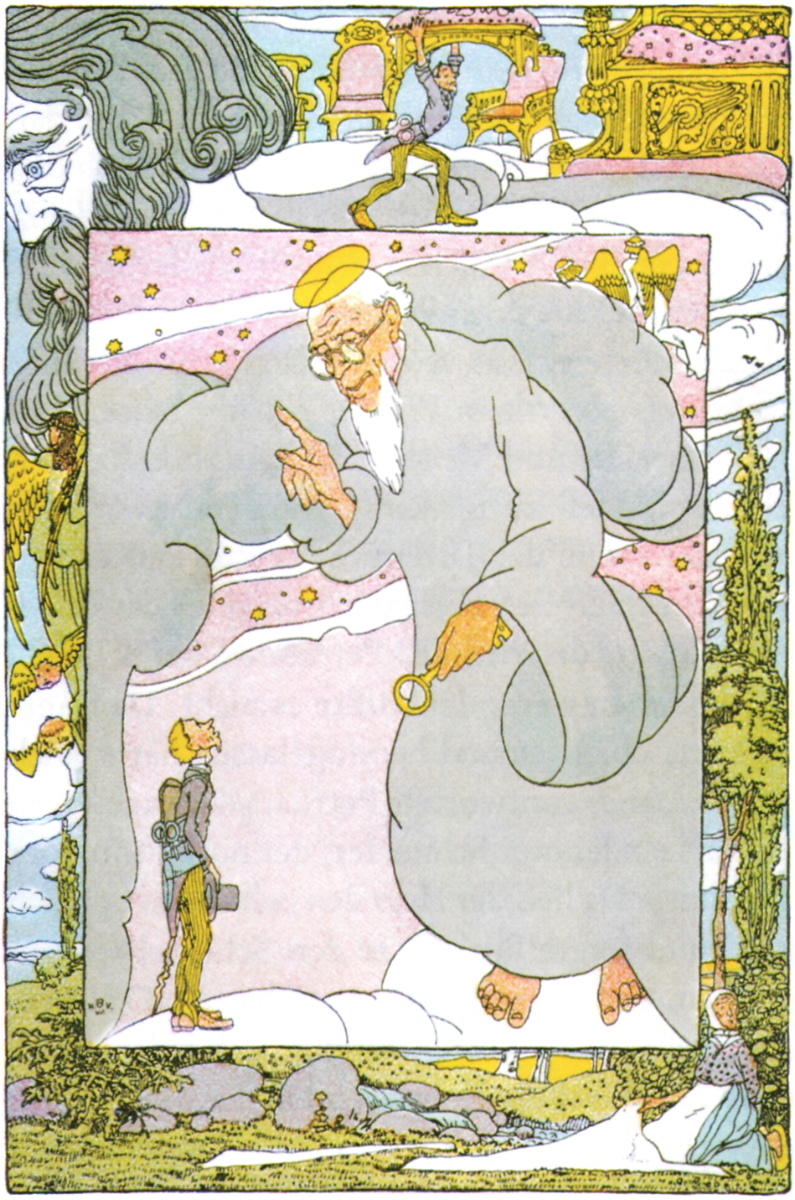
- Illustration by Heinrich Vogeler

Folk tale
- Name: The Tailor in Heaven
- Aarne–Thompson grouping: ATU 800
- Country: Germany
- Published in: Grimms' Fairy Tales

"The Tailor in Heaven" is a German fairy tale collected by the Brothers Grimm, tale number 35.

It is Aarne-Thompson type 800.

== Synopsis ==
God went to walk in the heavenly garden and took everyone except St. Peter. A tailor arrived at the gate. St. Peter refused to admit him, because he had stolen clothing and because God had forbidden him to admit anyone. The tailor begged, and St. Peter let him sit in the corner to await God. The tailor wandered off and found the chair where God could see everything on earth. He sat and saw an old woman steal two veils while doing laundry. He threw a golden stool at her. God returned, said that if he was that merciless, Heaven would be bare because he would have thrown everything at the earth, and threw the tailor out.
