= The Shroud (fairy tale) =

German fairy tale

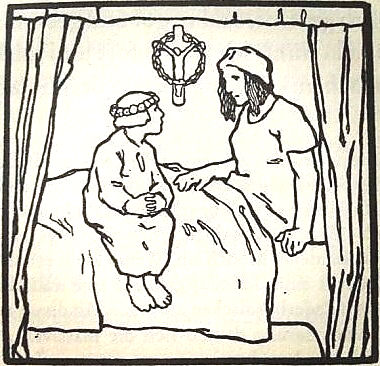
- "Look, mother, my shroud is nearly dry" - illustration by Otto Ubbelohde (c1893)

Folk tale
- Name: The Shroud
- Also known as: The Burial Shirt; The Little Shroud
- Aarne–Thompson grouping: ATU 769
- Country: Germany
- Published in: Grimms' Fairy Tales

"The Shroud" (German: Das Totenhemdchen; KHM 109), also known as "The Burial Shirt" and "The Little Shroud", is a German fairy tale collected by the Brothers Grimm and published in the first edition of Kinder- und Hausmärchen (Grimm's Fairy Tales) in 1815. It contains elements of Aarne–Thompson type 769: The Death of a Child.

== Story ==
The tale was translated by Margaret Raine Hunt in 1884:

There was once a mother who had a little seven-year-old boy. He was so handsome and lovable that no one could look at him without liking him, and she worshipped him above everything else in the world.

He suddenly became ill, and God took him to himself. His mother could not be comforted, and wept day and night. Soon afterwards, after her son had been buried, he appeared at night in the places where he had sat and played during his life, and if the mother wept, he wept also. When morning came, he disappeared.

When the mother would not stop crying, he came one night in the little white shroud in which he had been laid in his coffin, and with his wreath of flowers round his head. He stood on the bed at her feet, and said, "Oh, mother, do stop crying, or I shall never fall asleep in my coffin, for my shroud will not dry because of all thy tears, which fall upon it." The mother was afraid when she heard that, and wept no more. The next night the child came again, and held a little light in his hand, and said, "Look, mother, my shroud is nearly dry, and I can rest in my grave.” Then the mother gave her sorrow into God's keeping, and bore it quietly and patiently, and the child came no more, but slept in his little bed beneath the earth.

== Analysis ==
The Shroud was originally No. 23 in Volume 2 of the 1st edition (1815). It had only a few minor alterations between 1815 and the final edition (1857). It has been No. 109 in the order since the second edition of 1819.

In a time of high mortality rates among children, through the story we are taught that just as the distraught mother learns to put her trust in God and control her grieving so too must we when we suffer a death otherwise the spirit of the departed cannot rest. In the end both characters find peace.
