= Herr Korbes =

German fairy tale

"Herr Korbes" (German for "Mr. Korbes") is a German fairy tale collected by the Brothers Grimm, number 41. They found it in both the district of the Main (from Jeanette Hassenpflug) and Hesse (from Lisette Wild).

It is Aarne-Thompson type 210, The Traveling Animals and the Wicked Man. Another tale of this type is the Grimms' The Pack of Ragamuffins.

== Synopsis ==
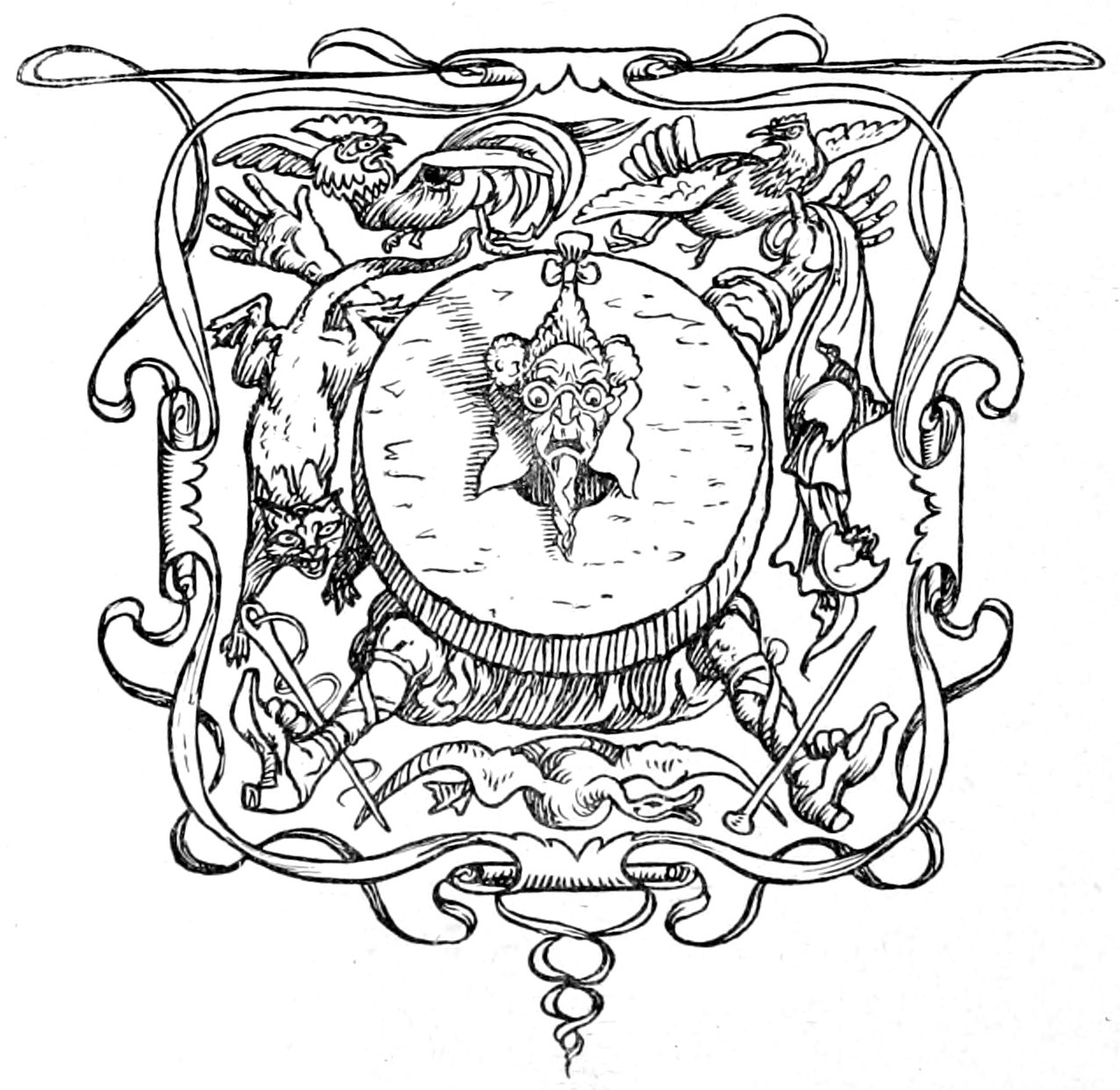
Endpiece to Mr. Korbes by Walter Crane, 1882

A cock and a hen go to Herr Korbes's house in a carriage drawn by mice. Along the way, they pick up a cat, millstone, an egg, a duck, a pin, and a needle. Herr Korbes is not at home; they go in and when he returns, they attack and kill him.

== Variants ==
In their third edition, the Grimms added a sentence to the end, that Korbes must have been a wicked man.
