= The Mouse, the Bird, and the Sausage =

Fairytale involving false accusations of espionage against a sausage

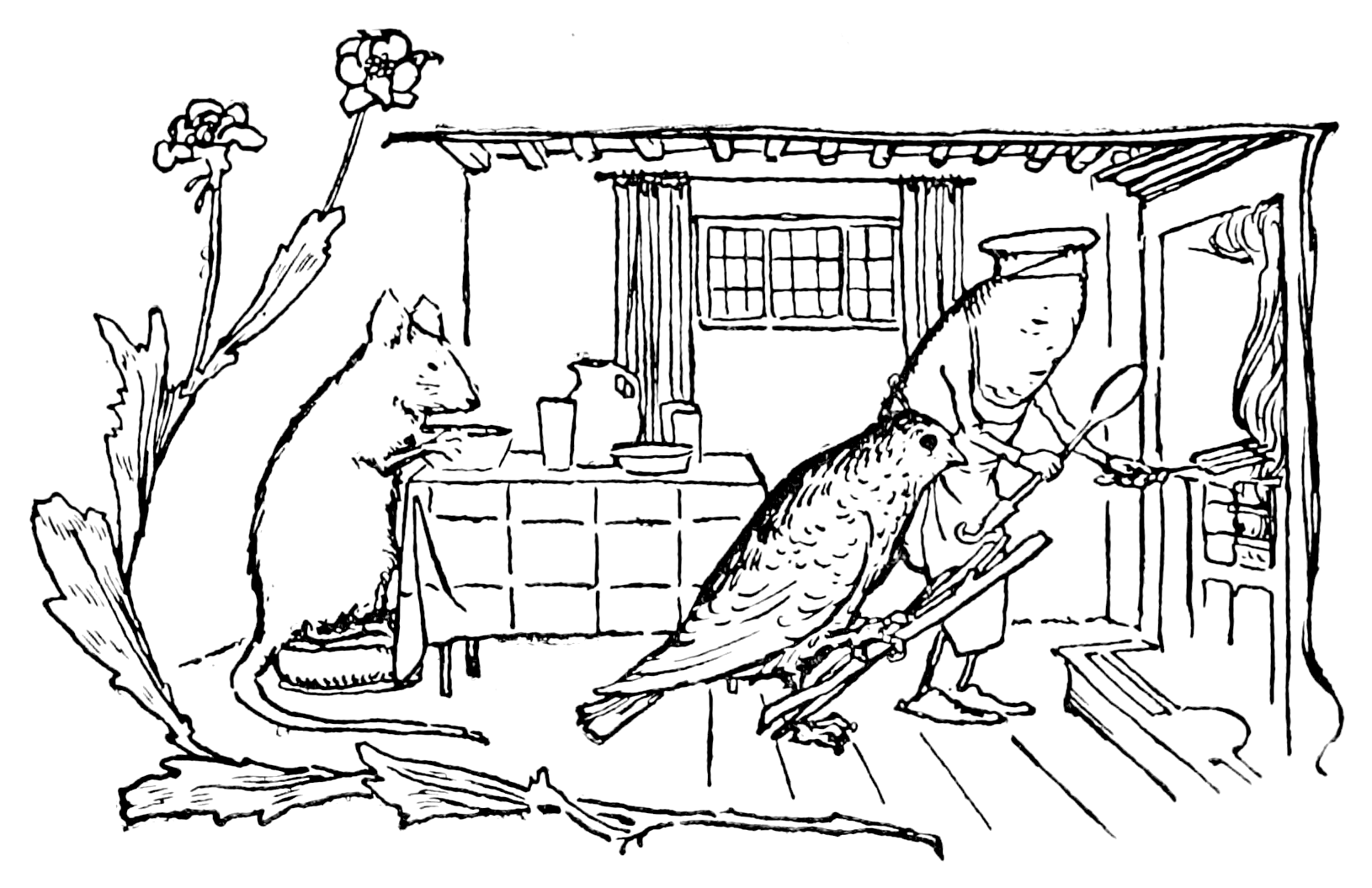
- 1912 illustration by Robert Anning Bell

Folk tale
- Name: The Mouse, the Bird, and the Sausage
- Aarne–Thompson grouping: ATU 85
- Country: Germany
- Published in: Grimms' Fairy Tales

"The Mouse, the Bird, and the Sausage" (German: Von dem Mäuschen, Vögelchen und der Bratwurst) is Tale 23 of the Grimm's Fairy Tales. It is Aarne-Thompson number 85.

== Synopsis ==
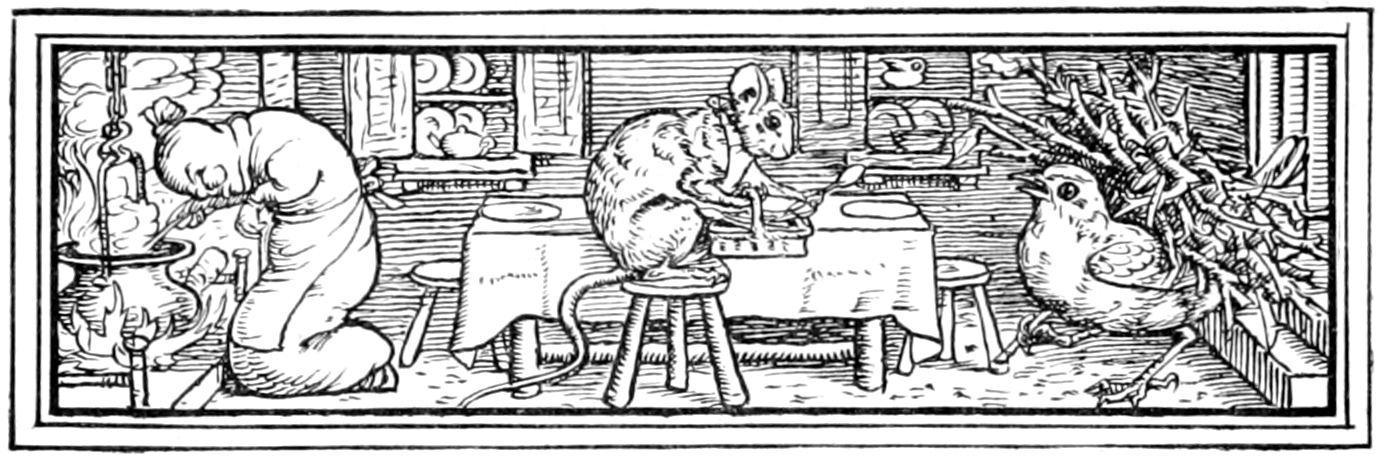
Illustration by Walter Crane

The Mouse, the Bird, and the Sausage live happily together. The Bird brings home wood from the forest; the Mouse delivers water, makes the cooking fire, lays the table; and the Sausage cooks.

One day, the Bird has a chat with some other birds. They make fun of the Bird, saying that while the Mouse and Sausage sit comfortably at home, the Bird is sent out to do all the work. The next day, the Bird demands that they switch roles and refuses to go to the forest. The Mouse and the Sausage oppose the idea at first, but in the end, they give in. The Bird now is responsible for bringing home the water, the Mouse cooks, and the Sausage goes to the forest to collect wood.

The Sausage leaves to gather wood in the forest early in the morning but does not come home again. The Bird gets worried and starts looking for it. Soon, it finds a dog, who has attacked and eaten the Sausage. The Bird lodges a complaint against the dog, but the dog lies and says that the Sausage was carrying forged letters, and therefore it needed to be punished with its life. The Bird cannot argue, so it goes home and tells the Mouse what has happened. They decide that they will have to do their best themselves from now on.

The Mouse starts to cook. It imitates the Sausage, rolling itself in the pot to mix and season the food. However, the Mouse cannot stand the heat and is boiled alive. The Bird comes home from the forest. It panics as it cannot find the Mouse and starts throwing the wood around the house. It yells and searches, but suddenly the wood catches fire. In order to put out the fire, the Bird goes to the well to get some water. It falls into the well after dropping the bucket. The Bird cannot get back out and drowns.
