= The Boots of Buffalo Leather =

German fairy tale

Folk tale
- Name: The Boots of Buffalo Leather
- Aarne–Thompson grouping: ATU 952
- Country: Germany
- Published in: Grimms' Fairy Tales

"The Boots of Buffalo Leather" (German: Der Stiefel von Büffelleder) is a German fairy tale collected by the Brothers Grimm, number 199.

It is Aarne-Thompson type 952, The King and the Soldier.

== Synopsis ==
A soldier, renowned for his braveness, has just been relieved from the army. He owns an old rain coat and boots in buffalo leather. During his voyage he meets a huntsman in the woods; they are both lost. They decide to travel along together and see a house in the distance. An old woman opens the door and tells them it's a robbers' den, but the men still decide to stay, despite the huntsmen's objections. The woman hides them, but when the 12 robbers arrive home the soldier deliberately coughs to be noticed and they are immediately taken prisoner. The soldier remains calm and tells the robbers that he and his friend want to eat and drink first. The robbers allow this and after the soldier has dined he brandishes the contents of a wine bottle over the robbers' heads and says a magic spell that freezes them all, as if they were turned in stone.

The soldier and the huntsman then go to the local town to get some of the soldiers' old friends, bring them to the den and lifts the magic spell, causing the robbers to be able to move again, but they are immediately arrested and sent to prison. As the soldier and the huntsmen return with the imprisoned thieves they are greeted by a joyous crowd of people. The soldier wonders why everybody is so enthusiastic? The huntsmen explains that they have all gathered to greet the king, who was absent for a long time but has now returned to the country. When the soldiers asks where the king is it turns out that the huntsman is the king in disguise, and the king promises to supply his needs thereafter, but the soldier must never drink his health without permission.
