= The Emperor's New Clothes =

1837 fairy tale by Hans Christian Andersen

- Short story by Hans Christian Andersen
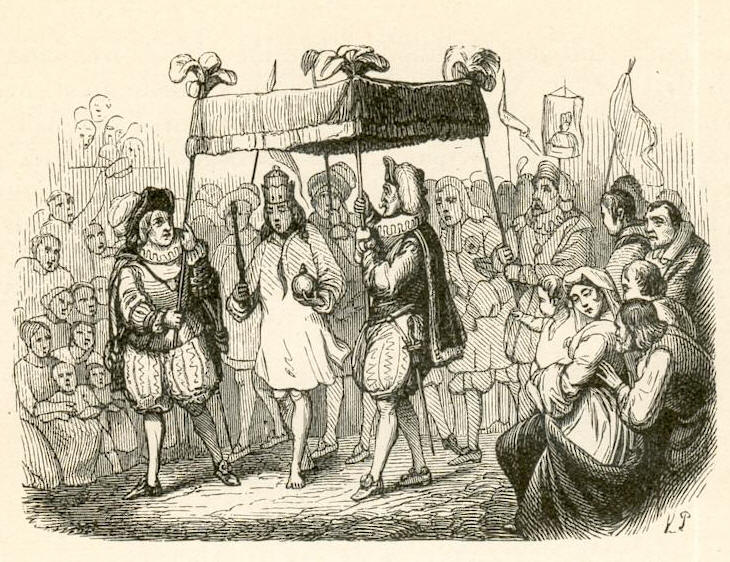
- Illustration by Vilhelm Pedersen, Andersen's first illustrator

Text available at Wikisource

Text available at Danish Wikisource
- Original title: Kejserens nye klæder
- Country: Denmark
- Language: Danish
- Genre: Literary fairy tale

Publication
- Published in: Fairy Tales Told for Children. First Collection. Third Booklet. 1837. (Eventyr, fortalte for Børn. Første Samling. Tredie Hefte. 1837.)
- Publication type: Fairy tale collection
- Publisher: C.A. Reitzel
- Publication date: 7 April 1837

Chronology
The Little Mermaid	Only a Fiddler

"The Emperor's New Clothes" (Danish: Kejserens nye klæder [ˈkʰɑjsɐns ˈnyˀə ˈkʰleːðə, - ˈkʰleːɐ̯]) is a literary fairy tale written by the Danish author Hans Christian Andersen, about a vain emperor who gets exposed before his subjects. The tale has been translated into over 100 languages.

"The Emperor's New Clothes" was first published with "The Little Mermaid" in Copenhagen, Denmark, by C. A. Reitzel, on 7 April 1837, as the third and final installment of Andersen's Fairy Tales Told for Children. The tale has been adapted to various media, and the story's title, the phrase "the Emperor has no clothes", and variations thereof have been adopted for use in numerous other works and as idioms.

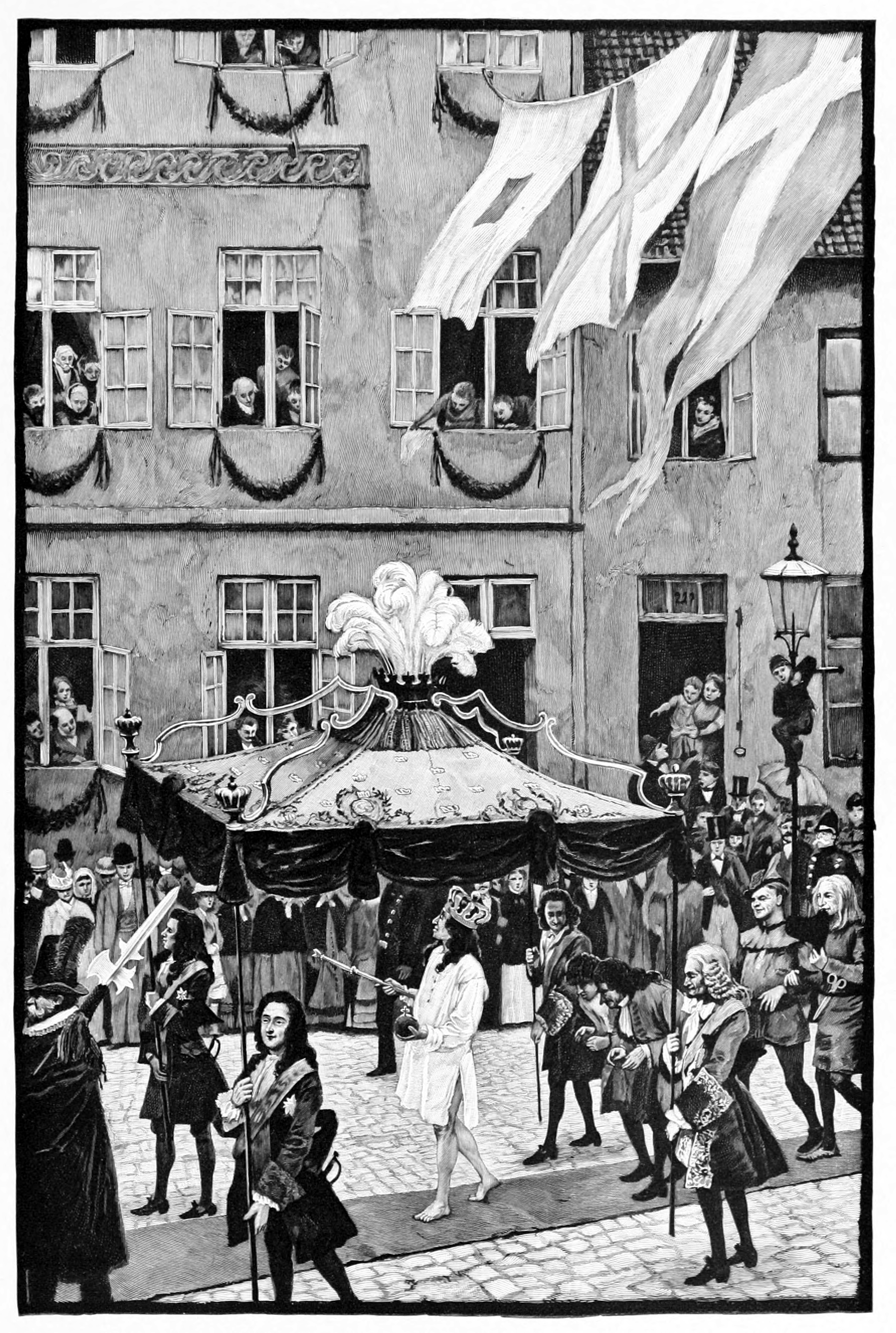
Illustration by Hans Tegner, 1900

== Plot ==
The tale concerns an emperor who has an obsession with fancy new clothes, and spends lavishly on them at the expense of state matters. One day, two conmen visit the emperor's capital. Posing as weavers, they offer to supply him with magnificent clothes that are invisible to those who are either incompetent or stupid. The gullible emperor hires them, and they set up looms and pretend to go to work. A succession of officials, starting with the emperor's wise and competent minister, and then ending with the emperor himself, visit them to check their progress. Each sees that the looms are empty but pretends otherwise to avoid being thought a fool or incompetent.

Finally, the "weavers" report that the emperor's suit is finished. They mime dressing him and he sets off in a procession before the whole city. The townsfolk uncomfortably go along with the pretense, not wanting to appear inept or stupid, complimenting the emperor's attire, until a child blurts out that the emperor is wearing nothing at all. The entire town then realizes the truth of the observation and repeats the child's cry. The emperor awkwardly realizes he is indeed wearing nothing at all, but opts to continue with the procession, unwilling to admit that he has been duped.

== Sources ==
Andersen's tale is based on a 1335 story from the Libro de los ejemplos (or El Conde Lucanor), a medieval Spanish collection of fifty-one cautionary tales with various sources such as Aesop and other classical writers and Persian folktales, by Juan Manuel, Prince of Villena (1282–1348). Andersen did not know the Spanish original but read the tale in a German translation titled "So ist der Lauf der Welt" ("That's the way of the world"). In the source tale, a king is hoodwinked by weavers who claim to make a suit of clothes invisible to any man not the son of his presumed father; Andersen altered the source tale to direct the focus on courtly pride and intellectual vanity rather than adulterous paternity.

There is also an Indian version of the story, which appears in the Līlāvatīsāra by Jinaratna (1283), a summary of a now-lost anthology of fables, the Nirvāṇalīlāvatī by Jineśvara (1052). The dishonest merchant Dhana from Hastināpura swindles the king of Śrāvastī by offering to weave a supernatural garment that cannot be seen or touched by any person of illegitimate birth. When the king is supposedly wearing the garment, his whole court pretends to admire it. The king is then paraded about his city to show off the garment; when the common folk ask him if he has become a naked ascetic, he realizes the deception, but the swindler has already fled.

== Commentaries ==
Hollis Robbins, in "The Emperor's New Critique" (2003), argues that the tale is itself so transparent "that there has been little need for critical scrutiny". Robbins argues that Andersen's tale "quite clearly rehearses four contemporary controversies: the institution of a meritocratic civil service, the valuation of labor, the expansion of democratic power, and the appraisal of art". Robbins concludes that the story's appeal lies in its "seductive resolution" of the conflict by the truth-telling boy.

Naomi Wood of Kansas State University challenges Robbins's reading, arguing that before the World Trade Center attacks of 2001, "Robbins's argument might seem merely playful, anti-intuitive, and provocative." Wood concludes: "Perhaps the truth of 'The Emperor's New Clothes' is not that the child's truth is mercifully free of adult corruption, but that it recognizes the terrifying possibility that whatever words we may use to clothe our fears, the fabric cannot protect us from them."

In 2017, Robbins returned to the tale to suggest that the courtiers who pretend not to see what they see are models of men in a workplace who claim not to see harassment.

== Adaptations ==
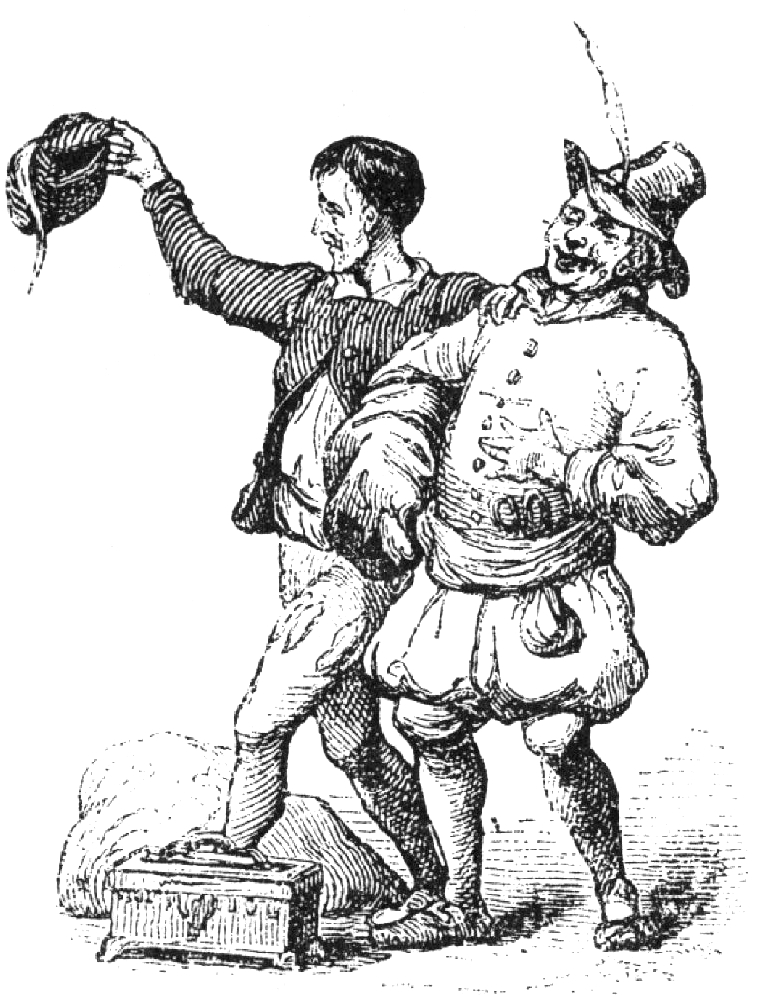
Vilhelm Pedersen illustration

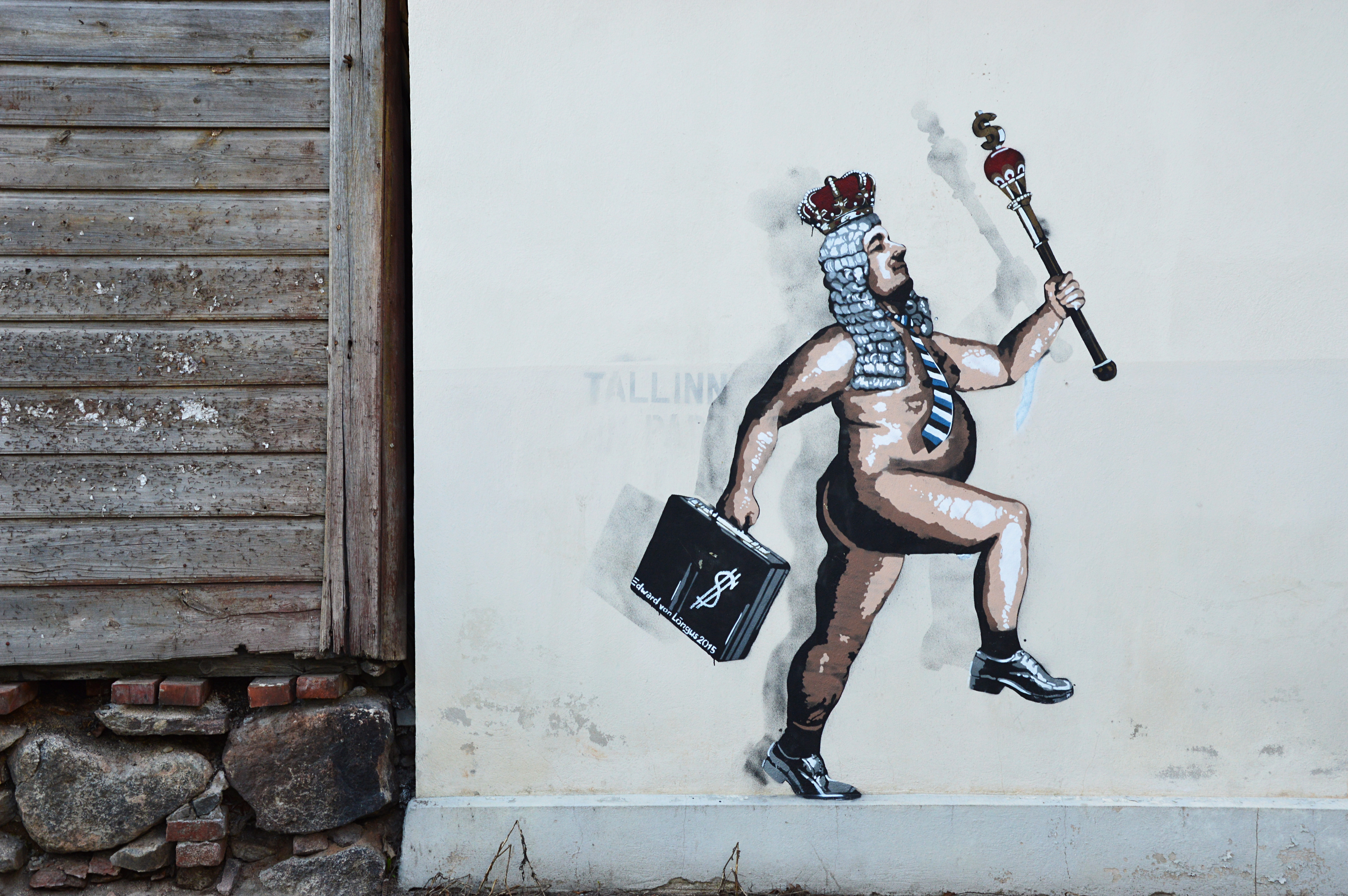
Graffiti in Tartu

Various adaptations of the tale have appeared since its first publication.

=== Film and television ===
1919 Russian short film directed by Yuri Zhelyabuzhsky

In 1953, theatrical short titled The Emperor's New Clothes, produced by UPA, directed by Ted Parmelee and starring Hans Conried as the voice of the tailors.

In 1961, Croatian feature film The Emperor's New Clothes directed by Ante Babaja, writer Božidar Violić (see IMDb).

In the 1965 Doctor Who serial The Romans, the Doctor uses the story as inspiration to avoid his disguise as a lyre player being discovered. He later claims to have given Andersen the original idea for the story in the first place.

In 1967, Videocraft International released The Daydreamer, written by Arthur Rankin Jr. and directed by Jules Bass. An anthology film, The Daydreamer features several segments inspired by Hans Christian Andersen fairy tales, animated in Rankin-Bass' signature "Animagic" style, as well as a live-action wraparound story. One of these segments is "The Emperor's New Clothes," featuring the voice of Ed Wynn as the emperor, as well as Terry-Thomas, Victor Borge, and Paul O'Keefe.

In 1970, Patrick Wymark appeared as the Emperor in Hans Christian Andersen, an Australian musical and comedy television special highlighting three of Andersen's most famous stories. It was broadcast five weeks after Wymark's untimely death in Melbourne.

In 1972, Rankin/Bass Productions adapted the tale as the first and only musical episode of ABC series The Enchanted World of Danny Kaye, featuring Danny Kaye (who, 20 years earlier, had portrayed Hans Christian Andersen in the musical of the same name), Cyril Ritchard, Imogene Coca, Allen Swift, and Bob McFadden. The television special features eight songs with music by Maury Laws and lyrics by Jules Bass, and combines live action filmed in Aarhus, Denmark, animation, special effects, and the stop motion animation process "Animagic" made in Japan.

In 1978, this story was used to create a four-episode special of El Chapulín Colorado, a Mexican TV show created by Roberto Gomez Bolaños. In the special, Bolaños is the helper of an arts and crafts worker who pretends to have a fantastic fabric that only smart people can see, using it to trick the king. The special compiled several children stories, from Andersen to Brothers Grimm. The episode is known as "The Valiant Little Tailor", inspired from the Grimm's tale.

In 1985, Shelley Duvall's Faerie Tale Theatre adapted the fairy tale, starring Dick Shawn as the Emperor while Alan Arkin and Art Carney starred as the con artists.

The 1987, Japanese war documentary film The Emperor's Naked Army Marches On, by director Kazuo Hara, centers on 62-year-old Kenzō Okuzaki, veteran of Japan's Second World War campaign in New Guinea, and follows him around as he searches out those responsible for the unexplained deaths of two soldiers in his old unit.

The Emperor's New Clothes, a 1987 musical comedy adaptation of the fairy tale starring Sid Caesar, part of the Cannon Movie Tales. series

The Emperor's New Clothes (1991) animated film, by Burbank Animation Studios.

Wolves, Witches and Giants had an episode based on the story, with recurring villains the Wolf and the Fox filling the role of the swindlers.

Muppet Classic Theater has an adaptation of the story with Fozzie Bear as the emperor, and with Rizzo the Rat and two of his fellow rats as the swindlers.

Despite the phrasing of the title, the 2000 film The Emperor's New Groove by Walt Disney Animation Studios is not related to Andersen's classic tale, although both stories involve a vain emperor being tricked.

An original video animation (OVA) episode of the anime franchise Bikini Warriors humorously adapts the tale, wherein the main characters are stripped nude by an unseen deity under the pretense that it has actually gifted them with a new, legendary bikini armor that only "idiots" are unable to see.

HBO Family aired an animated adaptation called The Emperor's Newest Clothes in 2018. Alan Alda narrated the tale and Jeff Daniels was the voice of the Emperor.

=== Music ===
On 1 March 1957, Bing Crosby recorded a musical adaptation of the story for children which was issued as an album Never Be Afraid by Golden Records in 1957.

The song "The Emperor's New Clothes" was written and released by Sinead O'Connor in 1990 on her sophomore album I Do Not Want What I Haven't Got. She speaks of a system that will be exposed in time "through their own words," most likely referencing the Catholic Church.

In 2001, Elton John and Bernie Taupin wrote a song titled "The Emperor's New Clothes" for Elton's 26th album Songs from the West Coast. It tells the story about a young couple who lose everything after "cheating the system", but reminisce about the amazing times they've had.

In 2010, Spock's Beard (an American Progressive Rock band), released the album X, the third track of which is titled "The Emperor's Clothes." The song is sung from the perspective of a would-be scammer who seeks to expose various "hotshots and bigwigs" to one another.

In 2014 nerdcore rapper MC Frontalot released an alblum called Question Bedtime the fifth track called I Can See is an adaptation of the story. However the ending is different where the towns folk revolt and overthrow the emperor.

== Idiom ==
As an idiom, use of the story's title refers to something widely accepted as true or professed as being praiseworthy, due to an unwillingness of the general population to criticize it or be seen as going against popular opinion. The phrase "emperor's new clothes" has become an idiom about logical fallacies. The story may be explained by pluralistic ignorance or collective illusions. In the story, townspeople pretend to see the emperor's non-existent outfit to fit in. Everyone is ignorant to whether the emperor has clothes on or not, but believes that everyone else is not ignorant. This is an example of a situation where "no one believes, but everyone believes that everyone else believes." Simply put, collective illusions arise when individuals conform to a group's false beliefs, often out of social pressure.

== See also ==
- Abilene paradox
- Asch conformity experiments
- The Courtier's Reply
- Elephant in the room
- The Emperor's New Groove
- Gaslighting
- Groupthink
- Knowledge falsification
- Mutual knowledge (logic)
- Polite fiction
- Pluralistic ignorance
- Preference falsification
- Social-desirability bias
- Spiral of silence
- Three men make a tiger
- Virtue signalling
- Wishful thinking
