= Grimm's Fairy Tale Classics =

Japanese anime television series

- Original title screen

グリム名作劇場 (Gurimu Meisaku Gekijō)
- Genre: Adventure; Fantasy
- Anime television series
- Directed by: Hiroshi Saito
- Produced by: Takaji Matsudo
- Written by: Hiroshi Saito; Nobiyuki Fujimoto; Yu Yamamoto
- Studio: Nippon Animation
- Licensed by: NA: Discotek Media
- Original network: ANN (ABC)
- English network: AU: Nine Network; NZ: Channel 2 TV3; UK: Fox Kids; US: Nickelodeon; ZA: TV1
- Original run: October 21, 1987 – March 30, 1988
- Episodes: 24
- Anime television series

New Grimm's Fairy Tale Classics
- Directed by: Hiroshi Saito
- Produced by: Takaji Matsudo
- Written by: Yu Yamamoto; Nobiyuki Fujimoto; Akira Miyazaki
- Studio: Nippon Animation
- Licensed by: NA: Discotek Media
- Original network: ANN (ABC)
- English network: AU: Nine Network; US: Nickelodeon
- Original run: October 2, 1988 – March 26, 1989
- Episodes: 23

Grimm's Fairy Tale Classics, also known as Grimm Masterpiece Theater (グリム名作劇場 Gurimu meisaku gekijō) in the original version and The Grimm's Fairy Tales (in Australia and New Zealand), is a Japanese anime anthology series by Nippon Animation based on the Grimms' Fairy Tales.

== Premise ==
Grimm's Fairy Tale Classics adapted several old favorites, taking liberties in some cases. The series also contains many obscure fairy tales, though some of these were removed from later reissues of the volume. Some were eliminated because they originated outside Germany, and therefore did not appear in the Brothers Grimm's collection of stories, such as Puss in Boots, Bluebeard and Beauty and the Beast. The Worn-Out Dancing Shoes is instead based on a variation of the tale reported by the Brothers Grimm in the notes of the first edition of the book. Most of the tales were presented in one episode, while some stories in the first season were told over two or four episodes for a total of 41 fairy tales. Similar to Andersen Stories (1971), a green-haired female pixie was used as a framing device, though limiting herself to announce the titles and never getting involved with the plot.

The show comprises two series. The first series, known in Japan as Grimm Masterpiece Theater (グリム名作劇場, Gurimu Meisaku Gekijō), aired from October 21, 1987, to March 30, 1988, for a total of 24 episodes. The second series, known in Japan as New Grimm Masterpiece Theater (新グリム名作劇場, Shin Gurimu Meisaku Gekijō), aired between October 2, 1988, and March 26, 1989, totaling 23 episodes. Both series were produced by Nippon Animation with the cooperation of Asahi Broadcasting Corporation in Osaka. It was also localized under the series' English name.

The fairy tale anthology was broadcast in the United States by Nickelodeon, in local stations throughout Europe, Latin America (where it is still popular, particularly in Colombia), Philippines, Israel, Arab world, New Zealand and Australia.

== Episodes ==
=== Series 1 ===
No.	Title	Based on	Original release date	English airdate
1	"The Travelling Musicians of Bremen" (The Musicians of Bremen); Transliteration: "Bureemen no ongaku tai" (Japanese: ブレーメンの音楽隊)	Town Musicians of Bremen	October 21, 1987	January 7, 1989
2	"Hansel and Gretel" (Hansel and Gretel); Transliteration: "Henzeru to Gureeteru" (Japanese: ヘンゼルとグレーテル)	Hansel and Gretel	October 28, 1987	January 7, 1989
3	"The Frog Prince" (The Princess and the Frog); Transliteration: "Kaeru to oujo" (Japanese: かえると王女)	The Frog Prince	November 4, 1987 (Part 1); November 11, 1987 (Part 2)	May 14, 1989
4	"Little Red Riding Hood" (Hooded Red); Transliteration: "Akazukin" (Japanese: 赤ずきん)	Little Red Riding Hood	November 18, 1987	June 4, 1989
5	"The Golden Goose" (The Golden Goose); Transliteration: "Kin no gachou" (Japanese: 金のがちょう)	The Golden Goose	November 25, 1987	June 4, 1989
6	"Puss in Boots" (The Cat Who Wore Boots); Transliteration: "Nagagutsu o hai ta neko" (Japanese: 長靴をはいた猫)	Puss in Boots	December 2, 1987 (Part 1); December 9, 1987 (Part 2)	March 5, 1989
7	"Snow White and Rose Red" (Snow White and Rose Red); Transliteration: "Yuki shiro to bara beni" (Japanese: ゆき白とばら紅)	Snow-White and Rose-Red	December 16, 1987	July 16, 1989
8	"Snow White" (Snow White); Transliteration: "Shirayukihime" (Japanese: 白雪姫)	Snow White	December 23, 1987 (Part 1); December 30, 1987 (Part 2); January 6, 1988 (Part 3); January 13, 1988 (Part 4)	February 12, 1989
9	"The Six Who Went Far in the World" (The Six Renowned Men); Transliteration: "6 nin no go uke tsu" (Japanese: 6人のごうけつ)	How Six Made Their Way in the World	January 20, 1988	January 12, 1991
10	"The Water of Life" (The Water of Life); Transliteration: "Inochi no mizu" (Japanese: 命の水)	The Water of Life	January 27, 1988	August 13, 1989
11	"Bluebeard" (Bluebeard); Transliteration: "Ao hi ge" (Japanese: 青ひげ)	Bluebeard	February 3, 1988	N/A
12	"Jorinde and Joringel" (Yorinde and Yoringel); Transliteration: "Yorinde to Yoringeru" (Japanese: ヨリンデとヨリンゲル)	Jorinde and Joringel	February 10, 1988	July 7, 1990
13	"Briar Rose" (Princess Briar Rose); Transliteration: "Nobara hime" (Japanese: 野ばら姫)	Sleeping Beauty	February 17, 1988	April 1, 1989
14	"Old Sultan" (Old Man Sultan); Transliteration: "Zurutan jiisan" (Japanese: ズルタンじいさん)	Old Sultan	February 24, 1988	July 16, 1989
15	"King Grizzle Beard" (King Thrushbeard); Transliteration: "Tsugumi no hi ge no ousama" (Japanese: つぐみのひげの王さま)	King Thrushbeard	March 2, 1988	April 1, 1989
16	"The Naughty Spirit" (The Demon and the Devil); Transliteration: "Akuma to dai maou" (Japanese: 悪魔と大魔王)	The Devil and his Grandmother	March 9, 1988	N/A
17	"The Worn-Out Dancing Shoes" (The Sewn-Up Dancing Shoes that Wore-Out); Transliteration: "Odori nui te boroboro ni naru kutsu" (Japanese: 踊りぬいてボロボロになる靴)	The Worn-Out Dancing Shoes	March 16, 1988	July 7, 1990
18	"Cinderella" (Cinderella); Transliteration: "Shinderera" (Japanese: シンデレラ)	Cinderella	March 23, 1988 (Part 1); March 30, 1988 (Part 2)	January 7, 1989

=== Series 2 ===
No.	Title	Based on	Original release date	English airdate
1	"The Crystal Ball" (The Crystal Ball); Transliteration: "Suishou no tama" (Japanese: 水晶の玉)	The Crystal Ball	October 2, 1988	N/A
2	"The Marriage of Mrs. Fox" (The Marriage of Mrs. Fox); Transliteration: "Oku sama kitsune no go konrei" (Japanese: おくさま狐のご婚礼)	The Wedding of Mrs. Fox	October 9, 1988	N/A
3	"Beauty and the Beast" (The Story of the Summer Garden and the Winter Garden); Transliteration: "natsu no niwa to fuyu no niwa no hanashi" (Japanese: 夏の庭と冬の庭の話)	The Summer and Winter Garden or Beauty and the Beast	October 16, 1988	October 6, 1991
4	"The Magic Heart" (The Cabbage Donkey); Transliteration: "Kyabetsu roba" (Japanese: キャベツろば)	Donkey Cabbages	October 23, 1988	November 3, 1990
5	"Rapunzel" (Rapunzel); Transliteration: "Rapuntsēru" (Japanese: ラプンツェル)	Rapunzel	October 30, 1988	February 3, 1991
6	"The Old Woman in the Woods" (The Old Woman in the Woods); Transliteration: "Mori no naka no baasan" (Japanese: 森のなかのばあさん)	The Old Woman in the Wood	November 13, 1988	N/A
7	"The Faithful Watchmen" (The Grave Mound); Transliteration: "Do manjuu" (Japanese: どまんじゅう)	The Grave Mound	November 20, 1988	N/A
8	"The Wolf and the Fox" (The Wolf and the Fox); Transliteration: "ookami to kitsune" (Japanese: 狼と狐)	The Wolf and the Fox	November 27, 1988	September 8, 1990
9	"Mother Holle" (Auntie Holle); Transliteration: "Hore no obasan" (Japanese: ホレのおばさん)	Mother Holle	December 4, 1988	N/A
10	"The Six Swans" (The Six Swans); Transliteration: "Roku wa no hakuchou" (Japanese: 六羽の白鳥)	The Six Swans	December 11, 1988	N/A
11	"The Coat of Many Colours" (Thousand-Furs); Transliteration: "sen biki gawa" (Japanese: 千びき皮)	Allerleirauh	December 18, 1988	January 6, 1991
12	"Brother and Sister" (Brother and Sister); Transliteration: "Ane to otouto" (Japanese: 姉と弟)	Brother and Sister	December 25, 1988	November 3, 1990
13	"The Four Skillful Brothers" (The Four Skillful Brothers); Transliteration: "meijin yonin kyoudai" (Japanese: 名人四人兄弟)	The Four Skillful Brothers	January 15, 1989	October 12, 1991
14	"The Spirit in the Bottle" (The Spirit in the Glass Bottle); Transliteration: "Garasubin no naka no bakemonoe" (Japanese: ガラス瓶の中の化け物)	The Spirit in the Bottle	January 22, 1989	N/A
15	"The Iron Stove" (The Iron Stove); Transliteration: "Tetsu no sutoobu" (Japanese: 鉄のストーブ)	The Iron Stove	January 29, 1989	N/A
16	"Bearskin" (The Man Who Wore the Bearskin); Transliteration: "kuma no kawa o ki ta otoko" (Japanese: 熊の皮をきた男)	Bearskin	February 5, 1989	June 2, 1991
17	"The Hare and the Hedgehog" (The Hare and the Hedgehog); Transliteration: "Usagi to hari nezumi" (Japanese: 兎とはりねずみ)	The Hare and the Hedgehog	February 12, 1989	May 11, 1991
18	"The Man of Iron" (Iron Hans); Transliteration: "tetsu no hansu" (Japanese: 鉄のハンス)	Iron John	February 19, 1989	May 11, 1991
19	"The Brave Little Tailor" (The Brave Little Tailor); Transliteration: "Yuukan na chibi no shitateya" (Japanese: 勇敢なチビの仕立て屋)	The Brave Little Tailor	February 26, 1989	June 9, 1990
20	"The Wren and the Bear" (The Wren and the Bear); Transliteration: "Misosazai to kuma" (Japanese: みそさざいと熊)	The Willow-Wren and the Bear	March 5, 1989	June 9, 1990
21	"Rumpelstiltskin" (The Nymph's Name); Transliteration: "yousei no namae" (Japanese: 妖精の名前)	Rumpelstiltskin	March 12, 1989	March 17, 1991
22	"The Water Nixie" (The Nixie of the Pond); Transliteration: "Ike ni sumu mizu no majo" (Japanese: 池に住む水の魔女)	The Nixie of the Mill-Pond	March 19, 1989	N/A
23	"Godfather Death" (Godfather Death); Transliteration: "Shinigami no naduke oya" (Japanese: 死神の名づけ親)	Godfather Death	March 26, 1989	N/A

== Cast ==
=== Japanese cast ===
- Mitsuko Horie - Narrator, Little Red Riding Hood (in "Little Red Riding Hood"), Princess (in "The Golden Goose"), Rose-Red (in "Snow White and Rose Red"), Princess (in "The Water of Life"), Kasia (in "Jorinde and Joringel"), Princess (in "Briar Rose"), Youngest Daughter (in "The Shoes that were Danced to Pieces"), Cinderella (in "Cinderella"), Maria (in "Beauty and the Beast"), Witch Daughter (in "The Magic Heart"), Rapunzel (in "Rapunzel"), Hildegard (in "Mother Holle"), Princess (in "The Four Skillful Brothers"), Princess (in "The Six Swans"), Cristina (in "Bearskin"), Lily (in "The Marriage of Mrs. Fox"), Princess (in "The Coat of Many Colours"), Princess (in "Iron Hans"), Princess (in "The Iron Stove"), Wren Child (in "The Wren and The Bear"), Hunchman's Wife (in "The Water Nixie")
- Kenichi Ogata - Cat (in "The Travelling Musicians of Bremen"), Hunter (in "Little Red Riding Hood"), Shoemaker (in "Puss in Boots"), King (in "Briar Rose"), Hat Man (in "The Six Who Went Far in the World"), Rooster (in "Mother Holle"), Spirit (in "The Spirit in the Bottle"), bakemonoe (in "Garasubin no naka no bakemonoe"), Frog (in "The Iron Stove"), Sisters' Father (in "Bearskin"), King (in "The Man of Iron"), General (in "The Brave Little Tailor"), Wolf (in "The Wren and The Bear"), God (in "Godfather Death")
- Minoru Inaba - Miller (in "The Travelling Musicians of Bremen"), Woodcutter (in "Little Red Riding Hood"), Hans' Father (in "The Golden Goose"), Cook and Farmer (in "Puss in Boots"), Councilor (in "The Six Who Went Far in the World"), North Wind (in "The Water of Life"), Soldier (in "Briar Rose"), Cook (in "King Thrushbeard"), Captain (in "The Naughty Spirit"), Restaurateur (in "King Thrushbeard"), Four-tailed Fox (in "The Marriage of Mrs. Fox"), Child (in "The Six Swans"), Soldier (in "Iron Stove"), Craftsman (in "The Man of Iron"), Councilor (in "Rumpelstiltskin")
- Kōzō Shioya - Soldier (in "The Frog Prince"), Franz (in "The Golden Goose"), Snorter Man (in "The Six Who Went Far in the World"), Eldest Prince (in "The Water of Life"), Third Brother (in "Bluebeard"), Farmer (in "Old Sultan"), King Turna (in "King Thrushbeard"), Deserted Soldier (in "The Naughty Spirit"), Devil (in "The Shoes that were Danced to Pieces"), Dove Husband (in "Cinderella"), Fox Hunk (in "The Marriage of Mrs. Fox"), Hare (in "The Hare and the Hedgehog")
- Noriko Uemura - Mrs. Hedgehog (in "The Hare and the Hedgehog"), Witch Sister (in "Briar Rose"), Woman (in "Rapunzel"), Housewife (in "The Wolf and Fox"), Witch (in "The Six Swans"), Mother (in "The Spirit in the Bottle"), Neighbor (in "Bearskin"), Old Woman (in "The Wren and The Bear"), Miller's Wife (in "The Water Nixie"), Mother (in "Godfather Death")
- Ichirō Nagai - Puss in Boots (in "Puss in Boots"), Old Woodsman (in "The Water of Life"), Dwarf (in "Snow White"), Old Wolf (in "Old Sultan"), King (in "Cinderella"), Father (in "The Four Skillful Brothers"), Rumpelstiltskin (in "Rumpelstiltskin"), Wolf (in "The Wolf and the Fox")
- Daisuke Gōri - Soldier (in "The Frog Prince"), Huntsman and Dwarf (in "Snow White"), Devil (in "The Water of Life"), Devil (in "The Water of Life"), Monster (in "The Crystal Ball"), Beast (in "Beauty and the Beast"), Head Cook (in "The Coat of Many Colours"), Giant (in "The Brave Little Tailor")
- Michitaka Kobayashi - Devil (in "The Naughty Spirit"), Man (in "The Shoes that were Danced to Pieces"), Thief (in "The Old Woman in the Wood"), Child (in "The Six Swans"), Soldier (in "Coat of Many Colors"), Hotel's Owner (in "Bearskin"), Town Man (in "Rumpelstiltskin"), Coachman (in "Godfather Death")
- Mitsuaki Hoshino - Servant (in "Bluebeard"), Guard and Tree (in "Cinderella"), Third-tailed Fox (in "The Mariage of Mrs. Fox"), Thief (in "The Old Woman in the Woods"), Man (in "The Man of Iron"), Bee (in "The Wren and The Bear"), Landlord (in "The Water Nixie")
- Yoku Shioya - Youngest Son (in "Puss in Boots"), Youngest Prince (in "The Water of Life"), Youngest Brother (in "Crystal Ball"), Hunchman (in "The Magic Heart"), Woodcutter's Son (in "The Spirit in the Bottle"), Fox (in "The Wolf and the Fox"), Tailor (in "The Brave Little Tailor")
- Junko Hagimori - Baby Duck (in "The Wolf and The Fox"), Child (in "The Coat of Many Colours"), Boy (in "The Spirit in The Bottle"), Child (in "The Hare and the Hedgehog"), Wren Child (in "The Wren and The Bear"), Miller's Son (young, in "The Water Nixie")
- Kōhei Miyauchi - Dwarf (in "Snow White"), King (in "The Water of Life", "The Shoes that were Danced to Pieces", "Godfather Death" and "The Iron Stove"), Woodcutter (in "The Spirit in the Bottle")
- Masato Hirano - Knight (in "The Four Skillful Brothers"), Cook (in "The Man of Iron"), Mosquito (in "The Wren and the Bear"), Man (in "Rumpelstiltskin"), Butler (in "Godfather Death")
- Shigeru Chiba - Frog Prince (in "The Frog Prince"), Dwarf (in "Snow White"), Hunchman (in "The Six Who Went Far in the World"), Devil (in "The Marriage of Mrs. Fox"), Fox (in "The Wren and The Bear")
- Tomoko Maruo - Sister of Princess (in "The Frog Prince"), Maid (in "Snow White", "Bluebeard"), Witch Sister (in "Briar Rose"), Woman (in "The Worn-Out Dancing Shoes"), Stepsister (in "Cinderella")
- Bin Shimada - Hans (in "The Golden Goose"), Dwarf (in "Snow White"), Deserted Soldier (in "The Naughty Spirit"), Johan (in "Bearskin"), Hunchman (in "The Water Nixie")
- Hōchū Ōtsuka - Rapunzel's Father (in "Rapunzel"), Rabbit (in "Mother Holle"), Soldier (in "The Grave Mound"), Eldest Brother (in "The Four Skillful Brothers"), Lumberjack (in "The Spirit in the Bottle")
- Ikuya Sawaki - Farmer (in "The Golden Goose"), Farmer (in "The Six Who Went Far in the World"), Thief (in "The Old Woman in the Woods"), General (in "The Water of Life"), General (in "The Brave Little Tailor")
- Keaton Yamada - Councilor (in "Briar Rose"), Old Man (in "The Magic Heart"), Frog (in "The Iron Stove"), Soldier (in "The Brave Little Tailor"), Miller (in "The Water Nixie")
- Kimie Hantani - Village Woman (in "Little Red Riding Hood"), Princess (in "Puss in Boots"), Maid (in "The Water of Life"), Witch Sister (in "Briar Rose"), Child (in "The Grave Mound")
- Masaharu Satō - Councilor (in "The Golden Goose"), Captain (in "The Six Who Went Far in the World"), Old Man (in "Jorinde and Joringel"), Miller (in "The Magic Heart"), Servant (in "Brother and Sister")
- Shinobu Adachi - Sister of Princess (in "The Frog Prince"), Witch Sister (in "Briar Rose"), Dove Wife (in "Cinderella"), Hen in ("Mother Holle"), Gisela (in "Bearskin")
- Takuzo Kamiyama - King (in "The Frog Prince", "Puss in Boots", "The Six Who Went Far in the World", "The Brave Little Tailor"), Landlord (in "The Grave Mound")
- Gara Takashima - Magic Mirror (in "Snow White"), Kasia's Mother (in "Jorinde and Joringel"), Rapunzel's Mother (in "Rapunzel"), Wife (in "Godfather Death")
- Jōji Yanami - Dog (in "The Travelling Musicians of Bremen"), Dwarf (in "Snow White"), Old Sultan (in "Old Sultan"), Old Man (in "The Hare and the Hedgehog")
- Kyōko Tongū - Girl in Hotel (in "The Golden Goose"), Deserted Soldier (in "The Naughty Spirit"), Stepsister (in "Cinderella"), Princess (in "The Brave Little Tailor")
- Masami Kikuchi - Joringel (in "Jorinde and Joringel"), Prince (in "Cinderella"), Third Brother (in "The Six Swans"), Youngest Brother (in "The Four Skillful Brothers")
- Megumi Hayashibara - Rapunzel's Son (in "Rapunzel"), Youngest Brother (in "The Six Swans"), Child (in "The Hare and the Hedgehog"), Girl and Wren Child (in "The Wren and The Bear")
- Nana Yamaguchi - Queen (in "The Frog Prince", "The Man of Iron"), Mother Holle (in "Mother Holle"), Old Woman (in "The Water Nixie")
- Tesshō Genda - Wolf (in "Little Red Riding Hood"), Eldest Brother (in "Bluebeard"), Devil (in "The Naughty Spirit"), Mr. Fox (in "The Marriage of Mrs. Fox")
- Atsuko Mine - Farmer's Wife (in "Old Sultan"), Mother Duck (in "The Wolf and The Fox"), Nanny (in "Brother and Sister")
- Chihoko Shigeta - Princess (in "The Six Who Went Far in the World"), Irene (in "Mother Holle"), Tetra (in "Bearskin")
- Chiyoko Kawashima - Mother (in "Little Red Riding Hood"), Farmer's Wife (in "The Grave Mound"), Sick Mother (in "Bearskin")
- Hideyuki Hori - Prince (in "Briar Rose", "The Six Swans"), Stove/Prince (in "The Iron Stove")
- Kaneto Shiozawa - Bear/Eldest Prince (in "Snow-White and Rose-Red"), Prince (in "Beauty and the Beast")
- Kōji Totani - Messenger (in "Briar Rose"), King Franz (in "King Thrushbeard"), Smith (in "The Spirit in the Bottle")
- Masaya Taki - Chamberlain (in "Cinderella"), Councilor (in "The Coat of Many Colours"), Miller (in "Rumpelstiltskin")
- Miyoko Asō - Witch (in "Hansel and Gretel", "Jorinde and Joringel", "Rapunzel")
- Osamu Saka - King (in "King Thrushbeard"), King (in "The Coat of Many Colours"), Maria's Father (in "Beauty and the Beast")
- Takurō Kitagawa - Deer (in "The Wolf and The Fox"), Farmer (in "The Man of Iron"), Councilor (in "Godfather Death")
- Yoshino Ohtori - Miller's Wife (in "The Travelling Musicians of Bremen"), Old Woman (in "King Thrushbeard"), Stepmother (in "Mother Holle")
- Chieko Honda - Gretel (in "Hansel and Gretel"), Witch (in "The Iron Stove")
- Daiki Nakamura - Florist (in "Beauty and the Beast"), Soldier (in "Brother and Sister")
- Hiromi Tsuru - Jorinde (in "Jorinde and Joringel"), Helga (in "Rumpelstiltskin")
- Jun'ichi Sugawara - Young Man (in "The Six Who Went Far in the World"), Elder Brother (in "Bluebeard")
- Kayoko Fujii - Snow-White (in "Snow White and Rose Red"), Elder Daughter (in "The Shoes that were Danced to Pieces")
- Kazue Komiya - Wicked Queen (in "Snow White"), Evil Witch (in "Briar Rose")
- Kazuhiko Inoue - Soldier (in "The Shoes that were Danced to Pieces"), Doctor (in "Godfather Death")
- Kazumi Tanaka - Minister's Pupil (in "The Golden Goose"), Waiter (in "King Thrushbeard")
- Keisuke Yamashita - Boar (in "Old Sultan"), Underground Prince (in "The Shoes that were Danced to Pieces")
- Ken Yamaguchi - Gatekeeper and Farmer (in "Puss in Boots"), Trot Man (in "The Six Who Went Far in the World")
- Koichi Yamadera - Two-tailed Fox (in "The Marriage of Mrs. Fox"), Oldest Brother (in "The Six Swans")
- Miyoko Aoba - Woman (in "The Old Woman in the Woods"), Child (in "The Coat of Many Colours")
- Naoki Tatsuta - Reaper (in "The Naughty Spirit"), Fox (in "The Hare and the Hedgehog")
- Reiko Suzuki - Hans' Mother (in "The Golden Goose"), Good Witch (in "Briar Rose")
- Reiko Yamada - Witch (in "The Magic Heart"), Stepmother/Witch (in "Brother and Sister")
- Ritsuo Sawa - Lackey (in "The Travelling Musicians of Bremen"), Pharmacist (in "The Golden Goose")
- Ryūsei Nakao - Rooster (in "The Travelling Musicians of Bremen"), Hedgehog (in "The Hare and the Hedgehog")
- Sanji Hase - Donkey (in "The Travelling Musicians of Bremen"), Heinrich (in "The Frog Prince")
- Takeshi Aono - Devil (in "The Grave Mound", "Bearskin")
- Tomomichi Nishimura - Woodcutter (in "Cinderella"), Thief (in "The Old Woman in the Woods")
- Toshiko Fujita - Evil Queen (in "The Six Swans"), Prince (in "The Man of Iron")
- Yō Yoshimura - Second Brother (in "The Four Skillful Brothers"), Crow (in "The Wren and The Bear")
- Yukitoshi Hori - Farmer (in "The Wolf and The Fox"), Child (in "The Six Swans")
- Ai Orikasa - Boy (in "Bearskin")
- Akiko Tsuboi - Queen (in "Briar Rose")
- Akio Nojima - King Thrushbeard/Musician (in "King Thrushbeard")
- Banjō Ginga - Iron Hans (in "The Man of Iron")
- Chie Kitagawa - Stepmother (in "Hansel and Gretel")
- Chie Satō - Maid (in "The Iron Stove")
- Chika Sakamoto - Hedgehog Son (in "The Hare and the Hedgehog")
- Chikao Ohtsuka - Death (in "Godfather Death")
- Haru Endo - Doris (in "Snow White")
- Hideyuki Tanaka - King (in "Brother and Sister")
- Hiroko Emori - Girl in Hotel (in "The Golden Goose")
- Hiroko Maruyama - Witch (in "The Old Woman in the Woods")
- Hiroshi Izawa - Peasant (in "The Grave Mound")
- Hiroshi Masuoka - Bear (in "The Wren and The Bear")
- Hiroshi Takemura - Second Brother (in "The Six Swans")
- Jūrōta Kosugi - King (in "Rumpelstiltskin")
- Katsuji Mori - Prince (in "Rapunzel")
- Katsumi Suzuki - Soldier (in "The Brave Little Tailor")
- Katsunosuke Hori - Bluebeard (in "Bluebeard")
- Kazuo Oka - Minister (in "The Grave Mound")
- Kazuyo Aoki - Cat (in "Old Sultan")
- Keiichi Nanba - Fourth Brother (in "The Six Swans")
- Keiko Han - Princess (in "Bluebeard")
- Keiko Hanagata - Mother (in "Snow White and Rose Red")
- Kenichi Ono - Middle Brother (in "The Crystal Ball")
- Kimie Nakajima - Stepmother (in "Cinderella")
- Kumiko Takizawa - Mrs. Fox (in "The Marriage of Mrs. Fox")
- Machiko Washio - Witch (in "The Crystal Ball")
- Mami Koyama - Hansel (in "Hansel and Gretel")
- Masako Katsuki - Hanna (in "Beauty and the Beast")
- Masaru Ikeda - Sorcerer (in "Puss in Boots")
- Masashi Ebara - Devil (in "The Shoes that were Danced to Pieces")
- Mayumi Tanaka - Rudolf (in "Brother and Sister")
- Michie Tomizawa - Second Daughter (in "The Shoes that were Danced to Pieces")
- Miho Yoshida - Helen (in "Beauty and the Beast")
- Miki Itō - Princess (in "Godfather Death")
- Nobuo Tobita - Youngest Prince (in "Snow White and Rose Red")
- Norio Wakamoto - Wren (in "The Wren and The Bear")
- Nozomu Sasaki - Klaus (in "Snow White")
- Osamu Kato - Head Thief (in "The Travelling Musicians of Bremen")
- Rihoko Yoshida - Nymph (in "The Water Nixie")
- Ryūji Saikachi - Old Woodman (in "The Golden Goose")
- Sakiko Tamagawa - Snow White (in "Snow White")
- Shōzō Iizuka - King of Hell (in "The Naughty Spirit")
- Shinji Ogawa - Soldier (in "The Six Who Went Far in the World")
- Sho Saito - Queen (in "Cinderella")
- Show Hayami - Prince (in "The Coat of Many Colours")
- Shunsuke Shima - Father (in "Hansel and Gretel")
- Shunsuke Takamiya - Soldier (in "The Brave Little Tailor")
- Sumi Shimamoto - Princess Elena (in "King Thrushbeard")
- Takeo Ono - Minister (in "The Golden Goose")
- Terue Nunami - Grandmother (in "Little Red Riding Hood")
- Tomie Kataoka - Witch Sister (in "Briar Rose")
- Toshiharu Sakurai - Third Brother (in "The Four Skillful Brothers")
- Toshio Furukawa - Owl/Prince (in "The Old Woman in the Woods")
- Toshiya Ueda - Dwarf (in "Snow White")
- Unshō Ishizuka - King (in "The Six Swans")
- Yoshino Takamori - Princess (in "The Frog Prince")
- Yōsuke Akimoto - Knight (in "The Water of Life")
- Yuu Shimaka - Powerful (in "The Six Who Went Far in the World")
- Yukimasa Kishino - Devil (in "The Naughty Spirit")
- Yukimasa Natori - Farmer (in "Godfather Death")
- Yumiko Shibata - Child (in "The Grave Mound")
- Yuriko Yamamoto - Rosa (in "Brother and Sister")

=== English cast ===
- Theodore Lehmann - Narrator
- Stephen Apostolina - Chamberlain (in "The Coat of Many Colors"), George (in "The Four Skillful Brothers"), Tailor (in "The Brave Little Tailor")
- Robert Axelrod - Rooster (in "The Traveling Musicians of Bremen"), Hunter (in "The Six Who Went Too Far"), Bluebeard's Herald (in "Bluebeard"), Messenger (in "The Worn Out Dancing Shoes"), Prince and Messenger (in "The Worn Out Dancing Shoes"), Hare (in "The Hare and the Hedgehog")
- Arlene Banas - Little Red Riding Hood's Mother (in "Little Red Riding Hood"), Snow-White and Rose-Red's Mother (in "Snow White & Rose Red"), Evil Queen (in "Snow White"), Mother Holle (in "Mother Holle")
- Robert V. Barron - Shoemaker, Guards, Sorcerer and Peasants (in "Puss in Boots"), Farmer (in "The Six Who Went Too Far"), Nobleman (in "The Worn-Out Dancing Shoes"), Mr. Fox (in "The Wedding of Mrs. Fox"), Florist (in "Beauty and the Beast"), Old Man (in "The Magic Heart"), Servant (in "Brother and Sister"), Miller: Gretchen's Father (in "Rumpelstiltskin")
- Bill Capizzi - Cook (in "King Grizzlebeard"), Rabbit (in "Mother Holle"), Soldier (in "Brother and Sister"), King (in "The Iron Stove"), Crab (in "The Hare and the Hedgehog"), Cook (in "The Man of Iron"), Rumpelstiltskin (in "Rumpelstiltskin")
- Frank Catalano - Prince Alexander (in "The Coat of Many Colors")
- Ardwight Chamberlain - Franz (in "The Four Skillful Brothers"), Johan (in "Bearskin")
- Louise Chamis - Peasant's Wife (in "The Traveling Musicians of Bremen")
- Cheryl Chase
- Tony Clay - Enchanted Tree (in "Cinderella")
- Lara Cody - Jorinde (in "Jorinde and Joringel"), Princess Briar Rose (in "Briar Rose"), Cinderella (in "Cinderella"), Maria (in "Beauty and the Beast"), Rapunzel (in "Rapunzel"), Hildegard (in "Mother Holle"), Princess (in "The Six Swans"), Rudolf (in "Brother and Sister"), Chambermaid (in "The Iron Stove")
- Mari Devon - Servant (in "Bluebeard"), Nixie (in "The Water Nixie")
- Richard Epcar - Frosty (in "The Six Who Went Too Far"), Young Man (in "The Six Who Went Too Far"), Evil Spirit (in "The Water of Life"), King Turner (in "King Grizzlebeard"), Demon #2 (in "The Worn-Out Dancing Shoes"), Villagers (in "The Worn-Out Dancing Shoes"), Guard and Woodcutter (in "Cinderella"), Guards (in "The Iron Stove"), Iron Hans (in "The Man of Iron"), Blacksmith (in "The Man of Iron"), Soldier (in "The Brave Little Tailor")
- Michael Forest - King (in "The Six Who Went Too Far"), Farmer (in "Old Sultan"), Beast (in "Beauty and the Beast"), King (in "The Four Skillful Brothers"), John the Woodcutter (in "The Spirit in the Bottle"), King (in "The Man of Iron"), Death (in "The Godfather of Death")
- Rebecca Forstadt - Gretel (in "Hansel and Gretel"), Rose-Red (in "Snow White & Rose Red"), Princess Louise (in "The Worn-Out Dancing Shoes"), Hanna (in "Beauty and the Beast"), Rosa (in "Brother and Sister"), Little Girl (in "The Wren and the Bear")
- Eddie Frierson - Speedy (in "The Six Who Went Too Far"), Peter (in "The Worn-Out Dancing Shoes"), Algernon (in "Cinderella"), Prince William (in "The Iron Stove")
- Barbara Goodson - Helga's Sisters (in "The Golden Goose"), Farmer's Wife (in "Old Sultan"), Madam Pompadour (in "Cinderella"), Mrs. Fox (in "The Wedding of Mrs. Fox"), Elaine (in "Mother Holle"), Mrs. Hedgehog (in "The Hare and the Hedgehog"), Queen (in "The Man of Iron")
- Melora Harte - Good Witches (in "Briar Rose"), Lily (in "The Wedding of Mrs. Fox"), Mosquito (in "The Wren and the Bear")
- Milton James - Donkey (in "The Traveling Musicians of Bremen"), King's Chamberlain (in "The Six Who Went Too Far"), King (in "King Grizzlebeard"), Devil (in "The Faithful Watchman"), Frogs (in "The Iron Stove"), Demon (in "Bearskin")
- Alexandra Kenworthy - Queen (in "Cinderella")
- Steve Kramer - Lead Thief (in "The Traveling Musicians of Bremen"), Father (in "Hansel and Gretel"), Henry (in "The Frog Prince"), Big Bad Wolf (in "Little Red Riding Hood"), Priest ("in "The Golden Goose"), Guard (in "The Golden Goose"), Puss in Boots (in "Puss in Boots"), Army General (in "The Six Who Went Too Far"), Subject (in "The Water of Life"), Old Cat (in "Old Sultan"), Customer (in "King Grizzlebeard"), George (in "The Crystal Ball"), Devil (in "The Wedding of Mrs. Fox"), Shopkeeper (in "The Wedding of Mrs. Fox"), Priest (in "The Faithful Watchman"), Wolf (in "The Wolf and The Fox"), Prince #4 (in "The Six Swans"), Servant (in "The Six Swans"), Cook (in "The Coat of Many Colors"), Hedgehog (in "The Hedgehog and the Hare"), Fisherman (in "The Man of Iron"), Soldier (in "The Brave Little Tailor"), Captain (in "The Brave Little Tailor"), Villager (in "Rumpelstiltskin"), King (in "The Godfather of Death")
- Christina Lange - Little Red Riding Hood (in "Little Red Riding Hood")
- Doug Lee - Magic Mirror (in "Snow White")
- Wendee Lee - Princess Leonora (in "The Frog Prince"), Helga (in "The Golden Goose"), Princess Genevieve (in "The Worn-Out Dancing Shoes"), Christina (in "Bearskin")
- Morgan Lofting - Good Witch (in "Briar Rose")
- Julie Maddalena - Snow-White (in "Snow White & Rose Red"), Snow White (in "Snow White"), Princess Julia (in "The Worn-Out Dancing Shoes"), Princess (in "The Four Skillful Brothers"), Princess (in "The Iron Stove"), Princess (in "The Brave Little Tailor"), Heidi (in "The Water Nixie")
- Melanie MacQueen
- Kerrigan Mahan - Peasant (in "The Traveling Musicians of Bremen"), Hunter (in "Little Red Riding Hood"), Monday (in "Snow White"), Prince Franz (in "The Water of Life"), Boar (in "Old Sultan"), Ichabod (in "The Naughty Spirit"), Demon #1 (in "The Worn-Out Dancing Shoes"), Three-Tailed Fox (in "The Wedding of Mrs. Fox"), Goblin Bandit (in "The Old Woman in the Woods"), First Prince (in "The Six Swans"), Other Lumberjack (in "The Spirit in the Bottle"), Fox (in "The Hare and the Hedgehog"), King Wren (in "The Wren and the Bear"), Sean (in "The Water Nixie")
- Dave Mallow - Guards (in "Puss in Boots"), Bear/Prince (in "Snow White & Rose Red"), Hero (in "The Six Who Went Too Far"), Chemist (in "The Water of Life"), Brother #3 (in "Bluebeard"), Prince (in "Briar Rose"), King Grizzlebeard (in "King Grizzlebeard"), Musician (in "King Grizzlebeard"), Demons (in "The Naughty Spirit"), Hank the One-Tailed Fox (in "The Wedding of Mrs. Fox"), Owl/Prince (in "The Old Woman in the Woods"), Peasant (in "The Faithful Watchman"), Watchman (in "The Faithful Watchman"), Fox (in "The Wolf and the Fox"), Hans the Rooser (in "Mother Holle"), King (in "Brother and Sister"), Wilhelm (in "The Four Skillful Brothers"), Other Lumberjack's Son (in The Spirit in the Bottle"), Fox (in "The Wren and the Bear"), Crow (in "The Wren and the Bear"), Wren Prince (in "The Wren and the Bear")
- Edward Mannix - King (in "The Golden Goose"), Saturday (in "Snow White"), Market Man (in "King Grizzlebeard"), Maria's Father (in "Beauty and the Beast")
- Michael McConnohie - Cat (in "The Traveling Musicians of Bremen"), Dog (in "The Frog Prince"), Woodcutter (in "Little Red Riding Hood"), King (in "The Six Swans"), King (in "Brother and Sister"), Trader (in "The Spirit in the Bottle"), Innkeeper (in "Bearskin"), General Bear (in "The Wren and the Bear"), Spirit of Justice (in "The Godfather of Death")
- Lisa Michelson - Nana Doris (in "Snow White"), Josephine (in "Bluebeard"), Princess Alea (in "The Coat of Many Colors")
- Edie Mirman - Witch (in "Hansel and Gretel"), Queen (in "The Frog Prince"), Little Red Riding Hood's Grandmother and Mrs. Merryweather (in "Little Red Riding Hood"), Evil Witch (in "Briar Rose"), Old Woman (in "King Grizzlebeard"), Grizelda (in "Cinderella"), Witch (in "The Crystal Ball"), Helen (in "Beauty and the Beast"), Witch (in "The Magic Heart"), Witch (in "The Old Woman in the Woods"), Stepmother (in "Mother Holle"), Nanny (in "Brother and Sister"), Gisella (in "Bearskin"), Grandma (in "The Wren and the Bear"), Old Woman (in "The Water Nixie")
- Tony Oliver - Altar Boy (in "The Golden Goose"), Klaus (in "Snow White"), Prince Joseph (in "The Water of Life"), Prince (in "Cinderella"), Sebastian (in "The Crystal Ball"), Four-Tailed Fox (in "The Wedding of Mrs. Fox"), Deer (in "The Wolf and the Fox"), Prince (in "The Six Swans")
- Simon Prescott - King Bartholomew (in "The Frog Prince"), Bluebeard (in "Bluebeard"), King (in "Briar Rose"), King (in "The Worn-Out Dancing Shoes")
- Mike Reynolds - King (in "Puss in Boots"), The Huntsman (in "Snow White"), Army General (in "The Six Who Went Too Far"), Old Wolf (in "Old Sultan"), Beelzebub (in "The Naughty Spirit"), King (in "Cinderella"), Goblin Bandit #4 (in "The Old Woman in the Woods"), Landlord (in "The Faithful Watchman"), Old King (in "The Coat of Many Colors"), Giant (in "The Brave Little Tailor"), Wolf (in "The Wren and the Bear"), Chamberlain (in "Rumpelstiltskin")
- Ron Rolek - Hansel (in "Hansel and Gretel"), Max (in "Puss in Boots"), Joringel (in "Jorinde and Joringel"), Nicholas (in "The Naughty Spirit"), Peter (in "The Four Skillful Brothers"), Frederick (in "Spirit in the Bottle"), Junior (in "The Hare and the Hedgehog"), Doctor (in "The Godfather of Death")
- Philece Sampler - Helga's Sisters (in "The Golden Goose")
- Brianne Siddall - Princess (in "The Golden Goose"), Princess Anna (in "The Water of Life"), Rapunzel's Son (in "Rapunzel"), Lisbeth (in "The Old Woman in the Woods"), Child #1 (in "The Hare and the Hedgehog"), Wren Prince (in "The Wren and the Bear"), Young Sean (in "The Water Nixie")
- Michael Sorich - Dog (in "The Traveling Musicians of Bremen"), Friday (in "Snow White"), Muscles (in "The Six Who Went Too Far"), Old Woodsman (in "The Water of Life"), Brother #1 (in "Bluebeard"), Old Man (in "Jorinde and Joringel"), Second Prince (in "The Six Swans"), Frogs (in "The Iron Stove"), Farmer (in "The Man of Iron"), General #2 (in "The Brave Little Tailor")
- Melodee Spevack - Peasant's Wife (in "The Faithful Watchman"), Evil Queen (in "The Six Swans")
- Marbry Steward - Princess Elena (in "King Grizzlebeard"), Gwendolyn (in "Cinderella")
- Barry Stigler - Tuesday (in "Snow White"), Puffer (in "The Six Who Went Too Far"), Brother #2 (in "Bluebeard")
- Doug Stone - Waiter (in "King Grizzlebeard"), King Franz (in "King Grizzlebeard"), Caleb (in "The Naughty Spirit"), Brave Soldier (in "The Faithful Watchman"), Anton (in "The Crystal Ball"), Simon (in "The Coat of Many Colors"), Knight (in "The Four Skillful Brothers"), Guards (in "The Iron Stove"), Prince William (in "The Man of Iron")
- Kirk Thornton - Rapunzel's Father (in "Rapunzel"), General #1 (in "The Brave Little Tailor")
- Clifton Wells - Sunday (in "Snow White"), Hans Müller (in "Bearskin"), Miller (in "The Water Nixie")
- Jeff Winkless - Lackey (in "The Traveling Musicians of Bremen"), The Old Man (in "The Golden Goose"), Innkeeper (in "Puss in Boots"), Gnome (in "Snow White & Rose Red"), Thursday (in "Snow White"), North Wind (in "The Water of Life"), Knight (in "Briar Rose"), Old Sultan (in "Old Sultan"), Captain (in "The Naughty Spirit"), Demons (in "The Naughty Spirit"), Miller (in "The Magic Heart"), Father (in "The Four Skillful Brothers"), Old Samuel (in "The Hare and the Hedgehog"), Farmer and Butler (in "The Godfather of Death")
- Dan Woren - The Frog Prince (in "The Frog Prince"), Hans (in "The Golden Goose"), Prince (in "Snow White"), Two-Tailed Fox (in "The Wedding of Mrs. Fox"), Prince (in "Beauty and the Beast"), Soldier (in "The Brave Little Tailor"), King (in "Rumpelstiltskin")
- Tom Wyner - Hans' Father (in "The Golden Goose"), Pharmacist (in "The Golden Goose"), Wednesday (in "Snow White"), King (in "The Six Who Went Too Far"), The King, Chamberlain and Knight (in "The Water of Life"), Attendant (in "Briar Rose"), High Dudgeon (in "The Naughty Spirit"), Ignatz (in "Cinderella"), Lord Ox (in "The Crystal Ball"), Spirit in the Bottle (in "The Spirit in the Bottle"), King (in "The Brave Little Tailor")

== Music ==
In Japan, for both seasons, the series used two theme songs; the opening theme, "The Rainbow Bridge" (虹の橋, Niji no Hashi), and the ending theme, "My Town's Merry-Go-Round" (私の町はメリーゴーランド, Watashi no Machi wa Merī Gorando), were both performed by Ushio Hashimoto. Incidental music used in the Japanese version was composed by Hideo Shimazu. The theme tune and incidental music used in the English dub were both composed by Haim Saban and Shuki Levy. Most of the incidental music was in fact recycled from the earlier VHS series My Favorite Fairy Tales.

== Releases ==
Title in the English Saban version

Title in the alternate English version

Limited episodes were produced in NTSC VHS by Saban International and distributed by Starmaker Entertainment Inc. and Hi-Tops Video/Fisher-Price in 1990 and Video Treasures/HGV Video Productions in 1992. Those volumes included:

- Beauty and the Beast (UPC: 0-1313-29408-3)
- The Six Who Went Far (UPC: 0-90251-94073-6)
- Hansel & Gretel (UPC: 0-92091-4105-3)
- Briar Rose
- Brother & Sister
- The Coat of Many Colors
- Jorinda and Joringel
- King Grizzlebeard
- Marriage of Mrs. Fox
- Mother Holle
- Old Sultan
- The Spirit in the Bottle
- The Frog Prince
- The Man of Iron
- The Secret Heart
- The Six Swans
- The Water of Life
- Grimm Brothers' Scary Fairy Tales
- Snow White
- Cinderella
- Rumpelstiltskin (UPC: 0-1313-29403-3)

A few episodes were released to a single Region 2 DVD titled "Grimm's Fairy Tale Classics - Volume One" under distribution by Fox Kids and Maximum Entertainment in 2004. The episodes included were:

- Hansel and Gretel
- Little Red Riding Hood
- The Golden Goose
- Snow White And Rose Red
- Beauty and the Beast

The British newspapers Daily Mirror and Sunday Mirror released the following episodes on promotional DVDs:

- Snow White
- Bluebeard
- The Frog Prince
- Rapunzel
- Rumpelstiltskin
- Cinderella
- Beauty and the Beast
- Puss N' Boots
- Little Red Riding Hood
- The Golden Goose
- Hansel and Gretel

The original Japanese version of the series was released as a 5-disc DVD set in Region 2 with 10 episodes from the series.

Despite a large cult following, none of the English dub were released on DVD in Region 1 for many years and only limited episodes (listed above) were released in Region 2. The rights to the English dub (owned by The Walt Disney Company following their purchase of Fox Family Worldwide in 2001) reverted to Nippon Animation in July 2005 (series 1) and March 2006 (series 2).

Discotek Media acquired the rights to release the series on SD-BD. The first volume was released on May 25, 2021, and the second volume was released on August 31 the same year. The releases included both the original Japanese versions of the episodes, along with the English dubs by Saban Entertainment, reconstructed using video from the Japanese version and audio from the dub masters. The Season 1 release included alternative English versions of The Travelling Musicians of Bremen, Bluebeard, and The Naughty Spirit. The Season 2 release included the English versions of The Crystal Ball, The Marriage of Mrs. Fox, The Old Woman in the Woods, The Faithful Watchmen, Mother Holle, The Six Swans, The Spirit in the Bottle, The Iron Stove, The Water Nixie, and The Godfather of Death, which had never aired in North America. The Season 1 episode The Six Who Went Far is incorrectly titled The Six Who Went Too Far in the Discotek release.

Season 1 of the English dub is available on Amazon Prime Video in the USA.

== Title translations ==
- Baśnie Braci Grimm (Polish title)
- Cuentos de los hermanos Grimm (Spanish title) (Latin America only)
- Videocuentos Infantiles (Spanish title) (Spain only)
- Soñar con los ojos abiertos (Spanish title) (Spain only)
- Grimm Masterpiece Theater (English title)
- Grimm Meisaku Gekijō (Japanese title)
- Grimm's Fairy Tale Classics (English title)
- Le Fiabe son Fantasia (Italian title)
- Raconte moi une Histoire (French title)
- فى جعبتى حكاية (Arabic title)
- グリム名作劇場 (Japanese title)
- 格林童話劇場 (Chinese title)
- Grimm legszebb meséi (Hungarian title)
- Grimms Märchen (German title)
- Os Teus Contos Clássicos (Portuguese title) (never been released on TV, but only on DVD and VHS)
- Бајке браће Грим (Serbian title)
- אגדות האחים גרים (Hebrew title)
- Сказки братьев Гримм (Russian title)
- Приказките на Братя Грим (Bulgarian title)
- Aka-uka Grimm ertaklari (Uzbek title)
- Grimmove pravljice (Slovenian title)
- Grimmove bajke (Croatian title)
- Pohádky bratří Grimmů (Czech title)
