= The Emperor's New Clothes (disambiguation) =

"The Emperor's New Clothes" is a Danish fairy tale written by Hans Christian Andersen, first published in 1837.

The Emperor's New Clothes may also refer to:

== Films ==
- The Emperor's New Clothes (1961 film), a Croatian fantasy directed by Ante Babaja
- The Emperor's New Clothes (1966 film), an American short film written and directed by Bob Clark
- Hans Christian Andersen's The Emperor's New Clothes, a Rankin/Bass program starring Danny Kaye
- The Emperor's New Clothes (1987 film), a 1987 musical comedy adaptation of the fairy tale starring Sid Caesar, part of the Cannon Movie Tales series
- The Emperor's New Clothes (1991 film), an Australian animated film produced by Burbank Animation Studios
- The Emperor's New Clothes (2001 film), a British drama starring Ian Holm as Napoleon Bonaparte
- The Emperor's New Clothes (2015 film), a documentary by Michael Winterbottom and Russell Brand

== Music ==
- The Emperor's New Clothes, a 2007 album by Klute
- "The Emperor's New Clothes", a song by Every Time I Die from their 2000 EP The Burial Plot Bidding War
- "The Emperor's New Clothes", a song by Vince Gill
- "The Emperor's New Clothes", a song by Elton John from his 2001 album Songs from the West Coast
- "The Emperor's New Clothes" (song), by Sinéad O'Connor from her 1990 album I Do Not Want What I Haven't Got
- "Emperor's New Clothes" (song), by Panic! at the Disco from their 2016 album Death of a Bachelor
- "Emperor's New Clothes", a song by Poison from their 2002 album Hollyweird
- The Emperor's New Clothes (Raekwon album), a 2025 album by Raekwon

== See also ==
- The Emperor Wears No Clothes, a non-fiction book about cannabis
