= Wolves, Witches and Giants =

- Genre: Animation; Fantasy
- Written by: Ed Welch
- Directed by: Sara Bor; Simon Bor
- Narrated by: Spike Milligan
- Composer: Ed Welch
- Country of origin: United Kingdom
- Original language: English
- No. of series: 4
- No. of episodes: 53

Production
- Executive producer: John Marsden
- Running time: 9 minutes
- Production company: Honeycomb Animation

Original release
- Network: ITV (CITV)
- Release: 9 October 1995 – 21 October 1998

Wolves, Witches and Giants, narrated by Spike Milligan, is a children's animated series of humorous adaptations of classic fairy tales, featuring a collection of villains including the wily wolf, a wicked witch and a ginormous giant. It was written by musician Ed Welch, based on an LP, also performed by Milligan. The directors and producers were Simon & Sara Bor of Honeycomb Animation. There were 4 series of 13 episodes and 3 specials produced for ITV from 1995 to 1999. Reruns ran on Discovery Kids until its defunct in 2007 and later, on CITV from July 2005.

It included adaptations of many tales such as Little Red Riding Hood, Sleeping Beauty, Hansel and Gretel, Cinderella, and Three Billy Goats Gruff.

It was made by the same producers that made the original Grizzly Tales for Gruesome Kids (and its new series), Tube Mice, Binka, and Funky Valley.

Although being based in Medieval times, it has featured some modern equipment, such as the Wily Wolf driving a blue sports car, a tailor playing on a handheld game console, Little Red Riding Hood's bed-ridden grandmother watching an Australian soap on her TV, or the Wicked Witch using a microwave.

All the series was animated in hand-drawn cel animation, but the title sequence itself from the 4th series uses digital-ink-and-paint animation.

== Episode list ==
=== Series 1 ===
- Episode 1 The Wolf and the Seven Kids (9 October 1995) (UK exclusive)
- Episode 2 Hansel and Gretel (10 October 1995)
- Episode 3 Three Billy Goats Gruff (11 October 1995)
- Episode 4 Little Red Riding Hood (12 October 1995)
- Episode 5 The Sleeping Beauty (13 October 1995)
- Episode 6 The Little Tailor (16 October 1995)
- Episode 7 The Little Red Hen (17 October 1995)
- Episode 8 Rapunzel (18 October 1995)
- Episode 9 Jack and the Beanstalk (19 October 1995)
- Episode 10 The Three Little Pigs (20 October 1995)
- Episode 11 The Witch and the Comb (23 October 1995) (UK exclusive)
- Episode 12 The Giant with the Golden Hair (24 October 1995) (UK exclusive)
- Episode 13 Peter and the Wolf (25 October 1995)

=== Series 2 ===
- Episode 1 Goldilocks (7 October 1996)
- Episode 2 The Little Mermaid (8 October 1996)
- Episode 3 Puss in Boots (9 October 1996)
- Episode 4 The Wolf and the Fox (10 October 1996) (UK exclusive)
- Episode 5 The Witch and the Mill (11 October 1996) (UK exclusive)
- Episode 6 Chicken Lickin (14 October 1996)
- Episode 7 The Giant and the Apprentice (15 October 1996) (UK exclusive)
- Episode 8 Billy's Halloween (16 October 1996) (UK exclusive)
- Episode 9 The Wolf and the Horse (17 October 1996) UK exclusive)
- Episode 10 Sweet and Sour (18 October 1996) (UK exclusive)
- Episode 11 The Snow Queen (21 October 1996)
- Episode 12 Beauty and the Beast (22 October 1996)
- Episode 13 The Little Snow Girl (23 October 1996) (UK exclusive)

=== Special ===
- Cinderella (25 December 1996)

=== Series 3 ===
- Episode 1 The Emperor's New Clothes (6 October 1997)
- Episode 2 Dick Whittington (7 October 1997)
- Episode 3 The Giant Who Had Nothing At All (8 October 1997) (UK exclusive)
- Episode 4 The Four Musicians of Brum (9 October 1997)
- Episode 5 The Witch Who Stole a Prince (10 October 1997) (UK exclusive)
- Episode 6 Hercules and the Giant (13 October 1997) (UK exclusive)
- Episode 7 The Wolf in Sheep's Clothing (14 October 1997) (UK exclusive)
- Episode 8 The Three Wishes (15 October 1997)
- Episode 9 The Giant who Sucked his Thumb (16 October 1997) (UK exclusive)
- Episode 10 Tom Thumb (17 October 1997)
- Episode 11 The Matchbox (20 October 1997) (UK exclusive)
- Episode 12 The Giant Who Put Out the Sun (21 October 1997) (UK exclusive)
- Episode 13 The Frog Prince (22 October 1997)

=== Special ===
- Snow White (25 December 1997)

=== Series 4 ===
- Episode 1 The Hunchback of Nottingham (5 October 1998) (UK exclusive)
- Episode 2 The Elves and the Shoemaker (6 October 1998)
- Episode 3 The Ugly Duckling (7 October 1998)
- Episode 4 Jack the Giant Killer (8 October 1998) (UK exclusive)
- Episode 5 The Princess and the Pea (9 October 1998)
- Episode 6 Babes in the Wood (12 October 1998) (UK exclusive)
- Episode 7 Diamonds and Toads (13 October 1998) (UK exclusive)
- Episode 8 Pinocchio (14 October 1998)
- Episode 9 Snow-White and Rose-Red (15 October 1998) (UK exclusive)
- Episode 10 Ali Baba and the Forty Thieves (16 October 1998)
- Episode 11 Molly and the Giant (19 October 1998) (UK exclusive)
- Episode 12 Tom Tit Tot (20 October 1998) (UK exclusive)
- Episode 13 Aladdin (21 October 1998)

=== Special ===
- Aladdin (1999, first broadcast on the German channel Pro 7; extended version of Season 4, Episode 13)
