= Kenzō Okuzaki =

Japanese veteran and actor (1920–2005)

- 奥崎謙三
- Born: 1 February 1920; Akashi, Hyōgo, Empire of Japan
- Died: 16 June 2005 (aged 85); Kobe, Hyōgo, Japan
- Occupations: Soldier, writer, actor
- Employer: Imperial Japanese Army
- Known for: The Emperor's Naked Army Marches On
- Spouse: Shizumi Okuzaki

Kenzō Okuzaki (Japanese: 奥崎 謙三, Hepburn: Okuzaki Kenzō; 1 February 1920 – 16 June 2005) was a former Imperial Japanese Army soldier, writer, actor, anti-monarchist and anarchist. He was known for an attempted assault on Emperor Shōwa, and his starring role in the documentary The Emperor's Naked Army Marches On (1987).

== Biography ==
Kenzō Okuzaki was born on 1 February 1920 in Akashi, Hyōgo Prefecture to Shunzaburo Okuzaki (奥崎 俊三郎, Okuzaki Shunzaburo) and Waga (和賀). His family was affected by the Great Depression, and Okuzaki, after graduating elementary school in 1930, began working odd jobs at age 10. During this time, he became interested in Christianity.

=== Military service ===
In March 1941, Okuzaki was drafted into the Engineering Corps in Okayama, and was sent to Jiujiang in China for construction duties as well as occasional combat against Chinese troops. In January 1943, Okuzaki was transferred to 2nd Company, 36th Independent Engineering Regiment, and in the following month he was shipped to the naval base in Hansa Bay, in the Japanese-occupied Territory of New Guinea.

Okuzaki arrived at Hansa in April 1943, and his regiment was assigned to build an airfield at Alexishafen. Construction was completed within the following months, but the Japanese troops suffered from malaria and Allied bombing. In December, the troops abandoned the Alexishafen airfield and were ordered to retreat to Wewak, then further to Hollandia. During the retreat, which was described as a "long and desperate struggle for survival", Japanese troops were attacked by Allied forces, who were gaining foothold in the area.

Okuzaki was injured during the retreat and became greatly weakened. He became increasingly isolated from his fellow soldiers, both physically (Okuzaki was part of a reconnaissance patrol) and mentally, as he was noted to have "temperamental" and anti-authoritarian behavior. He reached Hollandia after 10 months, and decided to expose himself to the enemy so he could be killed, but he was captured by Allied troops instead. Okuzaki was one of the six survivors from his 1,200-men regiment to survive the retreat. Okuzaki and another man were the sole survivors of their 350-men company.

After his capture, Okuzaki spent the rest of the war as a prisoner of war in Australia. His final rank was private first class.

=== Post-war ===
After returning to Japan, Okuzaki continued to work in a series of odd jobs including as a coal miner and a factory worker. Eventually, Okuzaki found success selling car batteries, and in 1951 he opened a shop in Kobe where he sold car batteries and second-hand cars. In 1956, Okuzaki attacked and accidentally killed Nobuhara Kazuo (延原 一男, Kazuo Nobuhara), a con man who posed as a broker and made off with some of Okuzaki's investment. Okuzaki was arrested and charged with (intentional) murder. Okuzaki's lawyer advised him to plead guilty and express remorse in an attempt to lower the sentence, but Okuzaki refused, and received the maximum sentence of 10 years.

Okuzaki spent the next 10 years in solitary confinement in the Osaka Detention House, where he grew increasingly skeptical with Japan's legal and political system, as well as the Japanese monarchy's role in the post-war Japanese democracy. His political views grew to become a "mixture of utopian anarchism and a vaguely Christian religious idea." He participated in some activism while in prison, sending a telegram to the Minister of Justice asking for a suspension of capital punishment in Japan, attempting to argue in a legal action that the Japan Self-Defense Forces was unconstitutional and calling for the abolition of the monarchy.

=== Attempted attack on Emperor Shōwa ===
Okuzaki was released in August 1966, and continued his car batteries business. During this time, he began attaching banners to his business trucks. These included accusations of Emperor Shōwa being a war criminal, along with various antimilitarism and anti-authoritarian slogans. By December 1968, Okuzaki was contemplating a "non-violent" action against the Emperor to call attention to his cause. He devised a plan where he would fire pachinko pinballs at Emperor Shōwa, knowing that it would most likely miss or only lightly injure the Emperor. He then planned to be arrested, and he could eventually argue for Emperor Shōwa's war responsibility in court and for the abolition of the monarchy. Okuzaki reasoned that "killing Hirohito per se would not solve the problem", though "Hirohito deserves capital punishment for his crime of driving hundreds of thousands of Japanese men to their death in war" and that he would not mind killing the Emperor "if that would bring truly eternal peace, freedom, and happiness to us."

On 2 January 1969, during the New Year's public opening of the Tokyo Imperial Palace, Okuzaki fired three pachinko pinballs with a slingshot at Emperor Shōwa, who was standing 26.5 metres (87 ft) away from Okuzaki: all three missed the Emperor. Okuzaki then shouted "Yamazaki, Shoot the Emperor with a pistol!" in an attempt to attract the police. (Yamazaki being the name of one of his deceased comrades in New Guinea.) He then fired one more pinball towards Emperor Shōwa: the pinball again missed the Emperor. The policemen, despite Okuzaki's shout, was unable to identify the preparator in the crowd. Okuzaki then turned himself in to one of the policemen. It is not known if Emperor Shōwa or his family were immediately aware of the attack.

The media reacted quickly to the news, describing Okuzaki as a man who suffered from paranoid personality disorder and amnesia with a criminal record of murder. His wartime background and experiences was not mentioned by the national newspapers with the exception of the Mainichi Shimbun. Okuzaki was sent to a psychiatric hospital for 2 months, where he was deemed mentally capable of standing trial.

The trial began in January, 1970. It was the first trial under the new Japanese constitution to personally involve the Emperor. However, no victim testimony or affidavit was obtained from Emperor Shōwa. In fact, the name of the victim (Hirohito) was never identified, and only the term "Emperor" was used during the trial.

During the trial, Okuzaki argued that Article 1 of the Constitution of Japan, concerning the Emperor's role, is unconstitutional. He also requested to cross-examine Emperor Shōwa, but was denied by the court. On 8 June 1970, Okuzaki was sentenced to one and a half years of imprisonment. Both Okuzaki and the prosecutors' office, who was looking for additional imprisonment, appealed to the Tokyo High Court. On 7 October 1970, the court maintained the ruling of the first trial, though they considered Okuzaki's time spent in detention awaiting and during trial (one and a half year), allowing Okuzaki to be released immediately. Upon his release, he continued to appeal to the Supreme Court, though the appeal was dismissed on 1 April 1971.

=== Royal pornography incident ===
In 1976, Okuzaki made fliers with pornographic cartoons depicting Emperor Shōwa, and tossed them off roofs of department stores, for which he was once again arrested and imprisoned for one year and two months at the Tokyo Detention House.

While in prison, Okuzaki unsuccessfully ran in the 1977 House of Councillors election in the House of Councillors national district. He was released in April 1978. In 1980 he again unsuccessfully ran in the House of Councillors election in the same district. In 1983, he unsuccessfully ran in the general election in the Hyogo 1st district.

In 1981, Okuzaki was arrested for plotting to kill then-former Prime Minister Kakuei Tanaka, but he was later released without a charge.

=== The Emperor's Naked Army Marches On ===
Okuzaki was introduced to documentary filmmaker Kazuo Hara through director Shōhei Imamura. Between 1982 and 1983, Okuzaki starred in the documentary film The Emperor's Naked Army Marches On by Hara, where he investigated the fate of two of his fallen comrades during the New Guinea campaign. By the end of the film, it was implied that they were executed by officers because they refused to participate in group cannibalism.

In March 1983, after bribing Indonesian authorities (access to New Guinea was barred due to the Papua conflict), Okuzaki and the documentary crew travelled to New Guinea for filming. On their departure, the footage was confiscated by an Indonesian officer at the airport. Following their return to Japan, the crew contacted the Japanese Foreign Ministry and attempted to retrieve the footage. However, their efforts were dashed when, after Okuzaki's arrest (see below), the media reported that Okuzaki sent a threatening letter to the Indonesian President Suharto, and also considered killing the Indonesian consular officer.

The documentary ended with Okuzaki's attempt in late 1983 to kill Masao Muramoto (村本 政雄, Muramoto Masao), whose former and wartime last name was Koshimizu (古清水). Muramoto was a former colonel in the Imperial Japanese Army who allegedly ordered the men's deaths. Okuzaki ended up shooting and injuring the son of the commander, Kazunori Muramoto (村本 和憲, Muramoto Kazunori). Before the murder attempt, Okuzaki contacted Hara, asking if he would like to film the murder. Hara did not wish to film it and ignored Okuzaki's request, and the event is only depicted in the documentary through newspaper headlines. After several days on the run, Okuzaki turned himself to the police. After his arrest, Okuzaki confessed that he was thinking of killing four more people, and was eventually sentenced to 12 years in prison.

=== Later life ===
Okuzaki was released from the Fuchū Prison in August, 1997. His wife Shizumi (シズミ) had died in 1986 during his imprisonment, and thus Okuzaki lived alone in poor health. In August 2004, Okuzaki fainted in his apartment, and was hospitalized. He died on 16 June 2005 in a hospital in Kobe at age 85 from multiple organ dysfunction syndrome.

== Filmography ==
- 1987: The Emperor's Naked Army Marches On
- 1998: Kami-sama no Ui Yatsu (神様の愛い奴)

== Books ==
- Yamazaki, Shoot the Emperor with a Pistol! (ヤマザキ、天皇を撃て！, Yamazaki, Ten'nō o Ute) (1972) ISBN 4787787187
- The Alien Bible!? (宇宙人の聖書！？, Uchūbito no Seisho) (1976)
- To Kill Kakuei Tanaka, the Journal (田中角栄を殺すために記す, Tanaka Kakuei o Korosu tame ni Shirusu) (1981)
- Theory of Killing (殺人論, Satsujinron) (1983)
- The Emperor's Naked Army Marches On: Opinions (ゆきゆきて「神軍」の思想, Yuki Yukite Shingun no Shisō) (1987) ISBN 978-4787787170
- The Appeals of the Non-Citizen Kenzō Okuzaki (非国民奥崎謙三は訴える, Hikokumin Okuzaki Kenzō wa Uttaeru) (1988) ISBN 4787788140
- Statements of Kenzō Okuzaki, Prisoner (奥崎謙三服役囚考, Okuzaki Kenzō Fukuekishū Kō) (1995) ISBN 4787795147

== See also ==
- New Guinea campaign
- Assassination attempts on Hirohito
- Anti-monarchism in Japan
