= Extreme Private Eros: Love Song 1974 =

1974 Japanese documentary film

Extreme Private Eros: Love Story 1974
- Cover of the 2026 Blu-ray re-release of Extreme Private Eros by Second Run
- Directed by: Kazuo Hara
- Produced by: Sachiko Kobayashi
- Starring: Miyuki Takeda; Sachiko Kobayashi; Kazuo Hara
- Cinematography: Kazuo Hara
- Edited by: Jun Nabeshima
- Music by: Tokiko Kato
- Production company: Shisso Productions
- Distributed by: Shisso Productions
- Release date: 10 April 1974 (Japan)
- Running time: 93 minutes
- Country: Japan
- Language: Japanese

Extreme Private Eros: Love Song 1974 (Japanese: 極私的エロス 恋歌1974, Hepburn: Gokushiteki Erosu: Renka 1974) is a 1974 Japanese documentary film by director Kazuo Hara. The documentary centres on Hara's former partner, Miyuki Takeda, and follows her after she moves to Okinawa with their son, where she pursues relationships with a woman and later an American serviceman. The film documents Takeda's life as a single mother and feminist, as well as her pregnancy and eventual unassisted childbirth, while examining Hara's continuing relationship with her and his own position behind the camera.

== Summary ==
The film documents the relationship between director Kazuo Hara and his former partner Miyuki Takeda, an outspoken feminist with whom he has a son. After their relationship ends, Takeda moves with their child to Okinawa. Hara begins filming her, later explaining that the project provided a means of maintaining a connection with her following their separation.

Hara later returns to Okinawa accompanied by his new partner, Sachiko Kobayashi, who also serves as the film's producer and sound recordist. The encounter between Takeda and Kobayashi introduces another dimension to the relationships documented in the film, as Takeda openly discusses Hara and reacts critically to his new partner. Meanwhile, Takeda increasingly rejects conventional ideas about marriage and the family, spending time in communities composed largely of women and children and pursuing life as a single mother.

After becoming pregnant by an American serviceman, Takeda returns to Tokyo. The film culminates in her giving birth to a daughter without medical assistance in Hara's apartment, while Hara films the delivery and Kobayashi records the sound. Takeda subsequently continues raising her children outside a conventional family structure. Through Hara's continued presence in her life, the documentary also records the shifting relationship between filmmaker and subject, with Hara's personal involvement repeatedly becoming part of the events he is ostensibly observing.

== Production ==
Extreme Private Eros: Love Song 1974 was Kazuo Hara's second feature-length documentary following Goodbye CP (1972). Produced by Sachiko Kobayashi through Shisso Productions, it was shot by Hara in black-and-white on 16mm, with sound by Yukio Kubota, editing by Jun Nabeshima and music by Tokiko Kato.

Following her separation from Hara, Takeda became involved with the Japanese Women's Liberation movement and moved to Okinawa. Hara later recalled that Takeda proposed that he make a film about her activities there. He expected the project to involve her criticising him and their former relationship from a feminist perspective, and saw this confrontation as the basis for a new kind of documentary. Hara also acknowledged that, at the time of production, he remained attached to Takeda and that filmmaking provided a means of maintaining contact with her after their separation.

Kobayashi was instrumental in organising and financing the production. Following screenings of Goodbye CP, she sought to use its independent exhibition network to raise money for a new film concerned with women's liberation. She also became a participant in the documentary when Hara brought her to meet Takeda in Okinawa. Kobayashi later stressed that she already knew and admired Takeda independently of Hara, and that many of Hara's ideas about feminism had themselves originated with Takeda.

Hara's personal involvement became increasingly visible during filming. He later described the camera as an extension of his body, connecting his practice to contemporary Japanese discussions of the “camera as violence”. At one point, while filming Takeda with another man, Hara became overwhelmed by jealousy and handed the camera to a friend, resulting in footage of Hara himself crying. The National Film Archive of Japan has identified this willingness to implicate and provoke both filmmaker and subject as characteristic of the documentary method Hara was developing during this period.

Takeda also influenced what Hara filmed. Most notably, after deciding to give birth without medical assistance, she asked him to record the delivery. Hara later said that he understood her request as a desire to see herself undergoing an experience that she could not observe directly. Scholar Wakae Nakane has subsequently used Takeda and Kobayashi's involvement in the production to challenge the idea of Hara as the film's sole author, arguing for the women's agency in shaping both the filmmaking process and their representation within it.

The childbirth footage caused difficulties with Japanese censorship because of its explicit imagery. Hara later recalled that the image accidentally went out of focus as the baby's head emerged, which helped the sequence remain in the finished film, although pressure was placed on some cinemas considering showing it. He also recalled relying initially on private screenings to recover the film's production costs.

== Themes and style ==
The film’s intensely personal approach has attracted considerable critical and scholarly attention, particularly for its treatment of feminism, sexuality, documentary authorship, and the relationship between private experience and political life.

=== Feminism and the private ===
Extreme Private Eros has been closely associated with the Japanese Women's Liberation movement (ūman ribu), in which Miyuki Takeda was involved. Film scholar Chika Kinoshita argues against interpreting the film's intensely personal subject matter as a retreat from politics: sex, pregnancy, abortion, childbirth and child-rearing were themselves political concerns within the Women's Liberation movement, challenging the conventional distinction between public politics and private experience.

Wakae Nakane similarly challenges interpretations that treat Hara as the film's sole author, arguing that Takeda and producer Sachiko Kobayashi exercise considerable agency over both the filmmaking process and their own representation. Nakane interprets their presentation as sexual, birthing and child-rearing bodies in relation to feminist resistance to conventional representations of women and social expectations surrounding the modern family.

=== Performance and spectatorship ===
Miyabi Goto argues that Extreme Private Eros "actively disturbs presumed boundaries" and foregrounds performance as a central element of documentary filmmaking. Rather than simply recording identities and relationships that exist independently of the camera, the film draws attention to how relationships between filmmaker, subject and spectator are constructed through documentary representation.

Goto focuses particularly on the still photographs at the beginning of the film, which establish the participants' previous familial relationships. She argues that the photographs also appear to return the spectator's gaze, implicating viewers in the act of observing an intensely private history. Motherhood and reproduction consequently become connected to the film's wider concern with the production and circulation of images.

=== Documentary authorship and ethics ===
The film's autobiographical structure destabilises the conventional distinction between filmmaker and subject. Hara's previous relationship with Takeda and his emotional responses are incorporated into the documentary rather than concealed to create an appearance of detached observation. Nakane argues that Takeda and Kobayashi's active participation further complicates Hara's authority, making it possible to understand the women as authors as well as documentary subjects.

Film scholar Markus Nornes similarly argues that Takeda is not simply an object of Hara's scrutiny. He places Extreme Private Eros within Hara's confrontational approach to documentary, in which subjects can challenge the filmmaker and influence the situations produced before the camera. Nornes also identifies the body as a recurring organising principle in Hara's early films, with sexuality, pregnancy and childbirth providing Extreme Private Eros with particularly extreme instances of bodily exposure. Jun Okada has further examined the film within the context of exploitation, art and politics, drawing attention to the tensions produced by Hara's provocative treatment of sexuality, gender and the body.

== Reception and legacy ==
On its Japanese release, Extreme Private Eros attracted attention for both Miyuki Takeda's presence and Hara's confrontational documentary method. Writing in Eiga Hyōron in 1974, filmmaker Katsumi Kanai described the film as a fierce challenge to the structures of the conventional family, praising Hara's willingness to expose himself and those closest to him before the camera.

Later critics have frequently focused on the tension between the film's extreme intimacy and Takeda's agency. Writing in the feminist film journal cléo, Ela Bittencourt interpreted the film as a record of Takeda's attempts to articulate her erotic desires and achieve individual autonomy, while also emphasising the discomfort produced by Hara's unresolved relationship with his former partner. The Village Voice critic Ed Halter similarly characterised the film as unexpectedly humanist and feminist despite initially appearing to be an exercise in masculine cruelty. Reviewing its 2026 Blu-ray release, Graham Williamson argued that the film continues to raise the fundamental documentary question of when a filmmaker should stop filming, while praising its record of changes in both its participants' lives and Japanese society.

Extreme Private Eros has been recognised as an important precursor to personal and self-reflexive documentary filmmaking. The Harvard Film Archive has described it as a “milestone in self-critical documentary”, while Markus Nornes places Hara's work within the development of the “action documentary”, in which the filmmaker's own relationship with the subject becomes part of the film.

Scholar Lúcia Nagib has similarly described Hara as a pioneer of the Japanese “private film”, arguing that Extreme Private Eros anticipated the later growth of first-person documentary by nearly two decades. The film's continuing recognition has included major Hara retrospectives and Blu-ray editions from the Criterion Collection in 2026.
