= The Wedding of Mrs. Fox =

German fairy tales

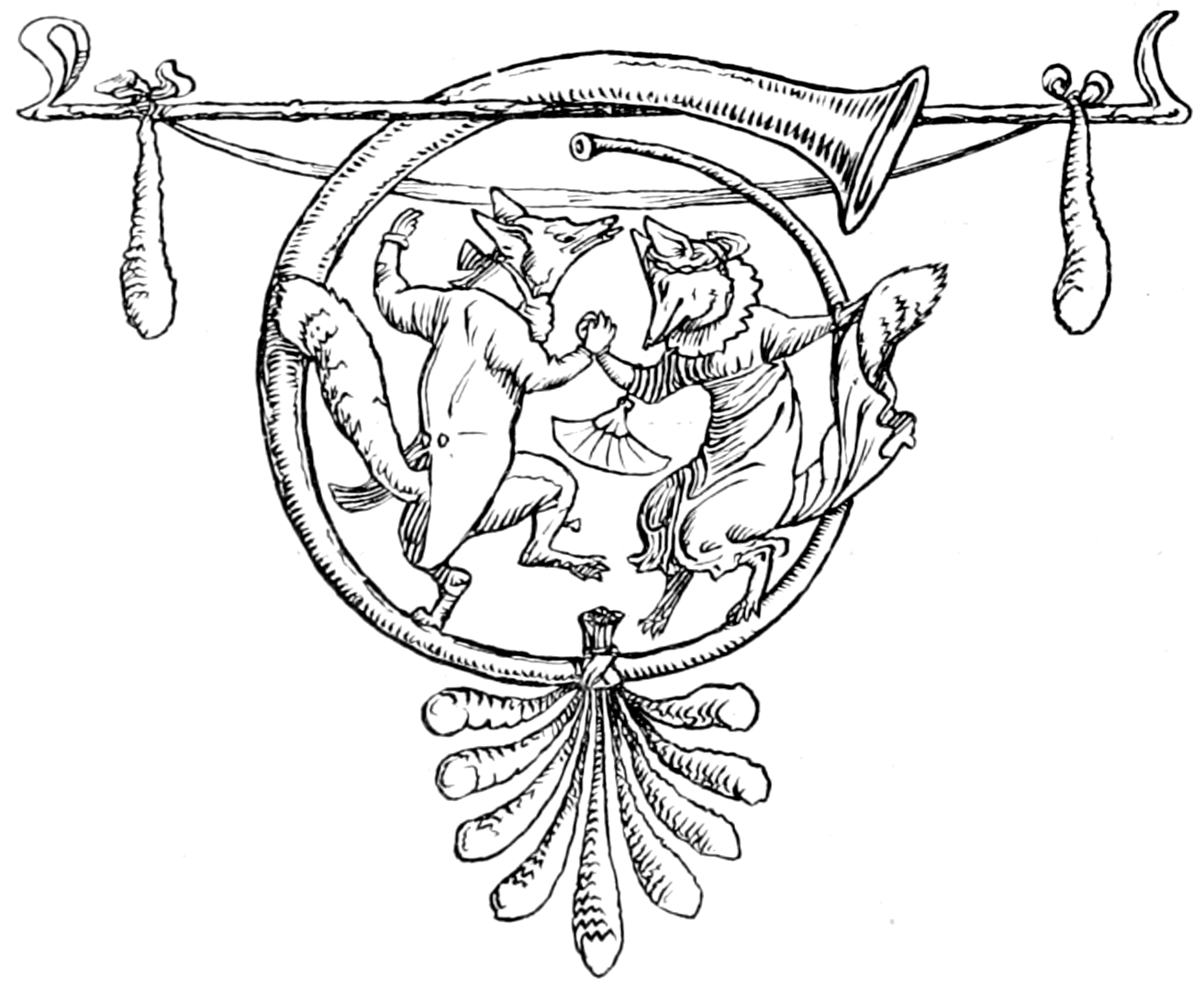
- Tailpiece illustration by Walter Crane, 1882.

Folk tale
- Name: The Wedding of Mrs. Fox
- Aarne–Thompson grouping: ATU 65, 1350, 1352, 1510
- Country: Germany
- Published in: Grimms' Fairy Tales

"The Wedding of Mrs. Fox" (German: Die Hochzeit der Frau Füchsin) refers to two German fairy tales collected under the same title by the Brothers Grimm in Grimm's Fairy Tales as number 38. It was included in all editions, and is classified as Aarne-Thompson type 65, 1350, 1352*, and 1510.

The second version of the tale was told to the Grimms by Ludovico Brentano Jordis, who also wrote down "The Lion and the Frog" for the brothers.

== Synopsis ==
In the first version of the story, Mr. Fox has nine tails and feigns his death to test his wife's loyalty. Mrs. Fox rejects all the fox suitors that have fewer than nine tails. When she gets engaged to another fox with nine tails, Mr. Fox arises and throws everyone out of his house, including his wife.

In the second version, Mr. Fox dies and Mrs. Fox is suited by a dog, a deer, a hare, a bear and a lion. She rejects all of them because they do not have red pants and a pointed face. When a fox arrives and meets her requirements, she agrees to marry him and laments her first husband's selfishness.

== Motifs ==
The Grimms used the word "Zeiselschwänze" for "tails" when Mrs. Fox asks about her potential suitors in the first version of the story. The root "schwanz" creates a double entendre as it is also used to describe male genitalia.

== In popular culture ==
"The Wedding of Mrs. Fox" is featured in episode 2 of season 2 of the Japanese anime TV series titled Grimm's Fairy Tale Classics. In this version, the wealthy nine-tailed Mr. Fox is convinced by another, devilish fox he encounters while fishing that his wife, Mrs. Fox is unfaithful. Because of that Mr. Fox grows paranoid and thinks every innocent thing she does is a sign of her cheating; however, he can't find any definitive proof pointing to that scenario. The devilish fox then suggests he should pretend that he has died. That way, Mr. Fox fools both his wife and their feline maid.

Mr. Fox's friend comes as a suitor for Mrs Fox, giving her flowers, but Mrs. Fox is too busy mourning her husband to remarry, so she tells the maid to send him away. However, when a second suitor appears, the maid realizes that they will become poor without anyone to provide for them. She convinces the still-mourning Mrs. Fox that she must find another spouse to prevent that. The "widow" agrees, but states that he must have nine tails like her "late" husband (since only then he'd be as beautiful as Mr. Fox).

Meanwhile, Mr. Fox continues to feign his own death, lying on the ground while fighting his growing hunger. He's also furious at his friend for trying to marry his wife, being under the impression Mr. Fox has died. Despite the suffering he also grows confident that his wife will remain faithful as she refuses more and more suitors. At the same time however, he feels bad for his wife for putting her through such a torment, but the devil keeps egging him on and convinces him not to stop pretending. Because of that decision soon, a wealthy, younger than Mr. Fox fox with nine tails appears and Mrs. Fox agrees to wed him, kissing him on Mr. Fox's eyes.

This causes an angry Mr. Fox to confront the nine tailed suitor, the maid and his wife. He angrily scolds all of them: his wife for cheating and the suitor for trying to get to her. Mrs. Fox, however, addresses that Mr. Fox was wrong to deceive his own wife in such a way, as she had been devoted to him through and through. She says she only chose the suitor as she thought Mr. Fox was dead and thought she would have to provide for herself. The maid also defends her mistress by attacking Mr. Fox, as he had always mistreated his housekeeper.

Mr. Fox violently chases them out of the house but realizes that he is now alone. The devilish fox is revealed to be the devil on his shoulder that makes one do bad deeds. In his anger Mr. Fox attacks his devilish self, unfortunately destroying his own house in the process and causing his definitive downfall.

Another re-write of this tale was published in the December 2025 edition of the Oxford Student Magazine The Turl, by Kyra Radley and Jess Hind.
