= The Emperor's Naked Army Marches On =

- Film poster
- Directed by: Kazuo Hara
- Produced by: Sachiko Kobayashi
- Starring: Kenzō Okuzaki
- Cinematography: Kazuo Hara
- Edited by: Jun Nabeshima
- Distributed by: Imamura Productions; Shisso Production; Zanzou-sha
- Release date: 1 August 1987 (Japan)
- Running time: 122 minutes
- Country: Japan
- Language: Japanese
- Budget: $222,000

The Emperor's Naked Army Marches On (Japanese: ゆきゆきて、神軍, Hepburn: Yuki yukite, shingun) (Note: The title is also translated as 'The Emperor's Army Marches On' or 'God's Army Marches On.' The title also puns on the callsign of Kenzō's 36th Division, which was called the Yuki Heidan ('snow division').) is a 1987 Japanese documentary film by director Kazuo Hara. The documentary centers on Kenzō Okuzaki, a 62-year-old veteran of Japan's campaign in New Guinea in the Second World War, and follows him around as he searches out those responsible for the unexplained deaths of two soldiers in his old unit.

== Summary ==
Okuzaki ultimately holds the Shōwa Emperor (Hirohito) accountable for all the suffering of the war, declaring "I hate irresponsible people ... the most cowardly man in Japan, is the Emperor." During his protests, he calls police "robots." He painstakingly tracks down former soldiers and officers, persuading them to disclose details about the deaths. His methods often involve verbal and occasional physical abuse, even injuring one individual to the point of bleeding. At one point, Okuzaki states that "Violence is my forte." The people he talks to give different accounts of what transpired almost 40 years earlier, some saying that those killed were executed for desertion after the war was already over, while others state that they were shot for cannibalizing Indigenous New Guineans.

At the end of the war, the Japanese garrison in New Guinea was crammed into a small area and almost completely cut off from food supplies, leading to starvation and eventually to cannibalism. According to confessions, indigenous people were euphemistically called "black pigs" while Allied soldiers were "white pigs"—although one of the interviewed says there was a ban on eating "white pigs". The sister of one of the executed at one point states her belief that the two (low-ranking privates) were killed so that the officers would have something to eat.

During the course of Okuzaki's investigation a captain named Koshimizu is said to have issued the order to execute the pair, with a couple of the interviewed also stating that he personally finished them off with his pistol after the firing squad failed to kill them outright, something the captain denies.

Okuzaki also discovers that there has been another suspicious death in his unit and seeks out a former sergeant who is the sole survivor of his regiment. After much coaxing and a physical altercation, the sergeant tells him that he personally killed a fellow soldier who had been stealing food and that the corpse was then eaten. He also states that the indigenous were not cannibalized as they were too quick to catch. Instead, Japanese soldiers were marked for death and cannibalized – "the immoral and selfish ones" first. The sergeant states that he only survived because he could make himself useful as a jungle guide, for instance finding fresh water for the other soldiers.

A title card states that the documentary crew and Okuzaki traveled to New Guinea but that the footage was confiscated by the Indonesian government.

An epilogue shows pictures of newspaper headlines where it is revealed that Okuzaki attempted to kill Koshimizu, whom he holds responsible for the deaths of the two soldiers. Not finding him at home Okuzaki settled for shooting Koshimizu's son, who was seriously wounded. It is then stated that Okuzaki was sentenced to 12 years of hard labor for attempted murder.

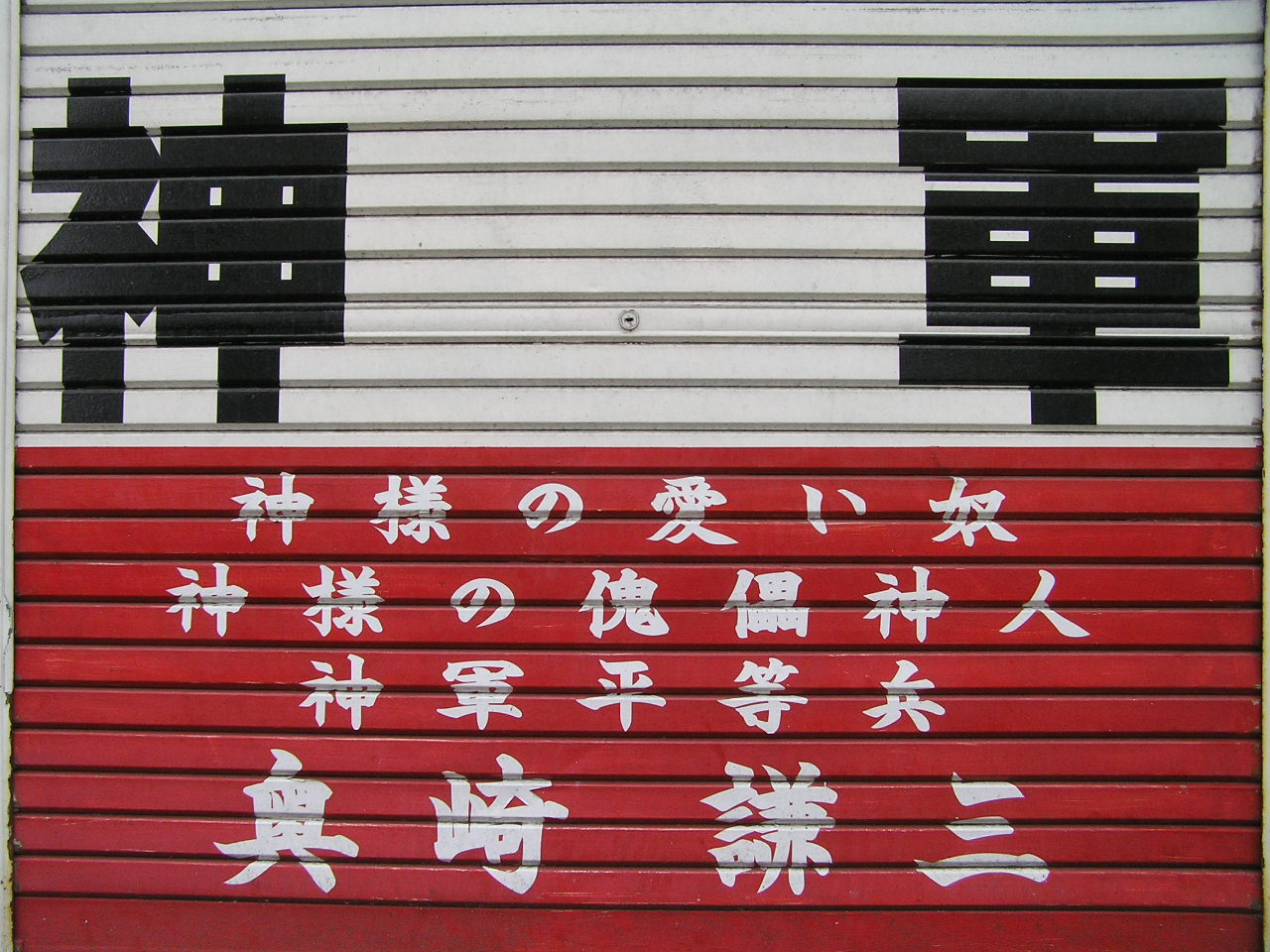
One of the methods of Okuzaki, as seen in the film, was to paint his car and home with political messages. Here is a picture of his carport.

== Awards and reception ==
The Emperor's Naked Army Marches On won numerous awards:

- Berlin International Film Festival (1987)
  - Caligari Film Award (Kazuo Hara)
- Blue Ribbon Awards (1988)
  - Best Director (Kazuo Hara)
- Kinema Junpo Awards (1988)
  - Readers' Choice Award for Best Film (Kazuo Hara)
- Mainichi Film Concours (1988)
  - Best Director (Kazuo Hara)
  - Best Sound Recording (Toyohiko Kuribayashi)
- Rotterdam International Film Festival (1988)
  - KNF Award (Kazuo Hara)
- Yokohama Film Festival (1988)
  - Best Director (Kazuo Hara)
  - Best Film

The film was highly praised by other documentary filmmakers. Errol Morris listed it as one of his top 5 favorite films for Rotten Tomatoes, while Mark Cousins credited it with reviving his own film-making.

== See also ==
- Japanese War Crimes Tribunal § Cannibalism
