= The Grave Mound =

German fairy tale

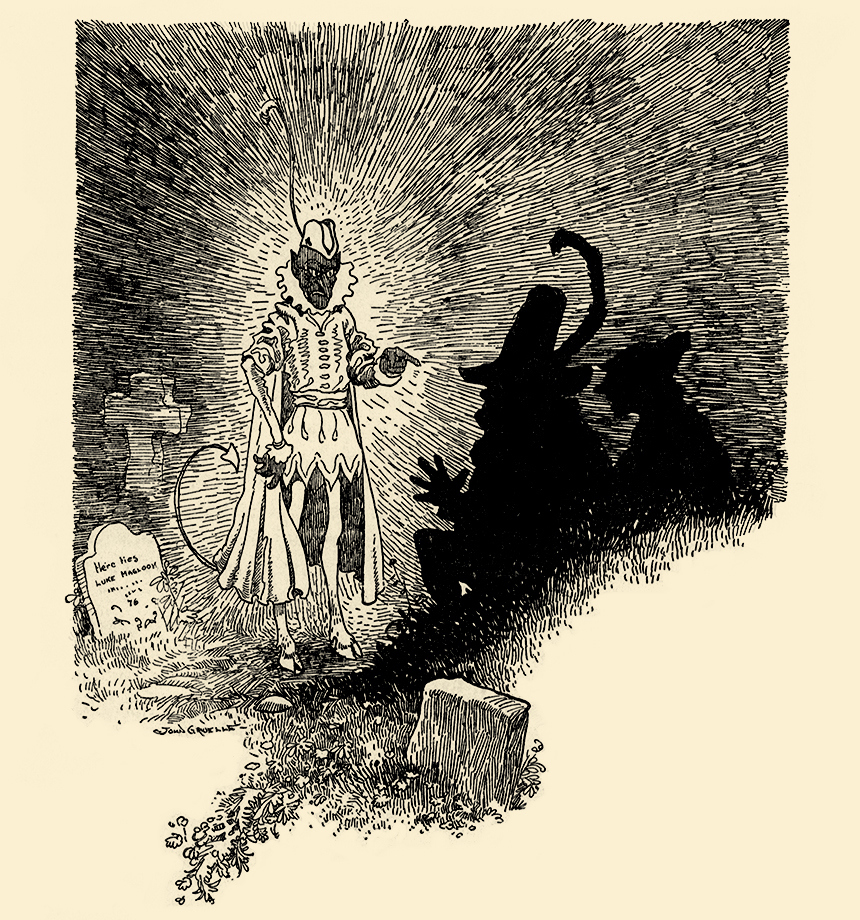
- "Stupid Devil," cried the soldier, "it won’t do!..." - Illustration by Johnny Gruelle for The Grave Mound (1914)

Folk tale
- Name: The Grave Mound
- Aarne–Thompson grouping: ATU 779
- Country: Germany
- Published in: Grimms' Fairy Tales

"The Grave Mound" (German: Der Grabhügel) is a German fairy tale collected by the Brothers Grimm, KHM 195. It is Aarne-Thompson type 779, Divine Rewards and Punishments.

== Story ==
While standing and looking at his field and gardens, a rich farmer hears a voice that asks him if he has helped the poor and hungry. He realizes that he has turned his poor neighbours away from his door and has only thought of increasing his own wealth. His knees give way beneath him as he realises his sin. Just then, there is a knock at the door. He opens it to see his poor neighbour, who, believing he will be turned away, has steeled himself to beg for four measures of corn to feed his young children. The rich farmer gives eight measures to the man, with the stipulation that when he dies, the poor man will stand guard over his grave for three nights. When the rich man suddenly dies three days later, unlamented by his neighbours he is buried, and the poor man keeps his side of the bargain and watches over the grave by night, returning to his humble home at daybreak.

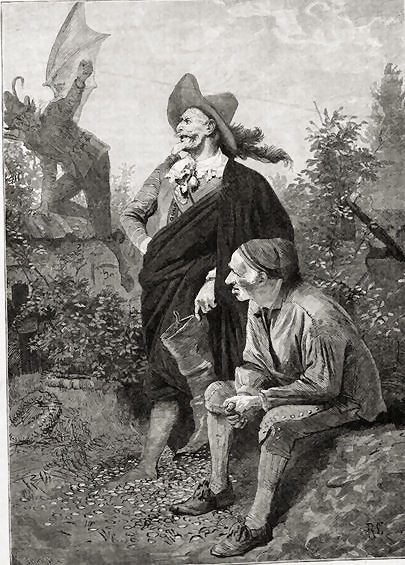
Illustration for The Grave Mound c1890

On the third and final night, a passing battle-scarred and retired soldier pauses to rest by the churchyard and says he will sit with the poor man and join him in watching over the grave. At midnight, the two are disturbed by a shrill whistling, which heralds the arrival of the Devil, who has come to claim the rich man's soul. The two defy him, so after threatening them, the devil tries a subtler ruse and bribes the men with an offer of gold into giving up their watch. The soldier says that if the devil fills his boot with gold, they will leave. The Devil departs to fetch the gold, and in his absence, the soldier takes off his boot and cuts a large hole in the sole.

The Devil returns with a bag of gold, which he pours into the boot, but it falls through the sole into a hole in the ground. The soldier chides the Devil for his meanness, and the Devil is forced to fetch more gold, but again, he fails to fill the boot. Just as the Devil is about to snatch the boot from the hand of the soldier, the light of dawn breaks, and the Devil flees with loud shrieks. The poor man and the soldier having saved the soul of the rich man, discuss how best to divide the gold. The soldier says that his share is to be given to the poor, and he goes with the poor man to his cottage to live out his days.
