= The Wolf and the Fox =

German fairy tale

Folk tale
- Name: The Wolf and the Fox
- Aarne–Thompson grouping: ATU 41
- Country: Germany
- Published in: Grimms' Fairy Tales

"The Wolf and the Fox" is a German fairy tale collected by the Brothers Grimm. The story involves a greedy, gluttonous wolf living with a fox. The wolf makes the fox do all his work and threatens to eat him if he does not otherwise comply. The fox, in turn, devises a scheme to rid himself of the wolf.

== Synopsis ==
A wolf and a fox live together, but the Fox, being the weaker of the two, is forced to do all the hard work for the wolf. One day, the wolf makes the fox get him something to eat and the fox says he knows where there are a couple of lambs. The fox steals a lamb for the wolf. But not content with just one, the wolf goes back for more. He is caught by the farmer's men and thrown out after being severely beaten.

The next day, the wolf again makes the fox get him some food. The fox says he knows of a house in the village where a woman is baking pancakes and steals some for the wolf. Wanting more, the wolf goes to the farm on his own, but causes a commotion which gets the woman's attention and is kicked out once again after she attacks him with her frying pan.

Some time later, the wolf again makes the fox get him food. The fox leads him to a farmer's cellar where meat is stored. The wolf gobbles up the meat. The fox also takes some, but keeps checking his waistline to make sure he can still get out the way he came in. The fox's constant scurrying gets the attention of the farmer who goes to investigate. The fox is able to escape, but the Wolf has eaten so much that he cannot fit through the way he came in and is caught and killed by the farmer.

== In popular culture ==
- "The Wolf and the Fox" is included in the anime series Grimm's Fairy Tale Classics. In the English dub, the Wolf is voice provided by Steve Kramer and the Fox voice provided by Dave Mallow. There were some differences in the plot of this episode. In this version, the Wolf has had terrible hunting skills where he was unable to catch a deer, some rabbits, a family of ducks, and was repelled by a farmer when he tried to target the farmer's cattle. The Wolf has also tried to obtain some followers from a deer, a squirrel, a hawk, and a bear. After the Wolf threatens to eat him, the Fox ends up taking up the Wolf's previous offer to make him his follower which is where the Wolf makes the Fox obtain food for him. The first part involved fishing from a frozen pond during winter. The Wolf got his tail stuck in the ice which the Fox had to help the Wolf remove at the cost of part of the Wolf's tail. Then in the spring, Fox obtained a fried egg from a farmer's house. The Wolf tried to go for another, but broke one of the dishes giving himself away to the farmer's wife as the farmer beats up the Wolf. After talking with a deer, the Fox comes up with a plan where he takes the recuperated Wolf to a basement containing salted meat. To complete his trap to get rid of the Wolf, the Fox causes a racket to alert a local farmer and the Wolf gets stuck in the hole where he is caught by the farmer. The Fox continued to run and makes it back to the forest. The Fox tells the local animals that the Wolf isn't coming back and states that he is free of him.
- The story was adapted into an episode of the British animated series Wolves, Witches and Giants, in which the Wolf has become so fat after eating all the pastries in a baker's larder that he gets stuck while trying to escape, and is forced to do washing for the baker to pay off his debt.
