= Kazuo Hara =

Japanese documentary filmmaker (born 1945)

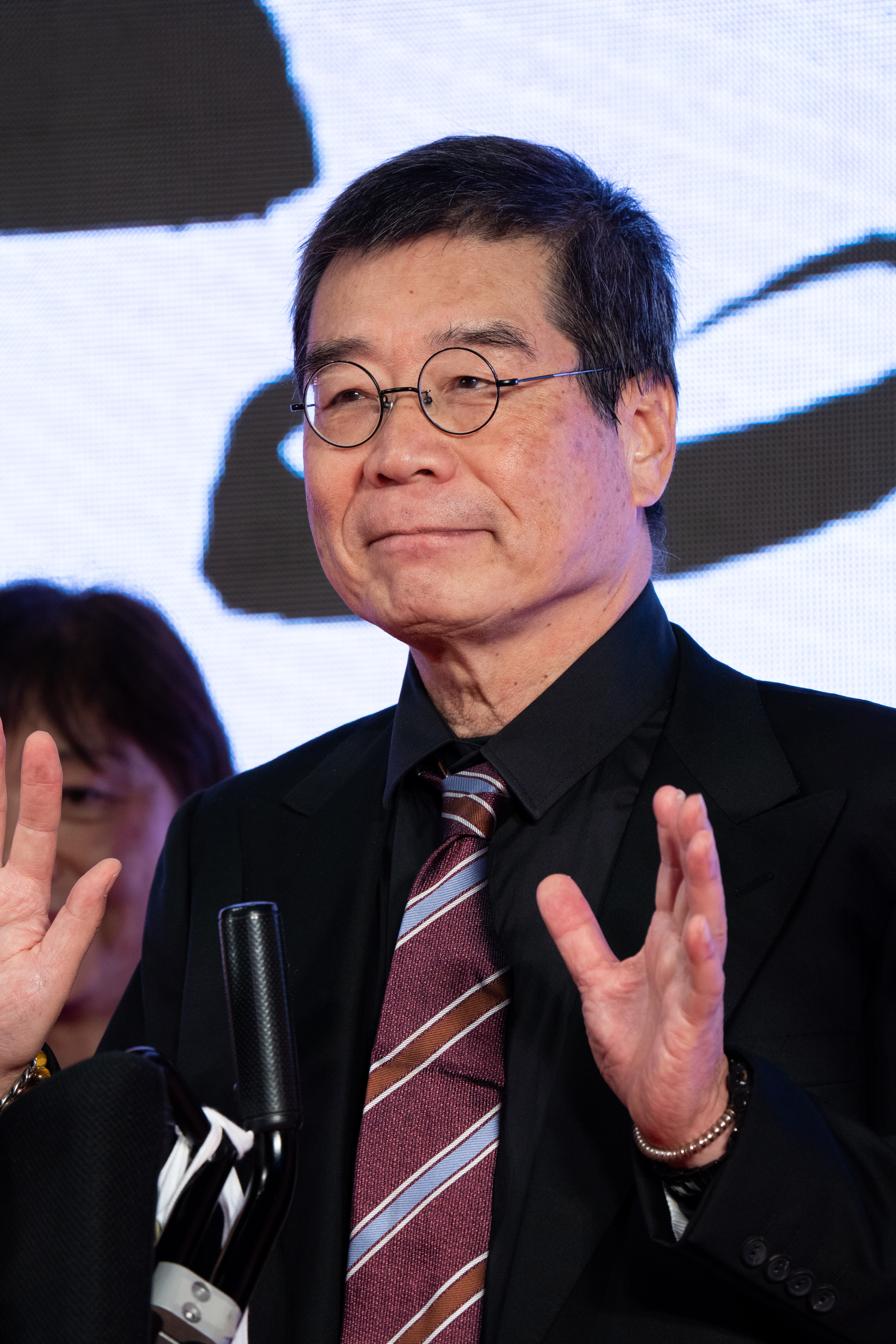
- Hara in 2019
- Born: 8 June 1945 (age 81); Ube, Yamaguchi, Japan
- Occupation: Film director

Kazuo Hara (Japanese: 原一男, Hepburn: Hara Kazuo; 8 June 1945) is a Japanese documentary film director. After dropping out of university to work at a special education school, he made his 1972 debut work Goodbye CP about a group of individuals with cerebral palsy. He won the award for Best Director at the 12th Hochi Film Award and at the 9th Yokohama Film Festival for The Emperor's Naked Army Marches On. That film also earned him the Directors Guild of Japan New Directors Award.

In 2017 he released the documentary Sennan Asbestos Disaster which received the 2017 Audience Award at the Tokyo Filmex International Film Festival and the 2017 BIFF Mecenat Award at the Busan International Film Festival.

His documentary works often depict people who push against the boundaries of propriety and obedience in Japanese society.

== Documentary method ==
Hara has described his approach to filmmaking as "action documentary", rejecting the idea that documentary filmmakers should remain detached or objective. Explaining his methods, Hara describes "initiating things": "I believe that to take action with your body means to see things that you would otherwise not be able to see... I want to take action with my body, because a body that takes action is a wonderful thing. We want to see what will unfold when the camera takes action, when bodies take action."

Film scholar Markus Nornes similarly describes Hara's cinema as the record of an encounter between filmmaker and subject, in which Hara's presence becomes part of the reality being depicted.

Hara's methods have also raised questions about the ethics of documentary film. His work frequently explores highly private situations – as in Extreme Private Eros: Love Song 1974 – and he continues filming during moments of conflict, vulnerability, or violence – as in The Emperor's Naked Army Marches On.

These ethical questions can becomes part of the films themselves: in Goodbye CP, the wife of the film's subject objects on camera to the filmmakers' methods, arguing that their representation of disability risks reinforcing discrimination. Nornes describes this sequence as part of the film's self-reflexivity, leaving its strategy open to criticism:

"In the film's most striking and controversial scene, Yokota strikes out into the public realm without a wheelchair ... and without clothing. He literally drags his naked body down the street. The film has a remarkable level of self-reflexivity, which exposes Hara to, indeed, invites criticism of, the filmmakers' unorthodox strategy of empowerment through representation. In an extraordinary scene, Yokota's wife, who suffers from the same disease, threatens divorce if the filmmaking does not stop. She argues forcefully that such aggressive tactics are only playing to the camera as a monstrosity."

== Filmography ==
=== As director ===
- 1972: Goodbye CP (さようならCP, Sayōnara CP)
- 1974: Extreme Private Eros: Love Song 1974
- 1987: The Emperor's Naked Army Marches On
- 1994: A Dedicated Life (Zenshin shōsetsuka)
- 1999: My Mishima (わたしの見島, Watashi No Mishima)
- 2005: The Many Faces of Chika (またの日の知華, Mata no Hi no Chika) (fictional film)
- 2017: Sennan Asbestos Disaster (ニッポン国VS泉南石綿村, Nippon-koku vs Sennan Ishiwata Son)
- 2019: Reiwa Uprising (れいわ一揆, Rei wa ikki)
- 2021: Minamata Mandala (水俣曼荼羅)

=== As actor ===
- 2016: Shin Godzilla

== Bibliography ==
- Hara, Kazuo (2009). Camera Obtrusa: The Action Documentaries of Hara Kazuo. New York: Kaya Press. ISBN 978-1-885030-44-3.
