= Henry Moore (disambiguation) =

Henry Moore (1898–1986) was a British sculptor and artist.

Henry Moore may also refer to:

== Arts and entertainment ==
- H. Byron Moore (1839–1925), Australian horse racing official
- Henry Eaton Moore (1803–1841), American composer
- Henry E. Moore, American singing school master
- Henry Moore (painter) (1831–1895), British painter

== Nobility ==
- Henry Moore, 1st Earl of Drogheda (died 1676), Irish peer, Earl of Drogheda
- Henry Hamilton-Moore, 3rd Earl of Drogheda (died 1714), Irish peer, Earl of Drogheda
- Henry Moore, 4th Earl of Drogheda (1700–1727), Irish peer, Earl of Drogheda
- Henry Moore, 3rd Marquess of Drogheda (1837–1892), Irish peer
- Henry Moore, 10th Earl of Drogheda (1884–1957), Irish peer on Chairman of Committees

== Politics ==
- Sir Henry Moore, 1st Baronet (1713–1769), British colonial Governor of New York, Jamaica, etc.
- Henry Moore (Australian politician) (1815–1888), member of the New South Wales Legislative Council
- Henry D. Moore (1817–1887), United States Congressman from Pennsylvania
- Henry Monck-Mason Moore (1887–1964), British Governor of Sierra Leone, Kenya and Ceylon

== Religion ==
- Henry Moore (Unitarian) (1732–1802), British minister and hymn-writer
- Henry Moore (biographer) (1751–1844), British Wesleyan minister and biographer of John Wesley
- Henry Moore (priest) (1795–1876), Archdeacon of Stafford
- Henry Moore (bishop) (1923–2025), Bishop of Cyprus and the Gulf

== Sports ==
- Henry Moore (baseball) (died 1902), American baseball player
- Henry Moore (cricketer) (1849–1916), English-born cricketer in New Zealand
- Henry W. Moore (1876–1917), Negro leagues baseball player
- Henry Moore (American football) (1934–2023), American football defensive back/halfback

== Others ==
- Henry Moore (police officer) (1848–1918), British policeman
- Henry Ludwell Moore (1869–1958), American economist
- Sir Henry Ruthven Moore (1886–1978), British admiral
- Henry Moore (colonial manager), CEO of the South Australian Company, 1901–1929
- Henry T. Moore, American academic and the second president of Skidmore College
- Henry Lee Moore (1874–c.1956 or after), American forger, double murderer, and possible serial killer

== See also ==
- Harry Moore (disambiguation)
- Henry Moor (1809–1877), second mayor of Melbourne and Member of Parliament for Brighton
- Henry More (1614–1687), English philosopher
- Henry More (Jesuit) (1586–1661), English Jesuit
- John Henry Moore (disambiguation)
