= Harry Moore =

Harry Moore may refer to:

== Politicians ==
- A. Harry Moore (1879–1952), U.S. senator and governor of New Jersey
- Harry Andrew Moore (1914–1998), Canadian politician
- Harry Moore (Australian politician) (1924–2009), Australian Labor Party politician

== Sports ==
- Harry Moore (baseball) (1876–1917), Negro league baseball player
- Harry Moore (footballer, born 1861) (1861–1939), England international footballer
- Harry Moore (Australian footballer) (1928–1989), played with South Melbourne in VFL
- Harry Moore (cricketer) (born 2007, Derbyshire cricketer)

== Others ==
- Harry Charles Moore (1941–1997), American murderer executed in Oregon
- Harry Wilkinson Moore (1850–1915), British architect
- Harry T. Moore (1905–1951), African-American civil rights activist
- Harry Humphrey Moore (1844–1926), American painter
- Harry Estill Moore ( 1897–1966), American professor and sociologist
- Harry Tunis Moore (1874–1955), bishop of Dallas

== See also ==
- Henry Moore (disambiguation)
- Harold Moore (disambiguation)
- Harrison Moore (1867–1935), Australian lawyer and academic
