= The Good Bargain =

German fairy tale

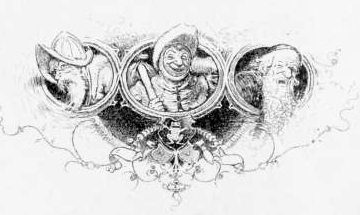
- The Soldier, the Peasant and the Jew in The Good Bargain, illustration by Hermann Vogel - Kinder- und Hausmärchen, München: Verlag von Braun u. Schneider, c. 1892

Folk tale
- Name: The Good Bargain
- Also known as: Der Gute Handel
- Aarne–Thompson grouping: ATU 1642
- Country: Germany
- Published in: Grimms' Fairy Tales

"The Good Bargain" (German: Der Gute Handel) is a German fairy tale collected by the Brothers Grimm, KHM 7. This antisemitic fairytale was added to the Grimms' collection Kinder- und Hausmärchen with the second edition of 1819. It is a tale of Aarne–Thompson type 1642. A similar antisemitic tale collected by the Grimms' is The Jew Among Thorns (Der Jude im Dorn).

== Story ==
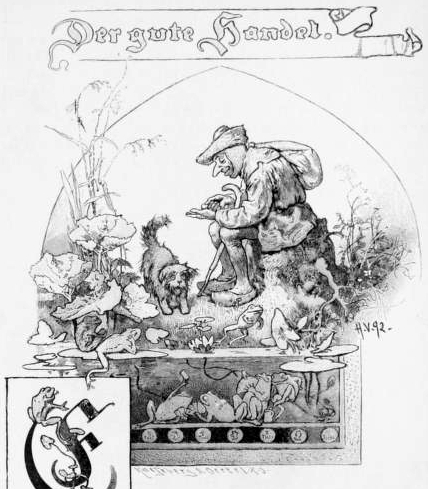
The Peasant and the Frogs - illustration by Hermann Vogel - Kinder- und Hausmärchen, München: Verlag von Braun u. Schneider, c 1892

A peasant took his cow to market where he sold her for seven thalers. On his way home he passed a pond where the frogs sang out, "akt, akt, akt, akt", which to him sounded like "eight, eight, eight, eight". "What nonsense they speak", he said, "for I was paid seven and not eight". But still they called out, "akt, akt, akt, akt". Rushing to the water's edge the peasant shouted "You stupid animals! I was paid seven thalers, not eight!" and he took the coins from his purse and counted them, but still the frogs persisted with their "akt, akt, akt, akt".

"Well", he shouted, "if you think you know more about it than me you can count them for yourselves!" With that he threw the coins into the pond and waited for the frogs to count them and throw them back, but still the frogs cried out "akt, akt, akt, akt". The peasant waited and waited. He waited until late into the evening when finally he gave up and went home, cursing the frogs for their stupidity as he went.

He arrived home in a bad mood and decided he would buy another cow. This he did and he slaughtered it himself, thinking that if he could get a good price for the meat he would make as much as the two cows had been worth and would have the cow's hide too. The peasant took the meat to town where he was met at the town gate by a pack of dogs led by a large greyhound, who belonged to the town's butcher. The greyhound came sniffing to the meat and barked "Bow wow, what now?" The peasant said to the dog, "I understand that you want the meat but I cannot give it to you for free. If you will be responsible for your fellows I will leave the meat with you for I know your master. But mind, you must bring me the money for the meat in three days." "Bow wow, what now?" said the dog. Satisfied with the deal the peasant left.

After three days the peasant had not received his money. "I trusted that dog to keep the bargain", he said to himself bitterly. Storming into town he went straight to the butcher and demanded payment for the meat. The butcher thought the peasant was joking, but the peasant insisted he wanted payment for the meat he had left in the custody of the butcher's dog. Instead the butcher seized his broom and chased the peasant out of his shop.

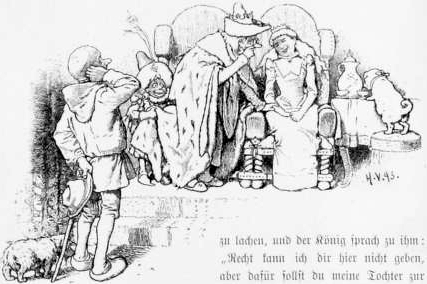
The Peasant appeals to the King- illustration by Hermann Vogel - Kinder- und Hausmärchen, München: Verlag von Braun u. Schneider, c 1893

"I will get justice!", said the peasant. "I will go to the king!", and with that he set off for the royal palace. Appearing before the king and his daughter, the king demanded of him what was his grievance. "Well", said the peasant, "the frogs stole my money and the dogs my meat and the butcher struck me with the broom handle!" As he told his tale the princess laughed out loud. The king, however, listened patiently and said, "I cannot put right the wrong done to you, but instead you can have the hand of my daughter. She has never laughed before and I promised that she should marry the first man to make her do so. You can thank God for your good fortune today." "But I already have a wife at home and she's quite enough of a handful", said the peasant, "and I do not want another."

Insulted, the king angrily said to the peasant, "You are a lout!" to which the peasant replied "What else can you expect from an ox, your majesty, but beef?" The king replied, "Well, instead you can have a different reward. Leave now but return in three days when you shall receive five hundred." Happily, the peasant left, and on passing through the town gate met the sentry, who said that in return for making the princess laugh the peasant must have received a great reward. "I haver indeed", replied the peasant. "In three days I must return when five hundred will be counted out for me."

"What can you do with all that money?", asked the soldier. "Let me have some of it." The peasant agreed to let the soldier have two hundred from his share. "In three days go to the king", he said "and have it counted out for you."

Nearby stood a Jew, who on hearing their conversation went to the peasant and on praising his good fortune said he would exchange the promised thalers for smaller coins. "Jew", said the peasant, "you can have three hundred. Give me the coins now and in three days go to the king to have the balance counted out to you." Delighted with his bargain the Jew brought the equivalent sum in groschens – but substituted one counterfeit coin for every two real ones. Three days later the peasant stood before the king to have his promised reward counted out to him - but instead of five hundred thalers the reward was five hundred blows.

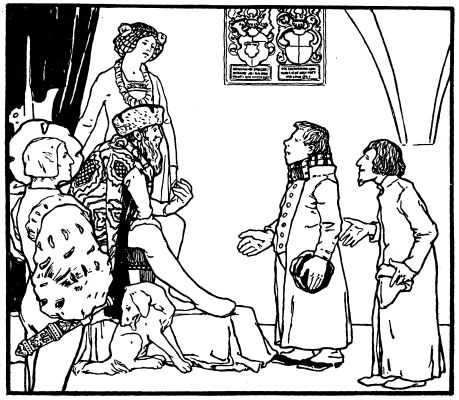
The Soldier and the Jew claim their reward - Illustration by Otto Ubbelohde for Grimms' Fairy Tales (1909)

"Sire," said the peasant, "the reward no longer belongs to me for I gave two hundred to the sentry and three hundred to the Jew." At that time the two walked in to receive what had been promised to them - and each received the allotted blows. The soldier, being used to such treatment took them well. But the Jew piteously cried out, "Oh my, oh my, these thalers are hard!"

The king was much amused by the peasant's escape from his 'reward', and told him that he could go into the treasure chamber and take as much gold as he wanted. Not needing to be told twice, the peasant went straight to the treasure chamber where he stuffed his pockets with gold after which he went to a nearby inn to count his reward. However, still smarting from the blows he had received through his 'bargain', the Jew secretly followed the peasant and overheard him muttering, "That rascal of a king has cheated me. If he had just given me the money then I would know how much I have. But how can I know how much I put in my pockets?" On hearing the peasant speaking so disrespectfully about the king the Jew decided to report him in the hope of a reward and hope that the peasant who had cheated him would receive a fitting punishment.

On being told of the peasant's disrespect the king angrily demanded that he be brought before him. The Jew went straight to the peasant to tell him he must go at once to the king just as he was. The peasant said, "It is not right that someone like me with so much gold in his pockets should appear before the king shabbily dressed. Lend me a nice coat so I can make a fitting appearance." Fearing that the king's anger would cool if there was a delay which would lead to the loss of his reward and the peasant's punishment the Jew lent him a fine coat.

Standing in his fine coat the king demanded of the peasant, "What is this you have been saying about me?"

"Sire", said the peasant, "you cannot believe a word that comes out of the mouth of a Jew! Why, I bet he will even claim that this fine coat is his!"

"What?", cried the Jew. "Of course the coat is mine - lent by me to you to wear before the king!"

"Well", thought the king, "the Jew is lying to one of us. Either to me or to the peasant". And again he had the Jew paid out in hard thalers. The peasant walked home in the fine coat with his pockets stuffed with gold and said to himself, "This time I made a good bargain!"

== Analysis ==
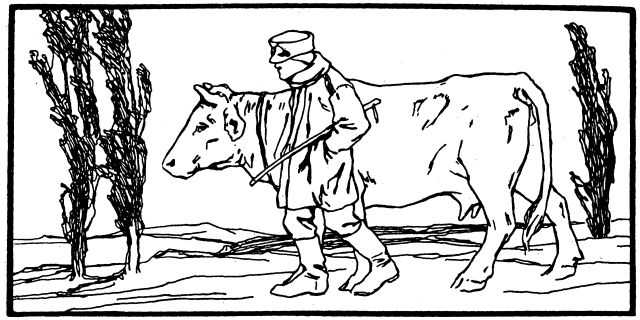
The Peasant takes the cow to market - Illustration by Otto Ubbelohde for Grimms' Fairy Tales (1909)

Of the 211 folk tales collected and published by the Brothers Grimm in the final edition of 1857, three have central Jewish characters: The Good Bargain, The Jew Among Thorns and The Bright Sun Brings It to Light (Die klare Sonne bringt's an den Tag) No. 115, with the first two being overtly antisemitic while the third is more ambiguous in the way in which it depicts its Jewish character. Historians debate whether these tales reflect the views of the Grimm Brothers or register the popular views of the common folk whose stories they recorded.

In Nazi Germany the authorities seized on these tales for propaganda purposes and promoted them as folk literature, thus corrupting the Grimms' fairy tales into "Jewish" tales. Nazi educationalists and propagandists used these unexpurgated tales to indoctrinate children; Louis L. Snyder writes that "a large part of the Nazi literature designed for children was merely a modernized version of the Grimms' tales".

Joyce Crick in her edition of the Grimms' Selected Tales (2005) makes it clear she does not like the story, referring to it as 'scarcely a Märchen' (a fairy tale) and 'a crude rustic tale'. In The Annotated Brothers Grimm (2012) the American academic and expert in children's literature, German literature and folklore Maria Tatar writes at length about the violent antisemitic story The Jew Among Thorns but mentions The Good Bargain in passing when she notes the oddness of including such unpleasant tales in a volume of fairy tales supposedly dedicated to showing "the 'purity' and 'innocence' of the folk." Tatar adds, "Nothing like these tales exists in the other major nineteenth-century collections of German fairy tales". However, it is not unusual to find uncomfortable stereotypical portraits of Jews such as the two in The Jew Among Thorns and The Good Bargain in other European stories of the period and in the German Romantic tradition in particular, reflecting the antisemitism common in European society of the 19th-century in which Jews are frequently shown as penny-pinching swindlers.

The blogger Helen Barry on her site Gallimaufry gives her opinion that the comedy in The Good Bargain "has not worn well either". She also notes the similarity of some of the characters in the tale to those in other fairy tales: the naïve hero who comes good in the end despite himself; a princess whose hand is offered as the reward for some completed task; a princess who cannot laugh; and the use of trickery.

== Variants ==
Some edited versions attempt to downplay the antisemitic aspect by referring to the character as a "moneylender" rather than a Jew.
