= Jacob Bailey Moore =

American journalist

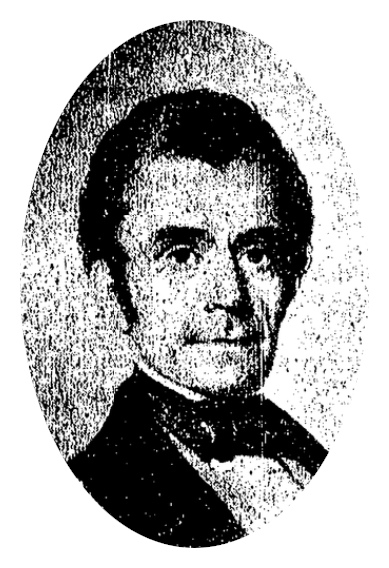
- Born: October 31, 1797; Andover, New Hampshire, U.S.
- Died: September 1, 1853 (aged 55); Bellows Falls, Vermont, U.S.
- Resting place: Bellows Falls, Vermont
- Occupations: Journalist, printer, editor, deputy postmaster
- Spouse: Mary Adams Hill (m. 1820)
- Children: 6, including George Henry Moore and Frank Moore
- Relatives: Isaac Hill (brother-in-law)
- Family: Henry Eaton Moore and John Weeks Moore (brothers)

Jacob Bailey Moore (October 31, 1797 – September 1, 1853) was an American journalist, printer, newspaper editor and historical writer. He also was elected to the New Hampshire General Court (state legislature) and was deputy postmaster of San Francisco.

== Biography ==
Moore's ancestors emigrated to the United States from Scotland. His father (born in Georgetown, Maine, September 5, 1772; died in Andover, New Hampshire, January 10, 1813), who had the same name, was a physician. The elder Moore studied medicine, settled in Andover in 1796, and practiced successfully until 1812, when he was appointed surgeon's mate in the United States Army. The elder Moore wrote verses and numerous newspaper articles, and composed several pieces of music that were published in Samuel Holyoke's Columbian Repository.

Moore was born in 1797 in Andover, New Hampshire. He became an apprentice under Isaac Hill in 1813 and learned the printer's trade at Concord. The two men became partners publishing the New Hampshire Patriot, but ended their partnership in 1823 due to political differences, Moore being a supporter of John Quincy Adams while Hill supported Andrew Jackson. Moore was one of the founders of the New Hampshire Historical Society (established in 1823) and was that organization's first librarian. Later, he engaged in editorial work and edited the New Hampshire Journal from 1826 until 1829, when he was elected sheriff of Merrimack County. He was elected to the state legislature in 1828, but resigned shortly after being elected.

Moore was elected a member of the American Antiquarian Society in 1821. In 1839, he moved to New York City and edited the Daily Whig. Moore was a clerk employed by the United States Post Office in Washington, D.C., 1841–1845, then returned to New York and served as librarian of the New York Historical Society from 1845 to 1849. In 1850, he was named deputy postmaster of San Francisco by President Millard Fillmore.

Moore's brother Henry Eaton Moore was a composer, and another brother, John Weeks Moore, edited musical publications. Moore married Mary Adams Hill, a sister of Isaac Hill, in 1820—the couple had two daughters and four sons. Of their children, George was an author and librarian, Frank was a journalist, and Charles and another son also named Jacob were granted patents for early calculating machines. Moore died in 1853 at the home of his brother John in Bellows Falls, Vermont. A painting of Moore by Helena Smith Dayton—made in 1947 as a reproduction of an original portrait in the San Francisco Post Office—is in the collection of the New Hampshire Historical Society. Houghton Library at Harvard University has several boxes of Moore's papers in its archives.

== Publications ==
Moore's numerous publications include:

- A Topographical and Historical Sketch of the Town of Andover (1822)
- Collections, Topographical, Historical and Biographical, Relating Principally to New Hampshire (c. 1822–1823), with John Farmer

Vol. 1, Vol. 2, Vol. 3 — one of the first publications devoted to local history in the United States

- Gazetteer of the State of New Hampshire (1823), with John Farmer
- Annals of the Town of Concord (1824)

includes A Memoir of the Penacook Indians by John Farmer

- Laws of Trade in the United States (1840)
- Memoirs of American Governors (1846)
- Lives of the Governors of New Plymouth and Massachusetts Bay (1848)

== Sources ==
- Dumas Malone, ed. (1932). Dictionary of American biography. Vol. XIII. New York: Charles Scribner's Sons.
- Wilson, J. G.; Fiske, J., eds. (1900). "Moore, Jacob Bailey" . Appletons' Cyclopædia of American Biography. New York: D. Appleton.
- Gilman, D. C.; Peck, H. T.; Colby, F. M., eds. (1905). "Moore, Jacob Bailey" . New International Encyclopedia (1st ed.). New York: Dodd, Mead.
- Rines, George Edwin, ed. (1920). "Moore, Jacob Bailey" . Encyclopedia Americana.
