= The Jew Among Thorns =

German fairy tale

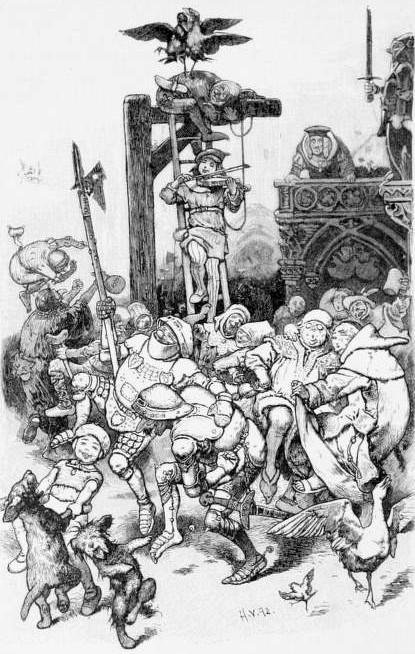
- Illustration by Hermann Vogel

Folk tale
- Name: The Jew Among Thorns
- Also known as: Der Jude im Dorn
- Aarne–Thompson grouping: ATU 592
- Published in: Grimm's Fairy Tales

"The Jew Among Thorns" (German: Der Jude im Dorn), also known as The Jew in the Brambles, is an antisemitic fairytale collected by the Brothers Grimm (no. 110). It is a tale of Aarne–Thompson type 592 ('Dancing in Thorns'). A similar antisemitic tale in the collection is The Good Bargain.

== Origin ==
The tale has been told in Europe since the 15th century. In its earlier version, it did not depict a Jew but a Christian monk who is made to dance in a thorn bush by a boy who, to effect the punishing trick, plays either a flute or a fiddle. This anti-clerical leitmotif was often reprinted in jest books of that period and during the Renaissance.

The Brothers Grimm first published this tale in the first edition of Kinder- und Hausmärchen in 1815 (vol. 2). They knew at least 4 previous versions: Albrecht Dietrich's Historia von einem Bawrenknecht (1618), originally written as a rhymed theatre piece in 1599, Jakob Ayrer's Fritz Dölla mit seiner gewünschten Geigen (1620), and two oral versions from Hesse and the von Haxthausen family.

== Synopsis ==
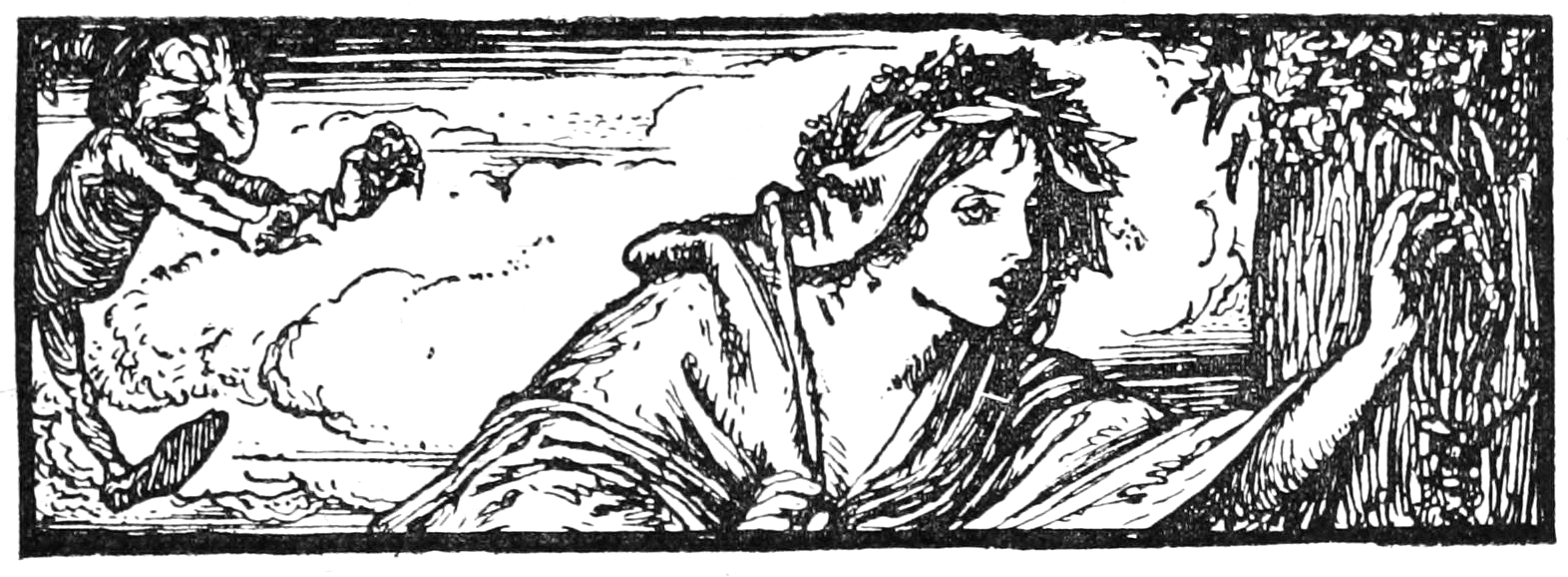
Illustration from the 1912 edition of Grimm's Household Tales

After spending a year in the service of a rich employer, an honest, hard-working servant is not paid but his services are retained in the belief he would continue to work without wages. This recurs at the end of the second year. At the close of the third year, when his master is seen searching in his pocket and withdrawing his empty fist, the servant asks his master to pay a just sum so the servant can seek work elsewhere. He is paid 'liberally' with three pfennig; knowing nothing of the value of money, the servant leaves, thinking he has been well rewarded.

Happy with his new wealth, the servant comes across a dwarf who complains that he is destitute and asks the servant to hand over his earnings because he, unlike the dwarf, is a fit, happy, young fellow who will find plenty of work. The kind-hearted youth does so; impressed by his generosity, the dwarf grants him three wishes. The youth asks for a fowling gun that will unerringly hit its intended target; a fiddle that when he plays it will compel anyone who hears its music to dance; and the power to have no request he makes rebuffed. They part ways and the youth continues his journey.

The youth soon encounters a Jew with a goatee who is listening to a songbird. The Jew marvels at the powerful voice of the small animal and expresses a desire to have it. The youth shoots the bird, which falls into a thorny hedge. As the Jew carefully picks his way through the brambles to retrieve the bird, the youth plays his fiddle, causing the Jew to start dancing irresistibly. His frantic dancing among the thorns causes his shabby coat to be torn to rags, his beard to be combed out, and his flesh to be torn. The Jew begs the youth to stop playing but the youth persists, thinking; "You've abused people enough with your slave-driving ways. Now the thorn bushes will serve you up with no worse."

The Jew then offers the youth a handsome sum of money to stop playing the fiddle, which he accepts, mocking the Jew by complimenting him on his fine dancing style. The Jew subsequently seeks out a magistrate and lodges a complaint against the servant, claiming that the servant stole the money. After inquiries are made, the youth is arrested for extortion; he is tried and condemned to hang from the gallows. He asks a final favour: to be allowed to play his fiddle. The Jew protests vigorously but the judge grants the youth's request and the townsfolk are enchanted into manic dancing, which will not end until the Jew states that the money was not stolen. The youth is released and asks the Jew where he had gotten the money. The Jew confesses, under the threat that the youth will keep on playing, to have stolen it and is hanged in the servant's place.

== Variants ==
An American version from Kentucky, titled "The Jew That Danced amongst the Thorn Bushes", has been recorded in Marie Campbell's Tales from the Cloud Walking Country, published in 1958. It also includes an apology from her informant: "Seems like all the tales about Jews gives the Jews a bad name—greedy, grabbing for cash money, cheating their work hands out of their wages—I don’t know what all. I never did know a Jew, never even met up with one."

== Analysis ==
=== Antisemitism ===
According to Emanuel Bin-Gorion, The Jew Among Thorns is a narrative in which the "Jewishness" of the character is not an essential ingredient of the story but is incidental to it. The story, however, can be read as suggesting that Jews are not entitled to Christian justice, and that while other Christian characters have putatively Jewish traits such as an interest in money, trading, miserliness and roguish deceptiveness (such as the rich employer of the fiddling youth), it is the Jew alone who must be punished.

The virulent strain of German antisemitism has been detected in the Grimms' fairy-tales, and though this overt hostility plays a small part in the collection overall, its anti-Jewish agenda is significant and emerges in three of the 211 tales of the final 1857 edition. Other than The Jew Among Thorns, antisemitic themes are present in two other stories; Der gute Handel (The Good Bargain), and Die klare Sonne bringt's an den Tag (The bright sun will bring it into the light of day). In the Grimms' work Deutsche Sagen, other antisemitic stories such as The Jews' Stone (Der Judenstein) and The Girl who was killed by Jews (Das von den Juden getötete Mägdlein) are present.

In these tales, though all merchants are villains, the Jewish trader is depicted as a particularly unscrupulous exploiter of the poor. Much hinges around the differences between two concepts that are closely related in German; Tausch (trade) and Täuschung (deception). Typically, the Jew is shown as shabbily dressed and having a grey or yellow beard, and is a scapegoat when a hapless character gets into trouble and is condemned to death by hanging. While the theme is minor in the 1857 edition, thirty years earlier in their special children's edition of the tales – Die kleine Ausgabe (small edition) – the two most explicitly antisemitic fairy tales were given much more prominence among the 50 published in that edition. Close examination of his successive redactions of the material show Wilhelm Grimm edited the text to cast the Jewish figure in an increasingly dubious light while making the Knecht (servant) appear to be a more positive character.

Some scholars regard The Jew Among Thorns as the outstanding example of the Grimms' antisemitism because of its humiliating, callous style. Historians debate whether these tales reflect the views of the Grimm Brothers or register the popular views of the common folk whose stories they recorded. As early as 1936, three years into the era of Nazi Germany, Arnold Zweig identified the fable as one that incited antisemitic feelings among the Germans.

Nazi educationalists and propagandists used these unexpurgated tales to indoctrinate children; Louis Leo Snyder writes that "a large part of the Nazi literature designed for children was merely a modernized version of the Grimms' tales".

== Bibliography ==
- Ashliman, Dee L. (2008). "Punishment and Reward". In Haase, Donald (ed.). The Greenwood Encyclopedia of Folktales and Fairy Tales. Greenwood Publishing Group. ISBN 978-0-313-04947-7.
- Helfer, Martha B. (2009). Neulektüren – New Readings: Festschrift für Gerd Labroisse zum 80. Geburtstag (in German). Amsterdam: Rodopi. pp. 31–42. ISBN 978-90-420-2875-3.
- Snyder, Louis Leo (1978). Roots of German nationalism. Indiana University Press. ISBN 978-0-253-35026-8.
