= Van Nostrand =

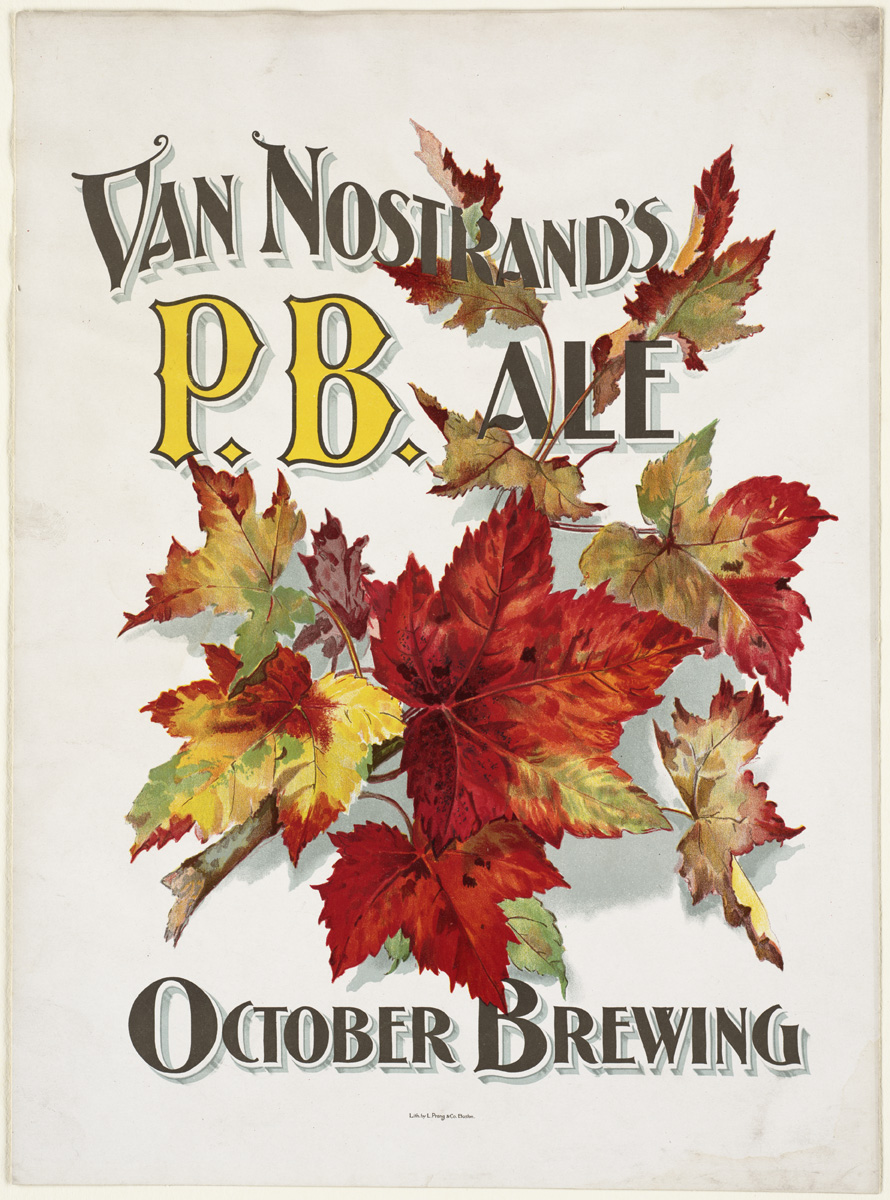

Van Nostrand is a Dutch surname. Notable people with the surname include:

- Amy Van Nostrand (born 1953), American actress
- Burr Van Nostrand, American composer (born 1945)
- David Van Nostrand (1811–1886), American publisher
- John Van Nostrand (1961–1984), American tennis player
- Kevin VanNostrand (born 1987), American kickboxer
- Molly Van Nostrand (born 1965), American tennis player
- Wally Van (born Charles Wallace Van Nostrand; 1880–1974), American actor and director

== See also ==
- Van Nostrand's Scientific Encyclopedia, 1938 encyclopedia of science
- The Van Nostrand Tiara, 1913 silent film
- Van Nostrand Reinhold, an American publisher acquired by John Wiley & Son
- A frequently used alias by the character Cosmo Kramer in the American sitcom Seinfeld.
