= Chemical intermediate =

Product of a reaction used in another

In the chemical industry, a chemical intermediate (collectively "intermediate chemicals") is the (stable) product of a chemical reaction process, valued as a reagent for subsequent industrial chemical processes, as distinguished from a product valuable to the end consumer. For example, ethanol has application as a solvent, a fuel, and in artificial liquors; but when it is sold to manufacture ethyl esters, it is a chemical intermediate.

Some chemicals derive value entirely from their role as chemical intermediates. Cumene is made from benzene and propylene and used to make acetone and phenol in the cumene process. The cumene itself is of relatively little value in and of itself, and is typically only bought and sold by chemical companies. Likewise the United Nations Economic Commission for Europe has summarized adiponitrile as "an intermediate compound in the manufacture of Nylon". Chloroform and carbon tetrachloride have historical uses as (respectively) an anesthetic and a solvent, but now are primarily chemical intermediates for fluorocarbon production. Pure chemical intermediates constitute the majority of chemical products by type; in 1936, Williams Haynes estimated that they constituted 70% of all chemicals manufactured in the United States.
