= Ruth Koser-Michaëls =

German illustrator

Ruth Koser-Michaëls (May 4, 1896 in Berlin; December 5, 1968 in Teisendorf) was a German graphic artist, draughtswoman and illustrator. She is known for her watercolour illustrations of classic children’s literature such as the fairytales by the Brothers Grimm and Hans Christian Andersen.

== Life and work ==
Ruth Michaëls was the daughter of a library director. She attended a school of applied arts, worked as a drawing teacher in Berlin for three years, and spent a year in Munich on a scholarship. Afterwards, she attended the Berlin University of the Arts and studied under F. Spiegels and the artist Käthe Kollwitz.

In 1928, Ruth Michaëls married the press illustrator and caricaturist Martin Koser (Martin Koser-Michaëls; 1903–1971), who worked as an illustrator for the magazines Ulk, BIZ, and Uhu. The two worked together in a master studio for graphic arts at the Prussian Academy of Arts, Berlin, where Ruth Koser-Michaëls drew text illustrations for Die Woche and designed film posters for UFA.

In the mid-1930s, the artist participated in a competition held by what is now the Droemer-Knaur publishing house in Munich, for the illustrations for their series of fairy tale books. Koser-Michaëls won and, in 1934, began illustrating fairy tale books together with her husband. Initially, for contractual reasons, Ruth Koser-Michaëls was listed as the sole illustrator in the books.

The couple's fairy tale book illustrations made them famous in German-speaking countries. Their watercolours depicted doll-like figures in Biedermeier settings, described as humorously whimsical. Books featuring their illustrations were widely distributed until the 1950s, for example, as editions of the Bertelsmann Book Club.

Among their best-known works are the watercolour illustrations for the fairy tale collections of the Brothers Grimm (1937), Andersen (1938), Hauff (1939), and Bechstein (1940), as well as the illustrations for the series "Old German Folk Tales," published by the Winter Relief Fund of the German People (WHW), such as "Puss in Boots" (No. 6, 1941) and "Cinderella" (No. 9, 1941)

After Second World War, Ruth Koser-Michaëls and her husband worked for, among others, the Stuttgart-based publishing house Der Neue Schulmann, for which, for example, they designed a historical frieze for school use in 1953 (accompanying texts: Dr. Hans Heumann). They also designed children's books, games, and further collections of fairy tales. In 1958, a fairy tale book written by Martin Koser-Michaëls and illustrated jointly by the couple was published: Der Jakob von Rotmerkelhof – Eine Mär um die Fresken von Unterschalling.

Ruth Koser-Michaëls and her husband lived and worked in Berlin and, in later years, at Lake Chiemsee. Their daughter, Renate Koser (born 1929), was also an illustrator.

=== Criticism ===
In the 1937 edition of the Brothers Grimm fairy tales, Ruth Koser-Michaëls also illustrated the tale "The Jew among Thorns," which contains antisemitic elements. In it, a servant with a fiddle makes the title character dance in a thorn hedge. Koser-Michaëls' drawing depicted a "completely tattered Jew, with a Jewish cap on his head and the yellow Jewish ring on his garment, swearing revenge on the fiddler with a raised fist." This illustration was still included in the first post-war edition.

=== Trivia ===
The Hans Christian Andersen edition includes the fairy tale "The Snow Queen." It tells the story of the girl Gretchen (actually: Gerda), who is searching for her friend Karl (Kai), whom the Snow Queen has kidnapped. The chapter "Third Story: The Flower Garden at the Woman's Who Could Do Magic" contains an illustration showing a boat. It washes ashore on a riverbank and bears the first name of her daughter Renate.

== Illustrated Works (Selected) ==
- Grimm, Wilhelm Karl and Jacob Ludwig Karl: Märchen der Brüder Grimm (Fairytales by the Brothers Grimm). With 100 watercolour illustrations by Ruth Koser-Michaëls. Munich: Drömersche Verlagsanstalt. 1937 OCLC: 248185244
- Andersen, Hans Christian: Märchen (Fairytales). With 100 watercolour illustrations by Ruth Koser-Michaëls. Munich: Drömersche Verlagsanstalt. 1938. OCLC: 901568191
- Hauff, Wilhelm: Märchen (Fairytales). With 100 watercolour illustrations by Ruth Koser-Michaëls. Berlin: T. Knaur Nachf. 1939. OCLC: 20548065
- Bechstein, Ludwig: Märchen und Sagen (Fairytales and Legends). With 95 watercolour illustrations by Martin and Ruth Koser-Michaëls. Munich: Drömersche Verlagsanstalt Th. Knauer Nachf. 1954 OCLC: 444299680
- Blunck, Hans Friedrich: Märchen (Fairytales). With 100 watercolour illustrations by Ruth Koser-Michaëls. Berlin: T. Knaur Nachf 1941. OCLC: 9360773
- Neumann, Heinz: Donaugeister: alte Sagen und Geschichten von der deutschen Donau (Danube Ghosts: old legends and stories of the German Danube). Illustrated by Martin and Ruth Koser-Michaëls. Munich: Rohrer. 1943. OCLC: 249021930
- Frances Hodgson Burnett: Der kleine Lord (Little Lord Fauntleroy). Translated from English by Lotte Stuart, with 29 illustrations by Martin and Ruth Koser-Michaëls. Munich, Zürich: Droemer. 1959. OCLC: 164700187
- Münchhausen: Des Freiherrn wunderbare Reisen und Abenteuer. Munich: Droemersche Verl.-Anstalt,. 1952. OCLC: 1340464047
- Groll. Gunter: Erzählungen aus Tausend und eine Nacht, (Tales from One Thousand and One Nights) with 80 illustrations by Martin and Ruth Koser-Michaëls. Zürich, Ex Libris, 1977. OCLC: 777577087
- Carroll, Lewis: Alice im Wunderland (Alice in Wonderland). Translated by Wolfgang Freitag, illustrated by Martin and Ruth Koser-Michaëls, Munich: Droemersche Verlagsanstalt. 1955. OCLC: 12333534
- Erik Jelde: Märchen der Welt, Gesammelt und neu erzählt (Fairytales of the world, collected and retold). With 80 illustrations by Martin and Ruth Koser-Michaëls. Munich: Droemer/Knauer. 1958. OCLC: 720103719
- Spyri, Johanna: Gritlis Kinder. Illustrated by Martin and Ruth Koser-Michaëls, Munich: Droemersche Verlagsanstalt.1963 OCLC: 855226772
- Collodi, Carlo: Pinocchios Abenteuer (Pinocchio's Adventures). With 29 illustrations by Martin and Ruth Koser-Michaëls. Munich: Droemersche Verlagsanstalt Th.Knaur Nachf. 1955. OCLC: 215050989
- Curwood, James Oliver: Neewa das Bärenkind. Illustrated by Martin and Ruth Koser-Michaëls. Munich: Droemersche Verlagsanstalt. 1952. OCLC: 633293011
