= George Henry Moore (author) =

American historian (1823–1892)

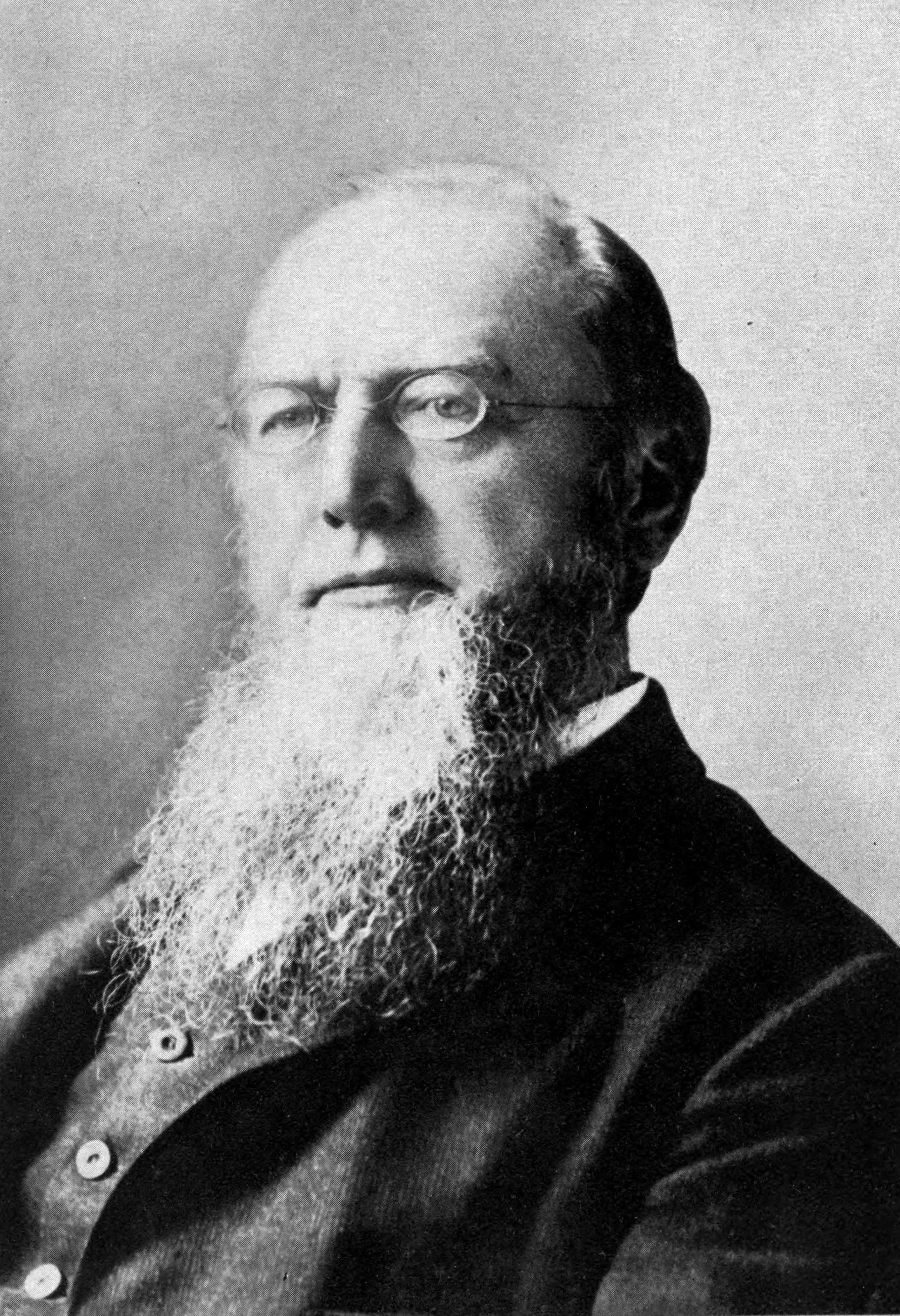
- Portrait by Napoleon Sarony c. 1892.
- Died: New York City

George Henry Moore (April 20, 1823 – May 5, 1892) was an American historical writer and librarian.

== Biography ==
Moore was born in Concord, New Hampshire. Frank Moore, a journalist, was a brother. He moved to New York City in 1839 and in 1843 graduated at New York University. Before leaving college, he had become connected with the New-York Historical Society, as an assistant to his father, Jacob Bailey Moore, the librarian, and in 1849 succeeded him as its librarian. In this position he remained until 1872, when, on the opening of the Lenox Library (now a part of the New York Public Library), he became its first superintendent. Here he remained until his death on May 5, 1892. He was a frequent contributor to historical magazines and to the proceedings of historical societies. The University of New York gave him the degree of LL.D. Moore was elected a member of the American Antiquarian Society in 1880.

In 1881, by then living in Boston, Moore publicized an error made by city councilor William Henry Whitmore regarding a restoration of Boston's Old State House. Whitmore's flawed historical research of the building led to it being restored to a more modern plan instead of an earlier one. A feud between the two was conducted in lecture series and papers between 1884 and 1886.

== Works ==
- The Treason of Charles Lee (1858)
- The Employment of Negroes in the Revolutionary Army (1862)
- Notes on the History of Slavery in Massachusetts (1866)
- A History of the Jurisprudence of New York (1872)
- Notes on the Witchcraft in Massachusetts (1883–85)
- Washington as an Angler (1887)

He wrote numerous pamphlets.
