= Harold Moore =

Harold Moore may refer to:

- Hal Moore (1922–2017), U.S. Army officer
- Harold E. Moore (1917–1980), American botanist
- Khalid Abdul Muhammad (born Harold Moore Jr., 1948–2001), American black activist
- Harold Moore, co-founder of the Association of Comics Magazine Publishers

== See also ==
- Harry Moore (disambiguation)
