= John Weeks Moore =

John Weeks Moore (11 April 1807 – 1889) was an American editor of musical publications. He also authored a historical work on early governmental slavery and politics

== Biography ==
Born in 1807 in Andover, New Hampshire, Moore was a son of Jacob Bailey Moore. He was educated at Concord High School and Plymouth Academy, became a printer, and was connected with several journals. In 1834 he established the first musical newspaper in New Hampshire, and he afterward edited The World of Music, a quarto, The Musical Library, a folio, and the Daily News.

== Works ==
- Vocal and Instrumental Instructor (Bellows Falls, Vt., 1843)
- Sacred Minstrel (1848)
- Complete Encyclopædia of Music, Elementary, Technical, Historical, Biographical, Vocal, and Instrumental (1854)
- American Collection of Instrumental Music (1856)
- Star Collection of Instrumental Music (1858)
- Appendix to Encyclopedia of Instrumental Music (Manchester, N. H., 1858)
- Musical Record (5 vols., 1867–70)
- Songs and Song-Writers of America (200 numbers, 1859–80)
- Historical, Biographical, and Miscellaneous Gatherings relative to Printers, Printing, Publishing of Books, Newspapers, Magazines, and other Literary Productions from 1820 to 1886 (1886), a second volume was in preparation in 1888
