= John Farmer (author) =

American historian and genealogist

- Born: June 12, 1789; Chelmsford, Massachusetts
- Died: August 13, 1838 (aged 49)
- Resting place: Concord, New Hampshire
- Parent(s): John Farmer; Lydia Richardson

John Farmer (June 12, 1789 – August 13, 1838) was an American historian and genealogist, born in Chelmsford, Massachusetts. He was the son of John Farmer and Lydia Richardson. He is buried at Concord, New Hampshire.

Farmer is considered the founder of systematic genealogy in America. Before Farmer's efforts, tracing one's genealogy was seen as an attempt by American colonists to secure a measure of social standing, an aim that was counter to the new republic's egalitarian, future-oriented ethos (as outlined in the Constitution). As Fourth of July celebrations commemorating the Founding Fathers and the heroes of the Revolutionary War became increasingly popular, however, the pursuit of "antiquarianism", which focused on local history, became increasingly acceptable as a way to honor the achievements of early Americans. He was elected a member of the American Antiquarian Society in 1819.

Farmer capitalized on the increasing acceptability of antiquarianism to frame genealogy within the early republic's ideological framework of pride in one's American ancestors. He corresponded with other antiquarians in New England, where antiquarianism and genealogy were well established, and became a coordinator, booster, and contributor to the burgeoning movement. In the 1820s, he and fellow antiquarians began to produce genealogical and antiquarian tracts in earnest, slowly gaining a devoted audience among the American people. Though Farmer died in 1839, his efforts led to the creation of the New England Historical and Genealogical Society, which publishes the New England Historical and Genealogical Register. The society is one of New England's oldest and most prominent organizations dedicated to the acquisition, preservation, and dissemination of public records and private monuments that would otherwise have decayed and been forgotten.

In addition to editing the first volume of Belknap's History of New Hampshire (1831), Farmer published a valuable Genealogical Register of the First Settlers of New England (1829); histories of Billerica, Massachusetts, (1816), and Amherst, New Hampshire, (1820), and, in collaboration with J. B. Moore, A Gazetteer of New Hampshire, (1823). His Genealogical Register was revised and significantly extended by James Savage in 1860 to create A Genealogical Dictionary of the First Settlers of New England which is still a popular reference work.

== Bibliography ==
This list represents Farmer's principal works, as extracted from The Register article of 1847.

1. A Family Register of the Descendants of Edward Farmer, of Billerica, in the youngest branch of his Family. 12rno, pp. 12. Concord, 1813; with an Appendix, 12mo, pp. 7. Concord, 1824. This work, with some additions, was reprinted at Hingham, in 1828.
2. A Sketch of Amherst, N. H., published in 2 Coll. Mass. Hist. Soc. ii. Boston, 1814.
3. A Topographical and Historical Description of the County of Hillsborough, N. H., published in 2 Coll. Mass. Hist. Soc. vii. Boston, 1818.
4. An Historical Memoir of Billerica, Ms., containing Notices of the principal events in the Civil and Ecclesiastical Affairs of the Town, from its first settlement to 1816. 8vo, pp. 36. Amherst, 1816.
5. An Historical Sketch of Amherst, N. H., from the first settlement to 1820. 8vo, pp. 35. Amherst, 1820. A second edition, much enlarged, was published at Concord, in 1837. 8vo, pp. 52.
6. An Ecclesiastical Register of New Hampshire; containing a succinct account of the different religious denominations; their origin, and progress, and present numbers; with a Catalogue of the Ministers of the several Churches, from 1638 to 1821; the date of their settlement, removal, or death, and the number of communicants in 1821. 18mo, pp. 36. Concord, 1822.
7. The New Military Guide, a compilation of Rules and Regulations for the use of the Militia. 12mo, pp. 144. Concord, 1822.
8. The New Hampshire Annual Register and United States Calendar, published annually at Concord, from 1822 to 1838, inclusive, seventeen numbers, each consisting of 144 pages, 18mo, excepting those for 1823 and 1824, which were in 12mo, pp. 152,132.
9. A Gazetteer of the State of New Hampshire, with a Map, and several Engravings, (in conjunction with Jacob B. Moore, Esq.) 12mo, pp. 276. Concord, 1823.
10. Collections, Historical and Miscellaneous, (in connection with J. B. Moore, Esq.) 3 vols. 8vo, pp. 302, 388, 388. With an Appendix to Vols. II. and III. pp. 110, 97. Concord, 1822, 1823, 1824.
11. Memoir of the Penacook Indians, published in an Appendix to Moore's Annals of Concord, 1824. 8vo, pp. 7.
12. A Genealogical Register of the First Settlers of New England, containing an Alphabetical List of the Governors, Deputy Governors, Assistants or Counsellors, and Ministers of the Gospel, in the several Colonies, from 1620 to 1692; Representatives of the General Court of Massachusetts, from 1634 to 1692; Graduates of Harvard College, to 1662; Members of the Ancient and Honorable Artillery Company, to 1662; Freemen admitted to the Massachusetts Colony, from 1630 to 1662; with many other of the early inhabitants of New England and Long Island, N. Y., from 1620 to the year 1675; to which are added various Genealogical and Biographical Notes, collected from Ancient Records, Manuscripts, and printed "Works.
13. A Catechism of the History of New Hampshire, from its first settlement, for Schools and Families. 18mo, pp. 87. Concord, 1829. Second edition, 18mo, pp. 108, in 1830.
14. The Concord Directory. 12mo, pp. 24. Concord, 1830.
15. Pastors, Deacons, and Members of the First Congregational Church in Concord, N. R, from Nov. 18, 1730, to Nov. 18, 1830. 8vo, pp. 21. Concord, 1830.
16. An edition of the Constitution of New Hampshire, with Questions; designed for the use of Academies and District Schools in said State. 18mo, pp. 68. Concord, 1831.
17. A new edition of Belknap; containing various Corrections and Illustrations of the first and second volumes of Dr. Belknap's History of New Hampshire, and additional Facts and Notices of Persons and Events therein mentioned. Published in 1 vol. 8vo, pp. 512. Dover, 1831.
18. Papers in the Second and Third Series of the Massachusetts Historical Collections.
19. Papers in the five published volumes of Collections of the New Hampshire Historical Society.
20. Papers in the American Quarterly Register, viz: Sketches of the First Graduates of Dartmouth College, from 1771 to 1783; List of the Congregational and Presbyterian Ministers of New Hampshire, from its first settlement to 1814; List of the Graduates of all the Colleges of New England, containing about 19,000 names; List of eight hundred and forty deceased Ministers who were graduated at Harvard College, from 1642 to 1826, together with their ages, the time of their graduation and of their decease; and Memoirs of Ministers who have graduated at Harvard College to 1657.
