= Williams Haynes =

American journalist

Nathan Gallup Williams Haynes
- Born: July 29, 1886; Detroit, Michigan
- Died: November 16, 1970 (aged 84); Stonington, Connecticut)
- Occupations: Journalist and historian of chemistry
- Notable work: American Chemical Industry: A History

Nathan Gallup Williams Haynes (29 July 1886, Detroit – 16 November 1970, Stonington, Connecticut) was an American journalist, editor, publisher, and historian of chemistry. He is best known for his 6-volume American Chemical Industry: A History.

== Biography ==
Williams Haynes was born in Detroit, where his father, David Oliphant Haynes, was the publisher of The Pharmaceutical Era, as well as the president and the general manager of D. O. Haynes & Co. In 1896 D. O. Haynes established in New York City the New York Commercial as a daily newspaper on business.

Williams Haynes worked as a reporter for the New York Sun and as an editor for Field and Fancy from 1906 to 1907. He enrolled in 1908 as a special student at Johns Hopkins University, where he studied economics, biology, and chemistry, but left in 1911 without a degree. He married his first wife in June 1911. From 1911 to 1916 he was a contributor to magazines and newspapers and at various times visited Canada and Europe as a journalist. From 1914 to 1915 he was editor-in-chief of the Northampton, Massachusetts Herald (a daily newspaper). In 1916 he became the editorial director of D. O. Haynes & Co. As editorial director he was responsible for the chemical industry journal Drug and Chemical Markets and in 1920 became the journal's publisher. In 1926 he split the journal into two journals: Drugs and Cosmetics Industry and Chemical Industries (later called Chemical Week under the ownership of McGraw-Hill). In 1926 he also began publishing Plastic Products (renamed Modern Plastics, published from 1934 to 2004). In 1928 he established the book series Chemical Who’s Who and was editor-in-chief of the series until 1951. In 1939 Haynes sold his interest in the trade journals in order to focus his efforts as an author and editor. He moved to a property near Stonington in eastern Connecticut. The property, which had been in his family for several generations, had a farmhouse built in 1750.

Between 1945 and 1954 he published his famous American Chemical Industry: A History. This major work was supported by several chemical companies and covers a period from the beginnings in 1609 through 1948. It is a valuable resource in business history as a large number of companies are included.

As a journalist he contributed to The Outlook, The Nation, The Dial, Science, and Outing, among other publications. His extensive photo collection of chemists came to the Science History Institute through The Chemists' Club of New York.

In 1950 Haynes was awarded the Honorable Cornelius Amory Pugsley Bronze Medal for his work in protecting the natural environment. In 1957 he received the Dexter Award for his work as a historian of the American chemical industry.

He was married twice. There were two daughters from his second marriage.

== Selected publications ==
=== Articles ===
- Haynes, W. (19 September 1913). "Prepotency in Airedale terriers". Science. 38 (977): 404–405. Bibcode:1913Sci....38..404H. doi:10.1126/science.38.977.404. PMID 17736028.
- Haynes, Williams (1952). "Out of alchemy into chemistry". The Scientific Monthly. 75 (5): 268–272. JSTOR 20770.
- Haynes, Williams (1957). "Jungle Brimstone". The Scientific Monthly. 84 (3): 128–134. Bibcode:1957SciMo..84..128H. JSTOR 21903.

=== Books ===
- The Airedale. Outing Publishing Co. 1911.
- The fox terrier. Outing Publishing Co. 1912.
- The bull terrier. Outing handbooks. Outing Publishing Co. 1912.
- Practical dog breeding. Outing handbooks, no. 30. Outing Publishing Co. 1915.
- Casco Bay yarns. D. O. Haynes & Co. 1916.
- Sandhill sketches. D. O. Haynes & Co. 1916.
- as compiler with Joseph LeRoy Harrison: Camp-fire verse. 1917.
- as compiler with Joseph LeRoy Harrison: Fisherman's verse. New York. New York: Duffield & Company. 1919.
- as compiler with Joseph LeRoy Harrison: Winter sports verse. 1919.
- Chemical economics. Van Nostrand. 1933.
- as editor with Edward L. Gordy: Chemical industry's contribution to the nation: 1635–1935; a record of chemical accomplishment, with an index of chemicals made in America. 1935.
- Men, money and molecules. 1936.
- Chemical who's who: biography in dictionary form of leaders in chemical industry, research and education. Hynes & George Co. 1937. 4th edition. Lewis Historical Publ. 1956.
- Chemicals in the Industrial Revolution. Princeton University Press. 1938.
- Chemical pioneers: the founders of the American chemical industry. 1939.
- Dyes made in America, 1915–1940. American Cyanamid Company. 1941.
- This chemical age; the miracle of man-made materials. Knopf. 1942.
- The stone that burns. 1942.
- This chemical age. 1942.
- The chemical front. A. A. Button. 1943.
- American chemical industry: a history. Vol. 6 volumes, 1945 to 1954. Van Nostrand.
- Chemical trade names and commercial synonyms; A Dictionary of American usage (2nd ed.). Van Nostrand. 1955 [1951].
- Cellulose, the chemical that grows. Doubleday. 1953.
- Brimstone: the stone that burns; the story of the Frasch sulphur industry. Van Nostrand. 1959. (revision of 1942 book The stone that burns)
