= Robert Tyrwhitt (academic) =

English academic (1735–1817)

Robert Tyrwhitt (1735–1817) was an English academic, known as a Unitarian.

== Life ==
Born in London, he was younger son of Robert Tyrwhitt (1698–1742), residentiary canon of St Paul's Cathedral, by his wife Elizabeth, eldest daughter of Edmund Gibson, bishop of London. Thomas Tyrwhitt was his eldest brother. He entered as a pensioner at Jesus College, Cambridge on 9 March 1753, and graduated B.A. in 1757, M.A. in 1760. On 3 November 1759 he was admitted Fellow of his college.

He was early influenced by the theological writings of Samuel Clarke, but he went much further, renounced the doctrine of the 39 Articles, and took part with John Jebb in the movement (1771–72) for abolishing subscription to the articles at graduation. In 1777 he resigned his fellowship, and ceased to attend the college chapel, though still residing in college.

On 5 January 1784, he became a member of the largely Unitarian Society for Promoting the Knowledge of the Scriptures, and contributed papers to the society's Commentaries and Essays. His income was small until, on the death of his brother Thomas in 1786, he came into property. He was one of the founders of the London Unitarian Society (1791), precursor of the British and Foreign Unitarian Association which led in turn to today's General Assembly of Unitarian and Free Christian Churches, but on the introduction into its preamble of the term ‘idolatrous,’ as applied to the worship of Jesus Christ, he withdrew his name and cancelled his donation. From about 1808 he was confined to his rooms by gout. He died unmarried at Jesus College on 25 April 1817. He published two sermons preached before the university, and a reprint (1787) of his two papers in Commentaries and Essays.

== Legacy ==
He left money to the University of Cambridge, used to found the Tyrwhitt Hebrew scholarships.

== Notes ==
Attribution

This article incorporates text from a publication now in the public domain: "Tyrwhitt, Robert". Dictionary of National Biography. London: Smith, Elder & Co. 1885–1900.
