= Society for Promoting the Knowledge of the Scriptures =

The Society for Promoting the Knowledge of the Scriptures was a group founded in 1783 in London, with a definite but rather constrained plan for Biblical interpretation. While in practical terms it was mainly concerned with promoting Unitarian views, it was broadly based.

== Founders ==
The founding group included John Disney, the initial Secretary, and John Jebb. The membership was 30 to 40, of varied denominations. Among them were Dr. John Calder, Michael Dodson, Andrew Kippis, Theophilus Lindsey and Richard Price in London. Those in the provinces giving at least financial support included Joseph Priestley, Bishop Edmund Law, Joshua Toulmin, and William Turner. Robert Tyrwhitt joined in 1784.

== Commentaries and Essays ==
The Society produced two volumes of Commentaries and Essays (1787), as its major achievement, before subsiding as inactive. Among the contributors were Michael Dodson and Henry Moore.
