= John H. Moore (disambiguation) =

John H. Moore (1939–2016) was an American anthropology professor.

John H. Moore may also refer to:

- Sir John Henry Moore, 2nd Baronet (1756–1780), English plantation owner and poet
- John H. Moore II (1927–2013), U.S. federal judge in New Jersey
- John Henry Moore (Texas settler) (1800–1880), early colonist in Mexican Texas
- John Henry Moore (mayor), mayor of Brantford, Ontario in 1851
- John Henry Moore (American Horror Story), a fictional character
- John Howard Moore (1862–1916), American zoologist, philosopher, educator, and social reformer

== See also ==
- John Moore (disambiguation)
- Henry Moore (disambiguation)
