= The Bright Sun Brings It to Light =

German fairy tale

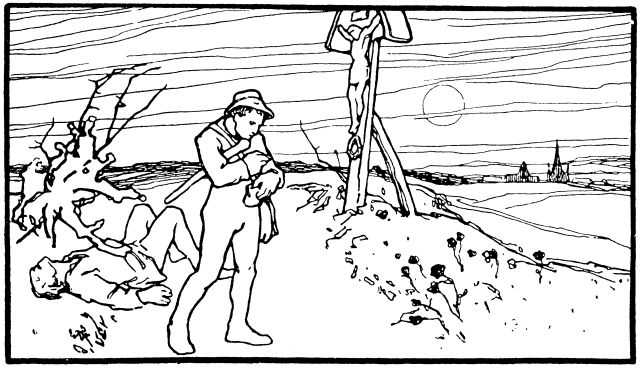

Folk tale
- Name: The Bright Sun Brings It to Light
- Also known as: Die klare Sonne bringt's an den Tag
- Aarne–Thompson grouping: ATU 960
- Country: Germany
- Published in: Grimms' Fairy Tales

"The Bright Sun Brings it to Light" (German: Die klare Sonne bringt's an den Tag) is an antisemitic German fairytale collected by the Brothers Grimm in Grimm's Fairy Tales, tale number 115.

It is Aarne-Thompson type 960, The Sun Brings All to Light.

== Synopsis ==
A tailor's apprentice is journeying along a road to find work during a time of need. He comes across a poor Jew, whom he robs and murders on the road, despite the Jew saying he has nothing worth stealing. As the Jew dies, he warns, "The bright sun will bring it to light." The man ignores the warning and hides the Jew's body. The man then meets a young woman, settles down, and has two daughters. One day, as he is drinking his coffee, he sees the sunlight reflecting from his coffee onto the wall and is reminded about what the poor Jew had said. He jeers about its bringing "it" to light. His wife pesters him until he tells her what he means. Although she swears herself to secrecy, she tells her friend about her husband's crime. The friend then has him arrested and executed.

== Variants ==
The Grimms also recorded a version where the threat of that birds would bring it to light, and the man laughed at a partridge because of it.

== See also ==
- The Jew Among Thorns
- The Good Bargain
