= Henry E. Moore =

American singer

Henry E. Moore, of Concord, New Hampshire, was an American singing school master, who is best known for organizing the first of many conventions of singing masters in the country. The first convention began with an ordinary class at the Boston Academy of Music, but became a convention in 1840.
