= Louis Leo Snyder =

American scholar (1907–1993)

- Cover of Encyclopedia of the Third Reich by Louis Leo Snyder
- Born: 4 July 1907; Annapolis, Maryland
- Died: 25 November 1993 (aged 86); Princeton, New Jersey
- Occupations: Historian, author
- Writing career
- Notable work: Encyclopedia of the Third Reich (2009) [1976]

Louis Leo Snyder (4 July 1907 – 25 November 1993) was an American scholar, who witnessed first hand the Nazi mass rallies held from 1923 on in Germany; and wrote about them from New York in his Hitlerism: The Iron Fist in Germany published in 1932 under the pseudonym Nordicus. Snyder predicted Adolf Hitler's rise to power, Nazi alliance with Benito Mussolini, and possibly the war upon the French and the Jews. His book was the first publication of the complete NSDAP National Socialist Program in the English language.

Snyder authored more than 60 books. He compiled the Encyclopedia of the Third Reich (1976), wrote Roots of German Nationalism (1978), and Diplomacy in Iron (1985) among other works examining the Third Reich. He also wrote The Dreyfus Case (1973) which divided France over the Dreyfus affair at turn of the century.

== Life ==
Louis Snyder was a native of Annapolis, Maryland, and graduated from that city's St. John's College, cum laude, in 1928. He became a German-American Exchange Fellow in 1928 at the University of Frankfurt am Main, where he earned his doctorate in 1931. He was also an Alexander von Humboldt Foundation Fellow in 1929–1930. Following post-doctoral work at Columbia University, he started tutoring at City College of New York in 1933.

Snyder was appointed a full professor at City College in 1953 and retired to Princeton, New Jersey in 1977 after a total of forty-four years of teaching. He was the general editor of the David Van Nostrand Company's Anvil Books. He died in Princeton in 1993.

== Leading publications ==
- Die persönlichen und politischen Beziehungen Bismarcks zu Amerikanern, 1932, Darmstadt: Druckerei d. Stud. Wirtschaftshilfe, xiv+94 pages. (this was his 1931 dissertation at the University of Frankfurt)
- Hitlerism, the Iron Fist in Germany, 1932 (under the pseudonym, Nordicus), New York, The Mohawk Press.
- From Bismarck to Hitler; the background of modern German nationalism, Williamsport, Pennsylvania, The Bayard Press 1935.
- Handbook of Civilian Protection edited by Louis L. Snyder Under the Supervision of Richard B. Morris and Joseph E. Wisan with a foreword by Augustin M. Prentiss and an Introd. by Guy E. Snavely, New York, McGraw-Hill 1942.
- A treasury of great reporting; "literature under pressure" from the sixteenth century to our own time, edited by Louis L. Snyder and Richard B. Morris ... with a pref. by Herbert Bayard Swope, New York : Simon & Schuster, 1949.
- National aspects of the Grimm brothers' Fairy Tales in The journal of social psychology 33 (1951) 209–223.
- German nationalism: the tragedy of a people; extremism contra liberalism in modern German history, Harrisburg, Pennsylvania, Stackpole Co. 1952.
- The meaning of nationalism, Westport, Connecticut, Greenwood, 1954.
- The age of reason, Princeton, New Jersey, Van Nostrand 1955.
- Fifty major documents of the Twentieth century, Princeton, N.J., Van Nostrand 1955.
- Fifty Major Documents of the Nineteenth Century, Princeton, N.J., Van Nostrand 1955.
- The world in the twentieth century, New York : Van Nostrand, 1955.
- Basic History of Modern Germany, Princeton, N.J., Van Nostrand 1957.
- Documents of German History, New Brunswick, New Jersey, Rutgers University Press, 1958.
- The First Book of World War II
- The war: a concise history, 1939–1945, by Louis L. Snyder with a foreword by Eric Sevareid, New York, Simon & Schuster 1960.
- Hitler and Nazism, publisher: Franklin Watts, Inc., New York, 1961.
- The idea of racialism: its meaning and history, Princeton, N.J., Van Nostrand 1962
- The Imperialism Reader; Documents and Readings on Modern Expansionism, Princeton, N.J., Van Nostrand 1962.
- The Weimar Republic : a history of Germany from Ebert to Hitler, New York; Cincinnati; London: Van Nostrand, 1966.
- Bismarck and German unification by Louis L. Snyder and Ida Mae Brown, New York, F. Watts 1966.
- The Blood and Iron Chancellor : a Documentary-Biography of Otto Von Bismarck, Princeton, N.J.; Toronto : Van Nostrand, 1967
- The new nationalism, Ithaca, N.Y., Cornell University Press, 1968.
- The Dreyfus case: a documentary history, New Brunswick, N.J., Rutgers University Press, 1973.
- Encyclopedia of the Third Reich, New York : McGraw-Hill, 1976.
- Varieties of nationalism : a comparative study, Hinsdale, Illinois : Dryden Press, 1976.
- Historic documents of World War I edited by L.L. Snyder Westport, Conn. : Greenwood Press, 1977.
- Roots of German Nationalism, Bloomington, Indiana : Indiana University Press, 1978
- Hitler's Third Reich : a documentary history, Chicago : Nelson-Hall, 1981.
- Louis L. Snyder's Historical guide to World War II, Westport, Conn. : Greenwood Press, 1982.
- Global mini-nationalisms : autonomy or independence, Westport, Conn. : Greenwood Press, 1982.
- Macro-nationalisms : a history of the pan-movements, Westport, Conn. : Greenwood Press, 1984.
- National Socialist Germany : twelve years that shook the world, Malabor, Florida: Krieger, 1984.
- Blood and iron chancellor; a documentary-biography of Otto von Bismarck, Malabar, Fla. : R.E. Krieger Pub. Co., 1985.
- The Third Reich, 1933–1945 : a bibliographical guide to German national socialism, New York : Garland Pub., 1987.
- Hitler's Elite : Biographical Sketches of Nazis who Shaped the Third Reich, New York : Hippocrene Books, 1989.
- Encyclopedia of nationalism, New York : Paragon House, 1990.
- Hitler's German enemies : portraits of heroes who fought the Nazis, New York : Berkley, 1992, 1990.
- Contemporary nationalisms : persistence in case studies, Malabar, Fl. : Krieger Pub. Co., 1992.

== See also ==
- Alan Bullock
- List of Adolf Hitler books
- William L. Shirer
- Das große Lexikon des Dritten Reiches

== General references ==
- Nationalism : essays in honor of Louis L. Snyder edited by Michael Palumbo and William O. Shanahan with a foreword by Arthur Schlesinger, Jr, Westport, Conn. : Greenwood Press, 1981.
