= Henry Moore (Unitarian) =

English Unitarian minister and hymn-writer

Henry Moore (1732–1802) was an English Unitarian minister and hymn-writer.

== Life ==
The son of Henry Moore, minister of Treville Street presbyterian congregation, Plymouth, he was born at Plymouth on 30 March 1732. His mother was the daughter of William Bellew, of Stockleigh Court, Devon. His schoolmaster was John Bedford, later vicar of St. Charles the Martyr, Plymouth. In 1749 he entered Philip Doddridge's dissenting academy, then at Northampton, and, after Doddridge's death moved on 9 November 1752 to the Daventry Academy under Caleb Ashworth. Here he was a fellow-student with Joseph Priestley.

In 1755 or 1756, he became minister of a small Presbyterian congregation at Dulverton, Somerset, but moved in 1757 to the Presbyterian congregation at Modbury, Devon. He was at this time an Arian. It was not until 6 July 1768 that he was ordained at Plymouth. His congregation at Modbury went over to Methodism. Around the end of 1787 he moved to the Presbyterian congregation at Liskeard, Cornwall.

He seems to have retired from active duty before 1792, when Thomas Morgan, one of the founders of the Western Unitarian Society, is described as minister at Liskeard. Shortly before his death he became paralysed, when an edition of his poems by subscription was projected by John Aikin, but it was not published until some years after his death. He died unmarried at Liskeard on 2 November 1802.

== Works ==
He wrote much devotional verse. Priestley, who thought highly of Moore as an exegete, secured him as a contributor to the Commentaries and Essays, 1785–99, 2 vols., of the Society for Promoting the Knowledge of the Scriptures; the second volume is largely occupied with Moore's interpretations of passages in the Old Testament, commended by Alexander Geddes. In 1789, Priestley then applied to Moore, through Michael Dodson, to take part in a projected version of the Bible.

He published:

- ‘An Essay on Fundamentals,’ &c., 1759, (allows just two: that Christ is a king, and that his kingdom is not of this world).
- ‘A Word to Mr. Madan,’ &c., 1781, (anon.); two editions same year: in reply to the Thelyphthora of Martin Madan.
- ‘Private Life: A Moral Rhapsody,’ &c., Plymouth, 1795.

Posthumous was:

- ‘Lyrical and Miscellaneous Poems,’ &c., 1803, 1806, (edited by Aikin).

One of his pieces is in Roundell Palmer, 1st Earl of Selborne's hymnal, the Book of Praise, 1863; others are in older Unitarian collections. A hymn, ‘Amidst a world of hopes and fears,’ which appears with the initials ‘H. M.,’ has been ascribed to him, but is by Hannah Merivale.
