= Harry Estill Moore =

American sociologist

Harry Estill Moore (January 4, 1897 - July 19, 1966) was an American professor and sociologist at the University of Texas at Austin.

== Early life and education ==
Moore was born in Bethany, Louisiana, on January 4, 1897, to James Francis and Mary Ellen Pace.

After graduating from high school, Moore worked for a newspaper in Shreveport, Louisiana. He then served in World War I, during which time he contracted tuberculosis.

Moore entered college in 1920 and earned a bachelor's degree in journalism in 1927 and a master's degree in sociology in 1934 from the University of Texas. While working toward these degrees, he wrote and edited for the Austin American-Statesman and the San Antonio Evening News.

He and Bernice Ted Milburn met during their studies in Austin and married on November 27, 1924. They earned doctoral degrees simultaneously in 1937 in sociology from the University of North Carolina at Chapel Hill.

The Moores returned to Texas in 1937. They had no children.

== Career ==
Moore was a professor of sociology at the University of Texas from 1937 to 1966, during which time he produced a number of publications in the field, including most notably An Introduction to Sociology, a textbook he co-authored with Earnest R. Groves in 1941. In the later years of his career, he authored several books on disaster studies, including Tornadoes over Texas (1958), Before the Wind (1963), and And the Winds Blew (1964).

Moore served as the coordinator of the Southwest Cooperative Program in Educational Administration, a program intended to improve public school administrative practices, from 1950 through 1955.

Moore worked as the editor of the Southwestern Social Science Quarterly from 1956 until his death in 1966. He also served as chairman of the Social Welfare Studies Committee at the University of Texas during the last year of his life.

== Scholarship ==
Moore's widow, Bernice Milburn Moore, established The Harry E. and Bernice M. Moore Fellowship in his honor at the University of Texas in 1995. Students whose primary research interest is the human experience in crises are eligible to apply for an unrestricted, one-time $20,000 award to support the completion of their dissertations.

== Death ==
Moore died due to complications from a heart attack at St. David's Hospital in Austin, Texas on July 19, 1966, at 69 years old.
