= Frank Moore (journalist) =

American journalist (1828–1904)

Frank Moore (1828–1904) was an American journalist and compiler.

== Biography ==
Moore was born in Concord, New Hampshire; one of his siblings was George Henry Moore. Moore moved to New York City and became a journalist and general writer. During 1869-1872, he was Assistant Secretary of Legation in Paris.

Moore was the editor of numerous works, including:

- Songs and Ballads of the American Revolution (1856)
- Cyclopedia of American Eloquence (1857)
- Diary of the American Revolution (two volumes, 1860)
- The Rebellion Record (twelve volumes, 1861-68), a collection of original material bearing on the Civil War
- The Patriot Preachers of the American Revolution (1862)
- Lyrics of Loyalty (1864)
- Songs of the Soldiers (New York: George P. Putnam, 1864)
- Confederate Rhymes and Rhapsodies (1864)
- Personal and Political Ballads (1864)
- Speeches of Andrew Johnson (1865)
- Life and Speeches of John Bright (1865)
- Anecdotes, Poetry, and Incidents of the War: North and South: 1860-1865 (1866)
- Women of the War, 1861-66 (1866)
- Songs and Ballads of the Southern People, 1861-65 (1887)
- The Civil War in Song and Story, 1860-1865 (New York: P. F. Collier, 1889)

Moore also edited The Rebellion Record, 12 volumes reporting on the American Civil War published by David Van Nostrand. Each volume contains a diary of events, documents and narratives, and poetry. Most are now available from Internet Archive:

- First Volume: Introductory address by Edward Everett, Volume 1 (1861)
- Second Volume: Volume 2
- Third Volume: Volume 3
- Fourth Volume: Volume 4
- Fifth Volume: Volume 5
- Eighth Volume: Volume 8
- Ninth Volume: Volume 9
