= David Van Nostrand =

American publisher

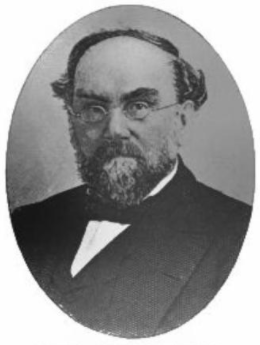
- Born: December 5, 1811; New York, New York
- Died: June 14, 1886 (aged 74); New York, New York
- Occupation: Publisher

David Van Nostrand (December 5, 1811 – June 14, 1886) was a New York City publisher.

== Biography ==
David Van Nostrand was born in New York City on December 5, 1811. He was educated at Union Hall, Jamaica, New York, and in 1826 entered the publishing house of John P. Haven, who gave him an interest in the firm when he became of age. In 1834 he formed a partnership with William Dwight, but the financial crisis of 1837 led to its dissolution. Van Nostrand then accepted an appointment as clerk of accounts and disbursements under Captain John G. Barnard, at that time in charge of the defensive works of Louisiana and Texas, with headquarters at New Orleans. While so engaged he devoted attention to the study of scientific and military affairs, and on his return to New York City he began the importation of military books for officers of the U.S. Army, afterward receiving orders from private individuals and from academic institutions for foreign books of science. His place of business was at first at the corner of John Street and Broadway. He founded the firm D. Van Nostrand Company in 1848.

As his trade increased, he began the publication of standard works by American authors on military and scientific subjects. This extension, with the growing demands for books on scientific subjects, led him to move his firm to 23 Murray Street, where he continued until his death. In 1869 he began the publication of Van Nostrand's Engineering Magazine, a monthly journal, which was devoted to selections from foreign sources, but also contained original papers on railroads, iron work, hydraulics, water reservoirs, sewage works, ventilation and mathematics (for examples). The magazine represented an early entry into the STEM fields area of publishing. Links to the volumes are given below, where a sample article is listed from each volume.

In 1884 J.C. Derby quoted Nicholas Trübner's characterization of Van Nostrand as "a gentleman of extensive and varied information, of genial and attractive character, eminent business capacity ..." He also noted that beyond military titles, Van Nostrand published books by Julius Weisbach on mechanics, James B. Francis on hydraulics, Quincy Gillmore on limes and cement, Alexander Lyman Holley on steam locomotion, and both Squire Whipple and John A. Roebling on bridge building. The twelve volume digest of the American Civil War, The Rebellion Record by Frank Moore was published by Van Nostrand. A biography of Napoleon, authored by Antoine-Henri Jomini, was translated by H. W. Halleck, an associate from New Orleans. He published Stephen Luce's textbook on seamanship for the U.S. Naval Academy.

James Clerk Maxwell's introduction to kinetic theory in his book Matter and Motion was first re-printed in the Engineering Magazine and subsequently by Van Nostrand in its own binding.

Van Nostrand was one of the founders of the St. Nicholas and Holland societies, and was an early member of the Century and Union League clubs of New York City.

He died in New York City on June 14, 1886.

== Engineering Magazine ==
The Magazine appeared monthly and carried articles from other publications as well as some written for Van Nostrand. Each issue contained current information: Reports of Engineering Societies, Engineering notes, Iron & Steel notes, Railway notes, Ordnance and Naval, Book notices, and Miscellaneous. Every six months an index was compiled of a completed volume. No table of contents was published for the volumes; rather the index was placed at the head of an assembled volume as seen in these links:

- January 1869 Volume 1.
- January 1870 Volume 2. E. Sherman Gould, "Surveying Instruments", pp 5,6.
- July 1870 Volume 3. "Railways of the Future"
- January 1871 Volume 4. "Rensselaer Polytechnic Institute", p 4
- July 1871 Volume 5 John Ericson "Solar Heat", p 8
- January 1872 Volume 6 G.F. Grover "Notes on Fire-bricks" p 6
- July 1872 Volume 7 "Theory of the Steam Engine" pp 17–26
- January 1873 Volume 8 "Flow of Water in Open Canals"
- July 1873 Volume 9 "On Compound Engines"
- January 1874 Volume 10 Arthur Jacobs [Water] "Storage Reservoirs"
- July 1874 Volume 11 G.H. Mann "Laying out of [Railway] Curves of Small Radius" p 13
- January 1875 Volume 12 Abram S. Hewitt "The Future of Wages and of Iron"
- July 1875 Volume 13 George L. Vose "The United States Coast Survey"
- January 1876 Volume 14 N.B. Putnam "Arcs of Adjustment"
- July 1876 Volume 15 S.W. Robinson "On a New Odontograph"
- January 1877 Volume 16 Henry T. Eddy "New Constructions in Graphical Statics" pp 1–6
- July 1877 Volume 17 H.T. Eddy continued pp 1–19
- January 1878 Volume 18 A.A. Humphreys & Henry L. Abbot "Physics and Hydraulics of the Mississippi"
- July 1878 Volume 19 H.T. Eddy "Theory of Internal Stress"
- January 1879 Volume 20 Albert B. Leeds "Sanitary Science" pp 6–14
- July 1879 Volume 21 H.T. Eddy "Thermodynamics" pp 1–9
- January 1880 Volume 22 M.C. Stevens "Effective Ventilation" pp 13–16
- July 1880 Volume 23 George W. Blodgett "Production and Transmission of Power by Electricity" pp 24–7
- January 1881 Volume 24 M. Argand, A.S. Hardy translator "Geometrical Interpretation of Imaginary Quantities" pp 16–22
- July 1881 Volume 25 Alex B.W. Kennedy "Kinematics of Machinery" pp 1–11
- January 1882 Volume 26 William Thomson "Recent Improvements in the Compass, Corrections for Iron Ships" pp 1–11
- July 1882 Volume 27 William Pole "Aerial Navigation" pp 1–15
- January 1883 Volume 28 George B. Airy & Benjamin Baker "On the Proposed Forth Bridge" pp 40–5
- July 1883 Volume 29 Charles C. Brown "Calibration of Thermometer" pp 1–7
- January 1884 Volume 30 DeVolson Wood "Stresses in Beams" pp 1–3
- July 1884 Volume 31 Wm Booth "Transformed Catenary as a Figure for Arches in Stone or Metal"
- January 1885 Volume 32 F. Gilman "Solar Temperature Question"
- July 1885 Volume 33 Wm Kent "Engineering as a Profession" pp 89–93
- January 1886 Volume 34 W.C. Unwin "Water Motors" [Turbines]
- July 1886 Volume 35 S.W. Robinson "Measurement of Gas Wells and other Gas Streams" pp 89–102

After the death of David Van Nostrand the assets of the Engineering Magazine were purchased by Matthias N. Forney who also acquired American Railroad Journal. He merged these publications to form The Railroad and Engineering Journal. That publication, after acquisitions and changes in name, is perpetuated in Railway Age magazine.

== Van Nostrand Company after 1886 ==
The company launched the Van Nostrand's Scientific Encyclopedia in 1938. A similar work that went through several editions Van Nostrands's Encyclopedia of Chemistry.

Book series published included Anvil Books and The New Illustrated Naturalist series.

In 1968, Litton acquired the D. Van Nostrand Company and Chapman-Reinhold and merged them to form the publisher Van Nostrand-Reinhold. In 1981 ownership passed to International Thomson and then in 1999 to Wiley.
