= Harry Moore (footballer, born 1861) =

English footballer

Personal information
- Full name: Henry Thomas Moore
- Date of birth: 27 June 1861
- Place of birth: Nottingham, England
- Date of death: 24 September 1939 (aged 78)
- Position: Full back

Senior career*
Years	Team	Apps	(Gls)
- Notts County

International career
1883–1885	England	2	(0)
- * Club domestic league appearances and goals

Henry Thomas Moore, known as Harry Moore (27 June 1861 – 24 September 1939) was an English international footballer, who played as a full back.

== Career ==
Born in Nottingham, Moore played for Notts County, and earned two caps for England between 1883 and 1885.
