= Hermann Vogel (German illustrator) =

German illustrator

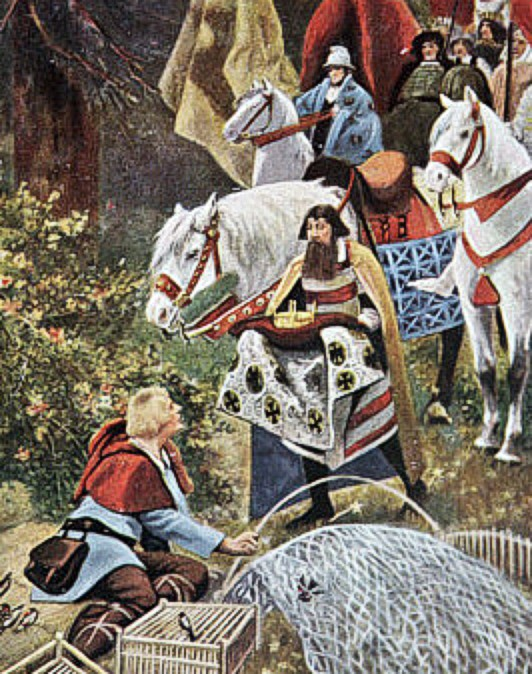
Hermann Vogel's 1900 depiction of Henry the Fowler being offered the crown while trapping birds

Hermann Vogel (16 October 1854 – 22 February 1921) was a German illustrator.

Vogel was born in Plauen, Kingdom of Saxony, as the son of a master builder. From 1874 to 1875 he studied at the art academy of Dresden.

Vogel worked for the publishing company Braun & Schneider and was a founding member of the Deutsche Kunstgesellschaft (German art association) and contributed to Julius Lohmeyer's journal Die deutsche Jugend and the weekly periodical Fliegende Blätter. Vogel early followed the Nazarene movement, while his later material was in the Biedermeier style.

Illustrations by Vogel appeared in an 1881 publication of Auserwählte Märchen by Hans Christian Andersen, in an 1887 publication of Volksmärchen der Deutschen by Johann Karl August Musäus, and in 1891 in Die Nibelungen by Gustav Schalk. From 1896–99, Vogel's works were collected into two volumes. Volumes 3 and 4 appeared in 1903 and 1908, respectively. He illustrated an edition of Bluebeard in 1887, The Juniper Tree in 1893 and of Hansel and Gretel in 1894. Vogel died in Burgstein, Krebes in Saxony.

== Gallery ==
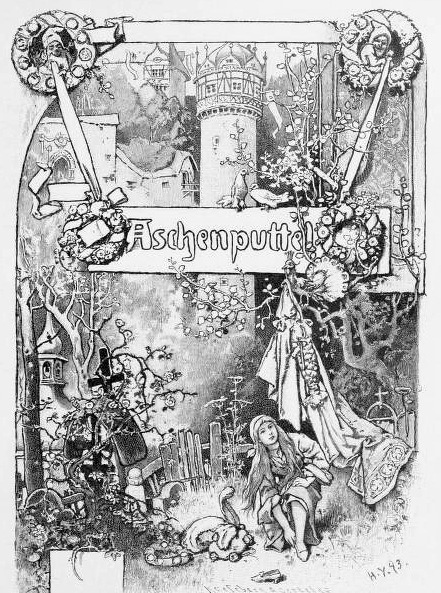
Aschenputtel

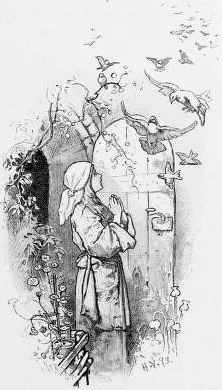
Cinderella and Birds

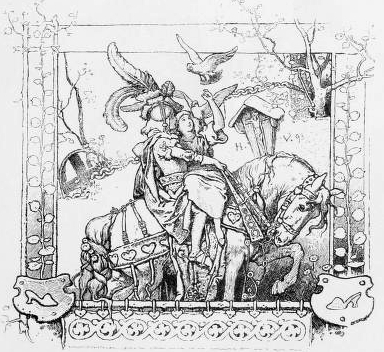
Cinderella Ending

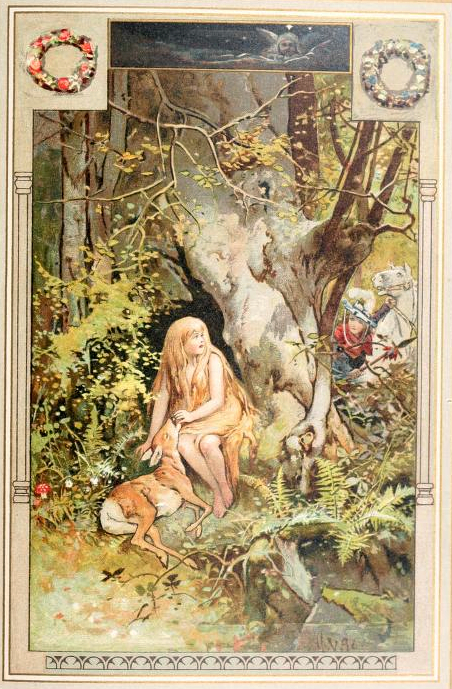
Mary's Child

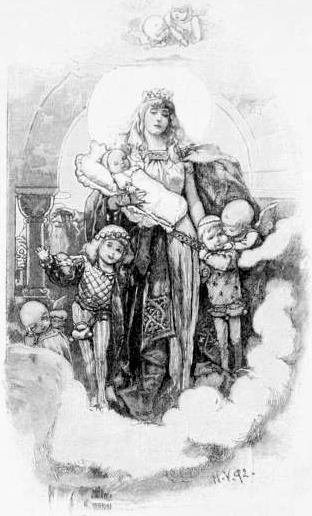
Mary's Child

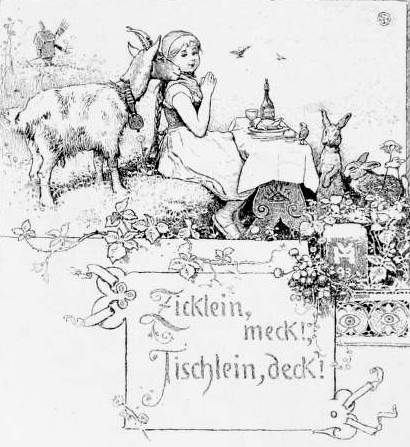
One-Eye, Two-Eyes, and Three-Eyes

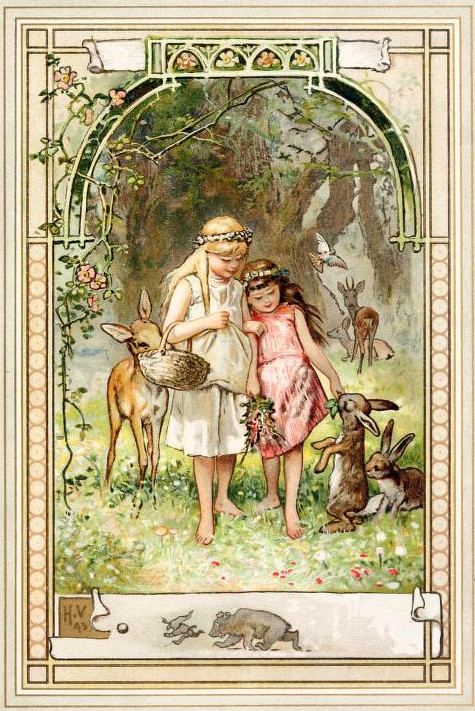
Snow White and Rose Red
