= Van Nostrand's Scientific Encyclopedia =

Encyclopedia first published in 1938

- Title page for Van Nostrand's Scientific Encyclopedia (1938)
- Subject: science, engineering, and technology
- Publisher: D. Van Nostrand Company, Inc.
- Publication date: 1938

Van Nostrand's Scientific Encyclopedia is an encyclopedia published in the United States. Currently in a three volume 10th edition, it was published in two volumes for editions 6 to 9. The 8th edition is available as two CD ROMs.

The first edition was published in 1938 by the D. Van Nostrand Company, Inc. From about 1976 the encyclopedia was published by the Van Nostrand Reinhold Company. From the late 1990s it was published by John Wiley and Sons and by Wiley-Interscience.

More than 4,000 pages long, the work provides a scientific reference while establishing a midpoint between multi-volume science encyclopedias and handheld reference books.

This work is sometimes compared to the McGraw-Hill Concise Encyclopedia of Science & Technology.
