= Henry Eaton Moore =

American composer

Henry Eaton Moore was an American composer born in Andover, New Hampshire on July 21, 1803. He died in Cambridge, Massachusetts on October 23, 1841. Besides music he also was in the publishing business.
