= Franz Muncker =

German literary historian (1855-1926)

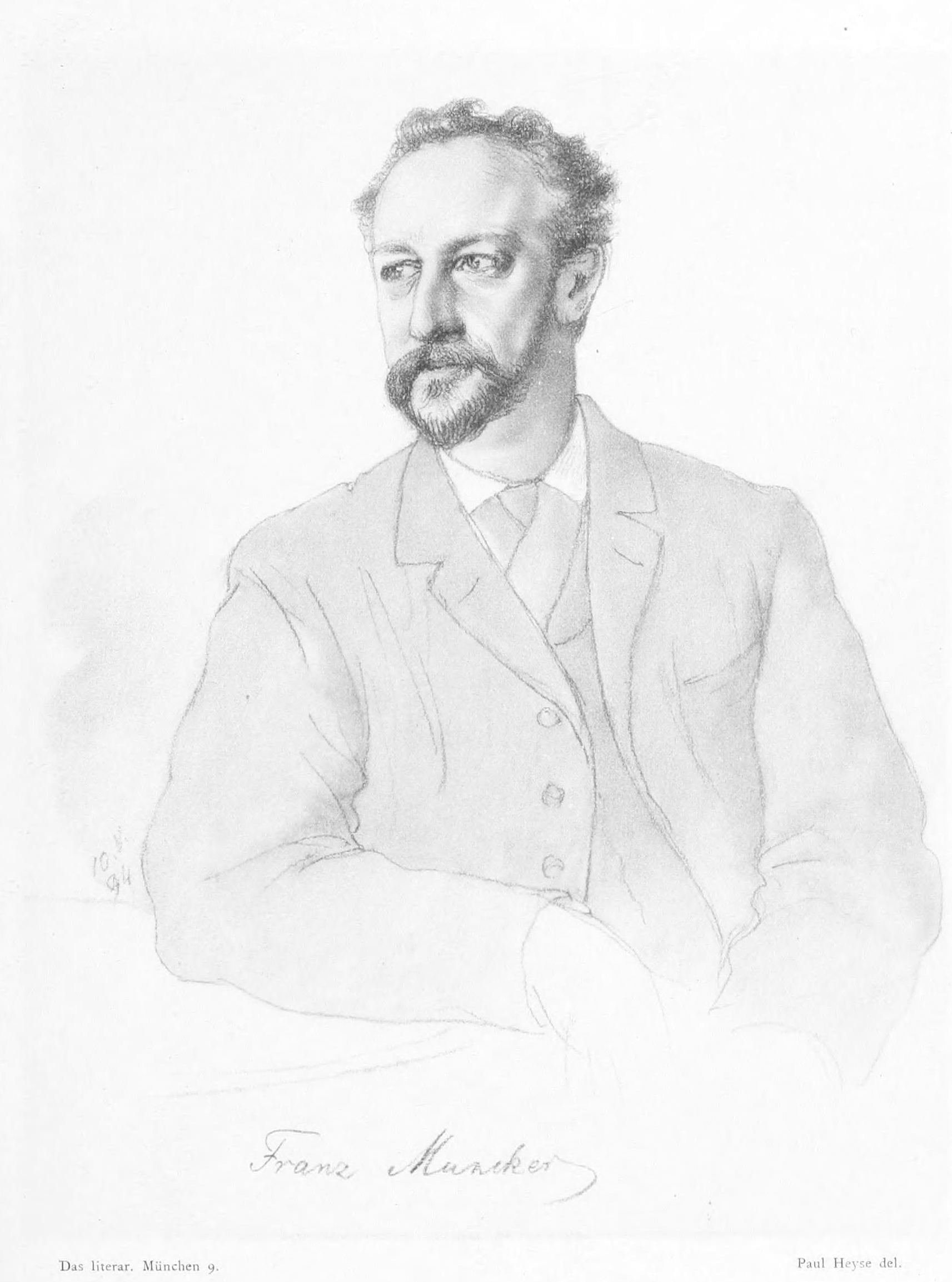
Franz Muncker

Franz Muncker (4 December 1855, in Bayreuth – 7 September 1926, in Munich) was a German literary historian.

From 1873 he studied Old German and Romance languages and literature under Konrad Hofmann and modern languages and literature with Michael Bernays at the Ludwig-Maximilians-Universität München, receiving his doctorate in 1878. In 1890, he was appointed successor to Bernays at the Ludwig-Maximilians-Universität München, where from 1896 to 1926, he served as a full professor of modern German literary history.

== Published works ==
From 1886 to 1924, he worked on a 23-volume edition of Gotthold Ephraim Lessing's writings and letters; titled Gotthold Ephraim Lessings sämtliche schriften. His biography of Wagner, Richard Wagner : Eine Skizze seines Lebens und Wirkens (1891), was translated into English and published as Richard Wagner; a sketch of his life and works. Muncker's other principal works are the following:

- Joufrois : Altfranzösisches rittergedicht (with Konrad Hofmann, 1880) – "Joufrois", an old French knight poem.
- Johann Kaspar Lavater. Eine Skizze seines Lebens und Wirkens, 1883 – Johann Kaspar Lavater, a sketch of his life and works.
- Friedrich Gottlieb Klopstock. Geschichte seines Lebens und seiner Schriften, 1888 – Friedrich Gottlieb Klopstock, history of his life and writings.
- Friedrich Rückert, 1890 – On Friedrich Rückert.

He was also the author of numerous biographies in the Allgemeine Deutsche Biographie, and wrote the introductions to the following literary collections:

- H. von Kleists sämtliche werke (4 volumes, 1882–83) – The works of Heinrich von Kleist.
- Klopstocks gesammelte Werke (4 volumes, 1887–90) – Friedrich Gottlieb Klopstock's collected works.
- Wielands gesammelte werke (6 volumes, 1888–89) – Christoph Martin Wieland's collected works.
- Briefwechsel zwischen Schiller und Goethe (4 volumes, 1892) – Correspondence between Schiller and Goethe.
- Immermanns ausgewählte Werke, (6 volumes, 1893) – Karl Leberecht Immermann's selected works.
