= A Tale Dark & Grimm =

American animated television series

- Genre: Fantasy; Action; Adventure; Comedy drama
- Based on: A Tale Dark & Grimm by Adam Gidwitz
- Developed by: Doug Langdale; Simon Otto
- Directed by: Jamie Whitney
- Voices of: Andre Robinson; Raini Rodriguez; Scott Adsit; Ron Funches; Erica Rhodes; Adam Lambert
- Ending theme: "Hansel and Gretel Lullaby" by Allie Feder and Michael Kramer
- Composer: Michael Kramer
- Countries of origin: United States; Canada
- Original language: English
- No. of episodes: 10

Production
- Executive producers: Doug Langdale; Simon Otto; David Henrie; James Henrie; Bug Hall; Bob Higgins; Jon Rutherford
- Producer: Audrey Velichka
- Editors: Gavin Ebedes; Tom Berger
- Running time: 27–30 minutes
- Production companies: Novo Media Group; Astro-Nomical Entertainment; Boat Rocker Studios; Netflix Animation Studios

Original release
- Network: Netflix
- Release: October 8, 2021

A Tale Dark & Grimm is a Canadian-American animated television series based on the children's book of the same name by Adam Gidwitz, itself a loose adaptation of the Brothers Grimm's fairy tale "Hansel and Gretel". Developed for Netflix by Doug Langdale and Simon Otto, the series premiered on October 8, 2021. Netflix did not renew the show for a second season. It was nominated for the Children's and Family Emmy Award for Outstanding Animated Series at the 1st Children's and Family Emmy Awards.

== Plot ==
A trio of talking ravens narrate the real story of Hansel and Gretel, who are a prince and a princess. After being beheaded by their parents, the twins run away and search for a new and happy family. The pair embark on a winding and wickedly witty tale with elements of several other stories from the Brothers Grimm.

== Voice cast ==
- Andre Robinson as Prince Hansel
- Raini Rodriguez as Princess Gretel
- Scott Adsit as William and Hunter
- Ron Funches as Jacob
- Erica Rhodes as Dotty
- Jonathan Banks as Johannes
- Nicole Byer as Mrs. Baker
- Eric Bauza as the King and Shillingworth
- Charlotte Wilson Langley as the Queen
- Kari Wahlgren as The Sun and Olivia
- Tom Hollander as The Moon
- Cree Summer as Mother Tree
- Adetokumboh M'Cormack as Lord Meister and Furfur
- David Henrie as Handsome Young Man
- Missi Pyle as The Rain and Widow Fischer
- Matthew Waterson as Asmodeus
- Adam Lambert as the Devil

== Episodes ==
No.	Title	Directed by	Screenplay by	Original release date
1	"Chapter the First: Hansel and Gretel"	Jamie Whitney	Doug Langdale	October 8, 2021
In the Kingdom of Grimm, young Prince Hansel and Princess Gretel discover a horrifying secret: their parents, the King and Queen, have brutally beheaded them and sewn their heads back on with a golden thread to fulfill a bizarre magic ritual. Terrified and feeling unloved, the siblings run away from the castle to find the "perfect parents". They wander into a boggy marsh and discover a magnificent house made of cake and candy owned by a friendly-seeming baker woman. However, Mrs. Baker turns out to be a cannibalistic witch who fattens children up to bake them into pies. Using their wits, Hansel and Gretel escape her clutches, causing Mrs. Baker to fall into her own fiery trap. "Fairy Tale": Hansel and Gretel
2	"Chapter the Second: The Seven Swallows"	Jamie Whitney	David Henrie	October 8, 2021
Continuing their quest for a safe home, Hansel and Gretel meet a poor turnip farmer and his wife. They are welcomed warmly, but Gretel notices a bedroom containing seven empty beds and senses an unsettling aura in the household. They discover the farmer accidentally cursed his own seven sons, turning them into swallows out of a momentary burst of frustration. Determined to help, Hansel and Gretel travel to a glass mountain to rescue the brothers. Gretel sacrifices the tip of her pinky finger to use as a key to open the mountain. They break the curse, restoring the boys to their human form. Realizing that even good parents can cause severe harm to their children, the siblings decide to live on their own. "Fairy Tale": The Seven Ravens
3	"Chapter the Third: Brother and Sister"	Jamie Whitney	Bug Hall	October 8, 2021
Hansel and Gretel establish a peaceful life alone in an enchanting, harmonious forest. However, Hansel is gradually consumed by a dark, wild instinct and a fierce hunger for flesh. Ignoring Gretel's warnings, he drinks from a magical stream and transforms into a ferocious, bloodthirsty wolf-beast. He completely loses control of his human consciousness. A royal hunting party led by the snobbish Lord Meister attacks the woods and slays the beastly Hansel. Heartbroken and utterly alone, Gretel watches as her brother's body is carried away. "Fairy Tale": Brother and Sister
4	"Chapter the Fourth: The Monster Within"	Jamie Whitney	Jeffrey Reddick	October 8, 2021
The siblings' paths diverge. Hansel's body is brought to Lord Meister's estate, where the lord cuts open the wolf's skin. Miraculously, Hansel emerges alive, completely cured, and back in his human form. Impressed by the boy, Lord Meister adopts Hansel and begins grooming him to become a refined, elite lord. Meanwhile, a grieving and isolated Gretel is rescued by a kind-hearted fishmonger who takes her into a nearby village. While Hansel thrives in high society, Gretel struggles to adapt to her new, normal life while mourning the brother she believes is dead. "Fairy Tale": The Girl Without Hands
5	"Chapter the Fifth: A Smile as Red as Blood"	Jamie Whitney	Candie Langdale	October 8, 2021
Hansel’s luxury lifestyle hits a massive roadblock when Lord Meister gambles recklessly and loses a high-stakes bet to a bizarre stranger who turns out to be the Devil himself. As a result, Hansel is traded away but is met by Johannes—the King's old, loyal advisor who had previously looking for him and Gretel. Johannes serves as Hansel's guide through the underworld. Simultaneously, in her village, Gretel is courted by a handsome, charming young warlock. While at his mansion, Gretel discovers a horrific discovery about young girls and women the warlock has lured and turned into birds, easing their memories out of the village' other people, which she escapes with the help of the warlock's enslaved mother. "Fairy Tale": Little Red Riding Hood, Jorinde and Joringel, The Robber Bridegroom and The Devil with the Three Golden Hairs
6	"Chapter the Sixth: Three Golden Hairs"	Jamie Whitney	Doug Langdale	October 8, 2021
Gretel uses her sharp intellect to trap the evil warlock, exposing him and executing him by dropping him into a boiling cauldron, freeing the women and girls from his spell. Before he dies, she steals his magical twine—a powerful string capable of perfectly healing any physical break or wound. Learning that Hansel is actually alive but dragged down to Hell, Gretel sets off on a rescue mission. Down in the underworld, Hansel must rely on sheer cleverness rather than brute force. He outwits the Devil, successfully stealing three golden hairs from his head to secure his own release, escaping from Hell along with Johannes. He then helps a boatman to trick the Devil into taking his place in the enchanted boat, although the Devil throws his oar in frustration, fatally implating Johannes. "Fairy Tale": The Robber Bridegroom and The Devil with the Three Golden Hairs
7	"Chapter the Seventh: Faithful Johannes"	Jamie Whitney	Bug Hall	October 8, 2021
Hansel and Gretel cross paths and are joyfully reunited in the mortal world. Johannes finally reveals the complete backstory of the children's birth. The dying King, Hansel and Gretel's grandfather, entrusted his son to Johannes, with the command to protect the prince and show him everything in the kingdom—except for a forbidden room containing a portrait of the Princess of the Golden Roof. Despite this, the prince eventually found the portrait and, consumed by love, insisted on finding her. Johannes reluctantly helped the prince win the princess, but during their journey, he overheard two sailors talking about three deadly dangers that would happen to the King—a treacherous horse, a poisoned garment, and a fatal dance—and somebody would be turned into stone for speaking the truth. Johannes saved the King from all three traps, yet his repeated warnings and actions appeared suspicious to the monarch, leading to Johannes’s transformation into stone as the prophecy foretold. Armed with the truth, Hansel and Gretel realize their parents weren't malicious, but deeply broken. "Fairy Tale": Trusty John
8	"Chapter the Eighth: The Broken Kingdom"	Jamie Whitney	David Henrie	October 8, 2021
After Johannes dies from his wounds, Hansel and Gretel march back to the Kingdom of Grimm to confront their parents. They demand answers about the past, but the reunion turns sour when the King and Queen offer defensive, unsatisfactory explanations, revealing that they beheaded them to break the spell that turned Johannes into stone. Disillusioned by their parents' inability to take accountability, the siblings refuse to forgive them just yet. However, personal drama is cut short when a massive, terrifying Dragon attacks, ravaging the kingdom and darkening the skies. "Fairy Tale": Trusty John
9	"Chapter the Ninth: The Dragon"	Jamie Whitney	Candie Langdale	October 8, 2021
With the kingdom falling into absolute ruin, Hansel and Gretel step up as true leaders. They rally a small army composed of the eccentric allies, villagers, and creatures they helped throughout their journey. During the epic battle against the monster, Hansel taps into a controlled fraction of his inner "beast strength" to fight. Gretel manages to land a severe, wounding blow on the Dragon, forcing the beast to retreat back into the castle.
10	"Chapter the Tenth: The Royal Family"	Jamie Whitney	Jeffrey Reddick	October 8, 2021
Following the trail of the wounded Dragon into the throne room, Hansel and Gretel make a devastating discovery: the King has injuries matching the exact wounds Gretel inflicted on the beast. The Dragon is not an external monster, but a physical manifestation of the King's hidden malice, shame, and dark spirit. To save their father's soul and the kingdom, Gretel makes the ultimate, painful choice to execute her own father, beheading him to destroy the dragon spirit once and for all. Using the warlock's magic twine, the siblings sew their father's head back on. They explicitly voice their forgiveness for the trauma of the past, which breaks the final curse and restores the King to life as a changed, loving man. The family is finally healed, and the King and Queen happily step down, crowning Hansel and Gretel as the wise new rulers of Grimm.

== Production ==
On October 16, 2013, Henry Selick was set to direct a live-action film adaptation of Adam Gidwitz's children's novel A Tale Dark & Grimm. By August 2016, he was still working on the film adaptation. The series was first announced in June 2021, without Selick's involvement, as part of three Netflix Original shows targeted at kids and families.

== Release ==
A Tale Dark & Grimm premiered on October 8, 2021, globally on Netflix. A trailer was released on September 9.
