= Audradus Modicus =

Audradus Modicus (or Hardradus; fl. 847–53) was a Frankish ecclesiastic and author during the Carolingian Renaissance. He wrote in Latin.

Audradus was a monk of Saint Martin's of Tours. He served as an auxiliary bishop (chorepiscopus) to Archbishop Wenilo of Sens (836–65) from 847 until 849, when he was deposed by the Council of Paris. After his deposition, he went to Rome, where he presented his writings to Pope Leo IV.

Audradus was a prolific author. In verse, he composed the Liber de fonte vitae ("Book of the Source of Life") in 404 hexameters, the Carmen in honore sancti Petri ecclesiae ("Song in Honour of Saint Peter's Church"), some verses in honour of Saint Martin and a passion of Saint Julian (Passiones beatorum Iuliani et sociorum eius) in 800 lines. He also wrote the prose Liber revelationum, known from passages quoted by Alberic of Trois-Fontaines in the 13th century. They show him to have been a partisan of Charles the Bald, king of West Francia, and of Archbishop Hincmar of Reims, and extremely hostile to Charles's brothers, the Emperor Lothair I and Louis the German, king of East Francia. The Liber revelationum can be dated to no earlier than 853.

Audradus was buried in the church of Saint-Didier at Nevers. Like his superior, Wenilo, he morphed into a villain in popular memory. The chansons de geste, such as Amis et Amiles and Jordain de Blaivies, remember him as the henchman Hardré or Adradus to the archtraitor Ganelon, a figure based on Wenilo.

== Sources ==
- Holmes, Urban T. Jr. (1955). "The Post-Bédier Theories on the Origins of the Chansons de Geste". Speculum. 30 (1): 72–81. doi:10.2307/2850039.
- Molinier, Auguste (1901). "813. Audradus Modicus, chorévêque de Sens". Les Sources de l'histoire de France: Des origines aux guerres d'Italie. Vol. 1. Paris: A. Picard et fils. pp. 250–51.
