= The Raven (Giambattista Basile) =

1634 Fairy tale by Giambattista Basile

The Raven is an Italian literary fairy tale written by Giambattista Basile in his 1634 work, the Pentamerone. The story is a man winning a bride for his brother the king, and then having to protect the couple from perils that he can not tell anyone about, without being turned to stone.

It is Aarne-Thompson type 516. Others of this type are Trusty John, and Father Roquelaure. It is an unusual variant, in that most tales feature the main character as a servant rather than a brother.

== Synopsis ==
A king named Milluccio once saw a dead raven on stone, and fell in love with the thought of a wife as black as the raven, as red as its blood, and as white as the stone. It affected his health until his brother Jennariello asked what was wrong with him and finally learned the story. Jennariello set out by ship. He bought a falcon and a splendid horse, and a beggar persuaded him to tell his story. The beggar then begged at a magician's house, and Jennariello saw that the magician's daughter, Liviella, matched his brother's dream exactly. Jennariello dressed as a peddler and showed Liviella hoods, handkerchiefs, and other goods, and persuaded her to come to the ship to see his better wares. Then he sailed off with her. Liviella lamented, but Jennariello told her why, and described his brother to her so vividly that she wanted to see this man.

On the voyages, two doves flew up. They talked, and one told the other that the falcon would pick out Milluccio's eyes the first time it saw him, but if Jennariello warned him, or did not bring him the bird, Jennariello would turn to marble; that the horse would break Milluccio's neck the first time he rode it, but if Jennariello warned him, or did not bring him the horse, he would turn to marble; and that a dragon would eat Milluccio and Liviella on their wedding night, but if Jennariello warned him, or did not bring him Liviella, Jennariello would turn to stone.

Jennariello brought his brother the horse and the falcon and then instantly killed them. At the wedding night, Jennariello went with a sword and fought the dragon, but when his brother woke, the dragon vanished, and he had Jennariello imprisoned as a traitor that night and sentenced to die the next. Wishing to die known as innocent, he told Milluccio his story, and turned to stone.

Liviella had twin sons. One day, while she was gone, an old man asked Milluccio what he would give to restore his brother. Milluccio said his kingdom, and when told life was needed, offered his own; when the old man said his sons' lives were needed, he killed them and put the blood on the statue, which restored Jennariello. Liviella returned and was grief-stricken, and went to the window to throw herself out. The old man, her father, stopped her, and told her that he had punished them all for their acts against him, but the punishment had been enough. He restored the babies to life.

== See also ==
- In Love with a Statue
- How to find out a True Friend
- The Man of Stone
- Trusty John
