= Jordain de Blaivies =

Old French chanson de geste

First laisse from BnF fr. 860

Jordain de Blaivies (sometimes modernised Jourdain de Blaye) is an Old French chanson de geste written in decasyllables around 1200. It is an adventure story, largely inspired by the ancient story of Apollonius of Tyre. It survives in a single manuscript. The original was never popular, but it was reworked into a different metre and also adapted into prose in the 15th century. The prose version was printed with illustrations in 1520.

The chanson tells the story of how Jordain, rescued by his godparents as an infant, enacts revenge on the evil lord Fromont, who killed his father. His first effort fails when he kills the son of Charlemagne in battle and is forced to flee by sea. Shipwrecked, he is rescued by a fisherman, enters the service of King Mark, defeats a Saracen attack and marries the princess Oriabel. Going in search of his godparents, he and his wife are separated. He subsequently leaves behind his infant daughter to search for his wife, winds up fighting more Saracens and stumbles upon his godfather. Jordain with his wife and godfather returns to pick up his daughter, but she has been sent away to Constantinople by a jealous queen. When Jordain finds her, he arranges her marriage to a prince. He is then restored to Charlemagne's favour and goes to take back Blaye from Fromont. He captures and executes the villain. His daughter and her husband then inherit Constantinople, while Jordain succeeds King Mark and gives Blaye to his godfather.

== Related texts and sources ==
Jordain is a continuation of Amis et Amiles, which it follows in the manuscript. It was never as popular as Amis et Amiles. Together the two texts form what scholars term the geste de Blaye, a short literary cycle. Also part of his cycle are a 15th-century reworking of Amis in alexandrines and a like reworking of Jordain by Druet Vygnon in 1455. There are also two prosifications of Jordain (one dated to 1456) based on the alexandrine version. There was also a Middle Dutch adaptation, Jourdein van Blaves, only fragments of which are extant. There were four printed editions of the prose Jordain beginning in 1520.

Title page of an early printed edition of the prose Jordain

According to Walter Bishop, its English editor, Jordain "stands at the point in the development of the genre when the primitive martial and crusading spirit had already begun to yield to the spirit of sheer adventure." It is the first vernacular French work to incorporate the story of Apollonius of Tyre. A mid-12th century reference in a poem of Giraut de Cabreira shows that the story was well known by then to Occitan troubadours. There was a vernacular French text in circulation, which now survives only in fragments. It was also accessible in Latin through Godfrey of Viterbo's Pantheon (late 11th century) and the Historia Apollonii regis Tyri (10th century).

The villain of Jordain is Fromont, son of Hardré, who also appears in the Geste des Loherains cycle. It has been argued that he and his relatives are based on historical figures associated with the city of Sens. A series of counts of Sens named Fromont (Frotmundus) and Rainard in the 10th and 11th centuries are portrayed very negatively in their relations with the church and Christianity by the chroniclers Flodoard of Reims, Rodulfus Glaber and Hugh of Fleury. An earlier connection with Sens is also apparent in the figure of Hardré, which is based on Ardradus, the chorbishop of Wenilo, archbishop of Sens in the mid-9th century. Wenilo, who betrayed King Charles the Bald in the 850s, is almost certainly the basis for the character of Ganelon, the villain of the Chanson de Roland, which stands at the head of the chanson de geste genre. The totality of the evidence suggests the workings of a school of jongleurs (minstrels) active at Sens whose own works were either never written down or else have been lost, but whose influence is detectable across several cycles of chansons de geste.

== Authorship and date ==
The author of Jordain is unnamed. He was probably a cleric. This is suggested by the strongly Christian tone of the work. All pagan elements from the Apollonius story are thoroughly Christianised. Marital fidelity is praised. The character of the archbishop of Palermo interprets all of Jordain's trials as acts of Divine Providence. The work also includes several prayers. It is possible that the work is the product of two authors.

The importance given to loyalty in Jordain suggests that it originated in and for a feudal aristocratic milieu. It survives in a single manuscript, now BnF fr. 860, at folios 111v–133v, with decorated initials and "beautifully executed" handwriting. It was probably written in the late 12th or early 13th century not long before the manuscript was copied in the first half of the 13th century.

== Versification and language ==
Jordain contains 4,245 lines in 165 laisses of varying length. Each line is ten syllables except for the last of each laisse, which has six. The epic caesura after the fourth syllable of each line is indicated by a dot in the manuscript. There are a few irregularities, such as lines of twelve syllables and an epic caesura falling after the sixth. The first 109 laisses exhibit assonance in the decasyllables, but the last 56 laisses are rhyming. This sudden shift may indicate a change in authorship.

The dialect of the poem is Francien with Picard characteristics. The noun case system is preserved (with some poetic licence). There is little use of imagery and emphasis is obtained by means of oaths. Much of the effect of the work would have been in its manner of recitation by the jongleur.

The literary merit of Jordain lies in its characters and not its poetry. Its most original section is the first, which contains a prison sequence that has no parallel in Apollonius of Tyre. Konrad Hofmann, who edited both texts, considered Jordain superior to Amis et Amiles.

== Setting ==
The town of Blaye, which is at the centre of Jordain, was the last town along the Via Turonensis, one of the French pilgrimage routes to the shrine of Saint James in Spain before entering the Duchy of Gascony. According to the Chanson de Roland, the hero Roland was buried in the basilica of Saint-Romain in Blaye.

The action in Jordain mostly takes place in the Mediterranean, but the poem displays only vague knowledge of the actual geography of the Mediterranean.

== Synopsis ==
Fromont, the nephew of Hardré, the villain who was killed by Ami in Amis et Amiles, wishes to avenge his uncle's death. He comes to Blaye and suborns a pair of serfs to kill the lord, Girart, son of Ami, and his wife, Hermenjart, in their sleep. He takes control of the town, but his position is not secure so long as Girart's infant son, Jordain, still lives in the care of his godparents, Renier and Eremborc, lord and lady of Valtamise. Fromont attempts to trick Girart into handing the boy over. Failing that, he bribes him with money, but Girart refuses and is thrown into a dungeon. His wife soon follows him. They remain imprisoned for thirteen months. Eremborc has her tongue cut out. Renier and Eremborc decide to substitute their own son for Jordain. Fromont decapitates the child himself, to the horror of his own nobles. Angels take the innocent's soul to heaven.

When he is old enough, Jordain, who is being passed off as Renier's son, is sent to Blaye for training as a knight. Fromont hates him because he looks like Girart. After he strikes Fromont, he is forced to perform menial tasks. When Fromont threatens his life, he returns to Valtamise, where Renier reveals to him the truth. Jordain, Renier, Eremborc and 400 of Renier's vassals head off to Blaye to enact vengeance on Fromont. Jordain cuts off his nose, but he escapes. During the battle that follows some time later, Charlemagne is passing by on the way of Saint James. His son, Lothair, impetuously joins the battle, attacks Renier and is killed by Jordain. Charlemagne must now side with Fromont and the men of Valtamise retreat. Having lost his own nose, Fromont has the noses of the two serfs cut off also.

An illustration of jousting from an early printed edition of the prose Jordain

Jordan, Renier and Eremborc take ship on the Gironde and head for the open ocean. They are attacked by Saracen pirates. While Jordain escapes, his godparents are captured and taken to Mount Bruiant, where they are sold as slaves to King Salatien. Floating on a piece of wood at sea, Jordain deliberately injures himself to draw blood so that the sea will be forced to disgorge him ashore, since the sea cannot stand blood. He is rescued by a fisherman, who directs him to the nearby city of Marcasille. There in the town square he accepts the challenge of King Mark to a joust. He catches the eye of the Princess Oriabel, who outfits him as one of her knights. He eventually reveals his true lineage to her.

Marcasille is attacked by a pagan army, whose champion Brumadant defeats five champions sent against him. With Oriabel's blessing, Jordain defeats him. The pagan army attacks, but King Mark's forces rout them. Jordain and Oriabel are married. After she becomes pregnant, Jordain decides to go in search of his godparents. She accompanies him and gives birth at sea, whereupon a storm threatens the ship and its company has her thrown overboard in a chest with money, fine cloth and a letter of explanation. Jordain continues to the Christian city of Orimonde, where he baptises his new daughter Gaudisce.

Oriabel drifts ashore near Palermo. The archbishop, out on a hunt, notices her and revives her lifeless body with a balm. She becomes an anchorite. Jordain, meanwhile, leaves the service of King Cemayre to search for her. He sails to Palermo and goes to a monastery to pray. Oriabel overhears him and the two are reunited. They move to continue the search for Renier and Eremborc. The archbishop bestows on them rich gifts and his blessing.

When Jordain inadvertently anchors in a port held by Saracen pirates, a sea battle ensues. He is captured, but his men rescue him. Renier, meanwhile, has obtained his freedom from Salatien. Neither recognises the other as they approach each other on the road. Only their respective battle cries, "Blaivies!" and "Valtamise!", avert a disaster. Jordain, Renier and Oriabel return to Orimonde to collect Gaudisce. King Cemayre's wife, however, has had her carted off to Constantinople and abandoned because she was more beautiful than her own daughter. In Orimonde, the queen tells to Jordain that his daughter is dead, but Gaudisce's former guardian, Josselme, admits the truth.

In Constantinople, Gaudisce is rescued by a nun. As she grows, the king's son, Aly, falls in love with her. She resists him. When Jordain arrives in the city, he learns of the prince's failed courting and goes to see the girl. He recognises his daughter and marries her to Aly. The whole party now goes through Italy to the court of Charlemagne at Orléans, where Renier intervenes to restore Jordain to the emperor's favour.

Finally, Jordain returns to Blaye and besieges it. Advised by his nephew Foucart to attack while the besiegers are weary from travel, Fromont launches a night sally and is captured. His demoralized men surrender and the inhabitants recognise their lawful lord. Fromont, Foucart and the two serfs are dragged to death. A messenger from Constantinople arrives with the news of the king's death. Aly and Gaudisce go to Constantinople to rule it. After some time, King Mark dies. Jordain gives Blaye to Renier and he and Oriabel go to rule Marcasille.

== Editions ==
- Hofmann, Konrad, ed. (1882) [1852]. Amis et Amiles und Jourdains de Blaivies, zwei altfranzösische Heldengedichte des kerlingischen Sagenkreises (2nd ed.). Erlangen: Andreas Deichert.
- Bishop, Walther Houghton (1962). A Critical Edition of Jordain de Blaivies with Introduction, Notes and Glossary (Ph. D. dissertation). University of North Carolina, Chapel Hill.
- Dembowski, Peter F., ed. (1991) [1969]. Jourdain de Blaye = Jourdains de Blavies, chanson de geste: Nouvelle édition entièrement revue et corrigée. Paris: Champion.

== Sources ==
- Ailes, Marianne (2001). "Review of Jourdain de Blaye en alexandrins". Medium Aevum. 70 (1): 150–151. ProQuest 194187625
- Brun, Laurent, ed. (2019). "Jourdain de Blaye". Archives de Littérature du Moyen Âge.
- Dembowski, Peter F. (2001). "Review of Jourdain de Blaye en alexandrins". Romance Philology. 54 (2): 408–412. doi:10.1484/J.RPH.2.304404. JSTOR 44742159.
- Geirnaert, Dirk (2011). "Museumstuk afgestoft: Antwerpse fragmenten van de Jourdein van Blaves". Tijdschrift voor Nederlandse Taal-en Letterkunde. 124 (2): 96–105.
- Green, Herman J. (1941). "Fromont, a Traitor in the Chansons de Geste". Modern Language Notes. 56 (5): 329–337. doi:10.2307/2911209. JSTOR 911209.
- Matsumura, Takeshi, ed. (1999). Jourdain de Blaye en alexandrins. Vol. 2 vols. Geneva: Droz.
