= Father Roquelaure =

Father Roquelaure is a French fairy tale collected by Achille Millien.

It is a type 516 tale in the Aarne-Thompson classification system. Others of this type are Trusty John and The Raven.

== Synopsis ==
A widowed queen urges her son, Emilien, to marry, but he does not. She dies. One day, he sees a portrait of the Princess Emilienne and falls in love. The portrait painter tells him that the princess is kept confined in a tower by a fairy. Emilien confides in a trusted servant, Jean, and after Jean makes secret preparations, they set out to find the princess. They take turns keeping watch at night.

While the prince sleeps, Jean hears voices talking. One is of Father Roquelaure, who tells how Prince Emilien's task of finding the princess will be hard. He will have to rub the wheels with moss to cross a river with no bridge, which will create a bridge; he will have to offer the fairy a distaff with diamonds and then give her a sleeping potion; when he takes the princess, his horses will refuse to go on, and he will have to refuse offers from coachmen with horses and carriages and instead dash them to pieces; when the princess becomes thirsty and vendors offer to sell her drinks, the drinks will be poison and he will have to dash them to the ground; they will come upon a drowning man, and the prince will have to push him back into the water rather than rescue him; finally, he will have to rub the wheels with moss again. And if he repeats any of the things he has just been told, Jean will turn to stone.

Throughout their journey, Jean tells Emilien to trust him and implements Father Roquelaure's words. His actions so frighten the princess that she tells Emilien that if he loved her, he would imprison Jean. After they return home and marry, Emilien demands that Jean explain his actions or be imprisoned. Jean finally explains and is turned to stone. The prince is deeply grieved. Within a year, the princess has a son, whom the prince wishes to name Jean in honor of his servant. A poor old woman comes to the christening feast, and so that no one will be unhappy there, he gives her a place and food to eat. She tells them that if they kill their baby, his blood will restore Jean. The prince kills the baby, and the blood brings Jean back to life. The old woman produces a magic wand and revives the baby. The princess realizes that she is the fairy who had kept her in the tower, and begs her pardon. The fairy tells her to be happy.

== See also ==
- In Love with a Statue
- How to find out a True Friend
- The Man of Stone
