= Theodor Schott =

German Protestant theologian and historian

Theodor Schott (16 December 1835 in Esslingen – 18 March 1899) was a German Protestant theologian, historian and librarian, known for his studies involving the history of French Protestantism.

From 1853 he studied theology and philosophy at Tübinger Stift in Tübingen, and after finishing his studies, spent two years as a curate at parishes in Württemberg. From 1859 he taught classes at Hofwyl near Bern, and later on, worked as a religious instructor at the gymnasium in Stuttgart. In 1867 he became a pastor of a parish in Berg, a suburb of Stuttgart. From 1873 up until his death, he served as a librarian at the royal public library in Stuttgart.

From 1876 onward, he was editor of the journal, Allgemeine Kirchenblatt für das evangelische Deutschland. He was the author of many biographies in the Allgemeine Deutsche Biographie, and also made contributions to the encyclopedia, Realenzyklopädie für protestantische Theologie und Kirche.

== Selected works ==
- Briefwechsel zwischen Christoph, Herzog von Württemberg, und Petrus Paulus Vergerius (edited with Eduard von Kausler, 1875) – Correspondence between Christoph, Duke of Württemberg and Peter Paul Vergerius.
- Columbus und seine Weltanschauung : Vortrag, gehalten im Kaufmännischen Verein Stuttgart, (1878) – Christopher Columbus and his Worldview.
- Elisabeth Charlotte (Lise-Lotte), Herzogin von Orleans : eine deutsche Prinzessin am französischen Hofe, 1881 – Elizabeth Charlotte, Duchess of Orléans: a German princess at the French court.
- Die Aufhebung des Ediktes von Nantes im Oktober 1685, (1885) – The Revocation of the Edict of Nantes in October 1685.
- Die Kirche der Wüste 1715 bis 1787 : Das Wiederaufleben des französischen Protestantismus im achtzehnten Jahrhundert, (1893) – The "church of the desert" from 1715 to 1787: The revival of French Protestantism in the eighteenth century.
- Württemberg und Gustav Adolf 1631 und 1632, (1895) – Württemberg and Gustav Adolf in 1631/32.
