= Erica Rhodes =

American actress and comedian (born 1983)

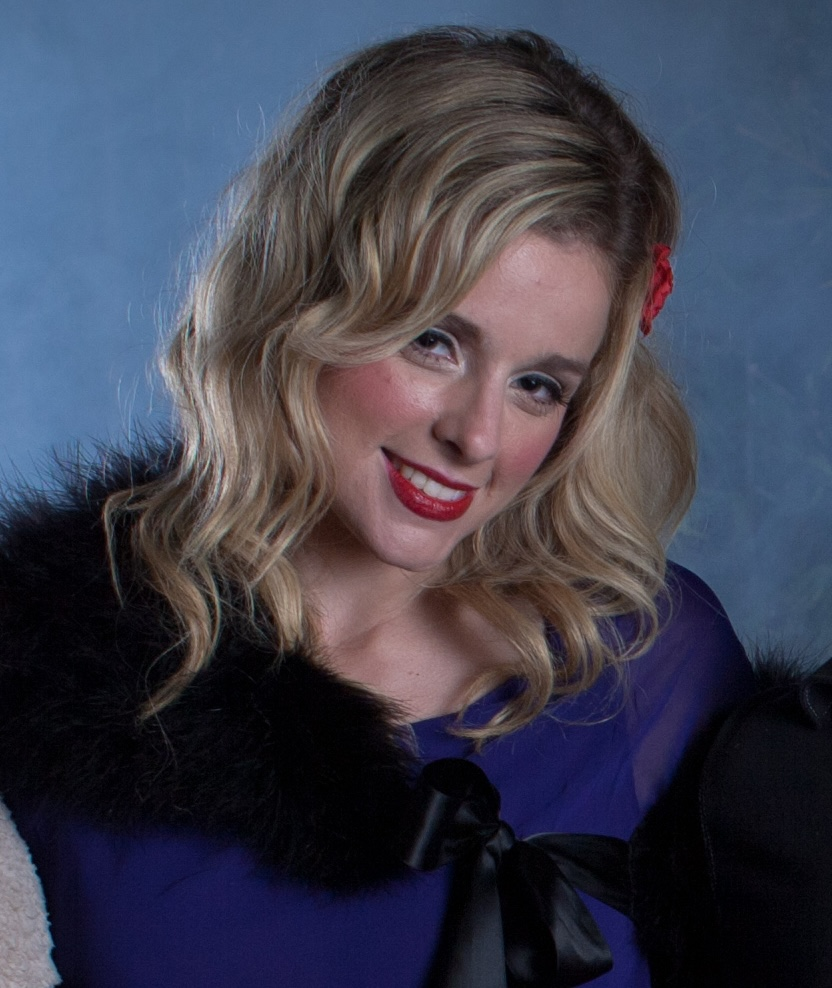
- Rhodes in 2012
- Born: April 5, 1983 (age 43); Newton, Massachusetts, U.S.
- Occupations: Actress; comedian
- Years active: 2004–present
- Website: ericarhodescomedy.com

Erica Rhodes (born April 5, 1983) is an American actress and comedian. She has been performing on A Prairie Home Companion since the age of 13 and appeared in several movies and TV shows, including Plague Town, 1000 Ways to Die, and The Consultants. She has also guest-starred on New Girl, @midnight with Chris Hardwick, and Modern Family. She competed in the reality television comedy competition series Bring the Funny.

== Early life ==
Rhodes was born and raised in Newton, Massachusetts, the daughter of Kristina Nilsson and Dean Rhodes. Her mother, a native of Minnesota, is a former violinist who performed with the Boston Pops. Her maternal uncle (by marriage) is writer and radio personality Garrison Keillor. Rhodes's father was a professional clarinetist before being diagnosed with multiple sclerosis, after which he began working as a Certified Public Accountant. Her paternal grandfather was Jewish, and changed his surname from Rosenblum to Rhodes.

She attended Boston University College of Fine Arts and graduated from the Atlantic Theater Conservatory. Prior to establishing her career in acting and comedy, Rhodes worked at a medical marijuana clinic in Los Angeles.

== Career ==
Rhodes has been a frequent guest on A Prairie Home Companion since her first appearance in 1996 where she initiated her recurring role as "The Conscience" of the host, Garrison Keillor. She appears on Keillor's 1997 Grammy-nominated album Garrison Keillor’s Comedy Theatre.

In 2008, Rhodes had a leading role in the independent horror film Plague Town.

Rhodes released her first comedy album, Sad Lemon, on June 29, 2019. The same year, she competed on the NBC comedy competition series Bring the Funny. In 2021, Rhodes released the comedy special La Vie en Rhodes, filmed outside the Rose Bowl in Pasadena, California, during the COVID-19 pandemic. The same year, she voiced the character of Dotty on the animated Netflix series A Tale Dark & Grimm.

She released her second comedy album, Ladybug, in 2023. In 2024, Rhodes competed on the series America's Got Talent.

== Podcast and radio appearances ==
Rhodes appeared on Ken Reid's TV Guidance Counselor podcast on September 28, 2016. She also made an appearance in episode 74 of Maddox's podcast, "The Best Debate In The Universe," which aired on November 6, 2017.

She has made several appearances on The Adam Carolla Show, beginning in 2019.

== Filmography ==
=== Film ===
Year	Title	Role	Notes
2004	Cavities	Smoking blonde	Short film
2008	The Crack Down	Girlfriend	
2006	Great Performance		
2008	Plague Town	Jessica Monohan	
2009	18 Year Old Virgin	Angela	
2009	The Watch	Lisa	Short film
2010	Go West	Julie	
2010	Blindsided	Waitress	Short film
2010	A Prairie Home Companion Live in HD! Again!	Daisy Buchanan	Television film
2011	Javatown	Shannon	
2011	Big Sky	Liz	
2011	Untitled MF 6: Bring the Rukus	Summer	
2011	The Memory Game	Julia	Short film
2011	The Theater Bizarre	Cellist	Segment: "Sweets"
2011	The Rainy Days of Timothy Grey	Sally Weathersby	Short film
2011	Killer Eye: Halloween Haunt	Jenna	
2012	Waiting for Dracula	Ophilia	
2012	Posey	Linda	Short film; also producer
2013	Long Live the Dead	Robin	Segment: "Dweezie"
2014	Play Nice	June Tiara	
2017	The Off Season	Laurie	
2018	The Dinner Party	Bridget	

=== Television ===
Year	Title	Role	Notes
2008	The World's Astonishing News	Patricia Stallings	
2004	FilmFakers	Robowoman	Episode: "The Mukashi Code"
2008	Downstairs Guys	Sandy	YouTube series
2008	Upstairs Girls	Sandy	YouTube series
2010	The Consultants	Erika Lipton	
2011	1000 Ways to Die	Goddess	Episode: "Apocalypse Harley"
2014	New Girl	Wendy	Episode: "Clavado En Un Bar"
2015	Suspense	Jane Kimball	Episode: "The Impulse"
2015	Why? with Hannibal Buress	Dead Woman	Episode: "Hannibal and Kate Plus 8"
2016	Modern Family	Marianne	Episode: "I Don't Know How She Does It"
2021	A Tale Dark & Grimm	Dotty	Netflix series; voice role
2024	America's Got Talent	Herself	Audition: July 2
2024	The Late Show with Stephen Colbert	Herself	Stand up set

=== Comedy specials ===
Year	Title	Notes
2021	La Vie en Rhodes	

== Discography ==
- 2019: Sad Lemon
- 2023: Ladybug
