= In Love with a Statue =

Italian fairy tale

In Love with a Statue is an Italian fairy tale collected by Thomas Frederick Crane in his 1885 book Italian Popular Tales.

== Synopsis ==
A king had two sons. The younger one fell in love with a statue. His older brother set out to see if he could find a woman like it. He bought a dancing mouse and a singing bird on the way, and saw a beautiful girl, exactly like the statue, appeared at a window when a beggar knocked on the door. He posed as a merchant of looking glasses and lured her onto his ship, and sailed off with her.

While he was sailing, a large black bird told him that the mouse, the bird, and the lady would all turn his brother's head but if he said anything, he would turn to stone. The older prince showed his brother the mouse and bird, but killed them; to keep him from killing the lady, the younger prince had him thrown into prison and, when he would not speak, condemned to death. When it was time to execute, the older brother told the story and turned to stone.

After the lady and the younger prince married, they had two children, and a physician said that with their blood, he could restore the prince to flesh. The mother refused, but the king had it done while she was at a ball. The older prince went to the ball, and the mother ran back to see what had happened to her children. The physician showed her them alive and well, and told her that he was her father, and wanted to show her what love of children was like.

== See also ==
- Trusty John
- How to find out a True Friend
- Amis et Amiles
- The Man of Stone
- Father Roquelaure
- The Raven
