= Plague Town =

- Directed by: David Gregory
- Written by: John Cregan; David Gregory
- Produced by: Daryl Tucker; Derek Curl
- Starring: Josslyn DeCrosta; Erica Rhodes; David Lombard
- Cinematography: Brian Rigney Hubbard
- Music by: Claudio Gizzi; Mark Raskin
- Distributed by: Dark Sky Films
- Release date: October 28, 2008 (Ravenna Nightmare Film Festival)
- Running time: 85 minutes
- Country: United States
- Language: English

Plague Town is a 2008 American horror film directed by David Gregory, co-written by Gregory and John Cregan, and starring Josslyn DeCrosta, Erica Rhodes, and David Lombard.

== Synopsis ==
While on holiday in the Irish countryside to discover their family roots, a dysfunctional family -consisting of a Dad, his new financee, his older daughter and her new boyfriend and a younger daughter - have their vacation plans upset when they miss the last bus of the day. They encounters a village where they are warned "They will find you".

That night they discovered the woods are full of deformed and homicidal residents, mostly mutant children, to whom death is all fun and games.

== Cast ==
- Josslyn DeCrosta as Molly Monohan
- Erica Rhodes as Jessica Monohan
- David Lombard as Jerry Monohan
- Lindsay Goranson as Annette Rothman
- James Warke as Robin
- Catherine McMorrow as Agnes Brawney
- Elizabeth Bove as Sheila
- Michael Donaldson as Chap

== Release ==
After debuting on March 28, 2009, at the HorrorHound Weekend film festival, the film was released on DVD on May 12, 2009. In Germany, the film was released on September 25, 2009.

== Reception ==
DVD Talk praised the movie for its tension building, haunting imagery and immersiver sound design. It stated that this was not a perfect film, but recommended it for fans of the horror genre.

== Background ==
The film is the first own directed film from Dark Sky Films and was the feature film debut for director David Gregory.
