= Rodulfus Tortarius =

French Benedictine monk

Rodulfus Tortarius (c. 1063 in Gien – c. 1122) was a French Benedictine monk of the Abbey of Fleury-sur-Loire, and a poet writing in Latin. A very early version of the story of Amys and Amylion occurs in his work.

He versified the Facta et dicta memorabilia of Valerius Maximus. His range was from comic tales to hagiography, with a Miracles of Saint Benedict.
