= Eduard von Kausler =

German archivist, historian and linguist

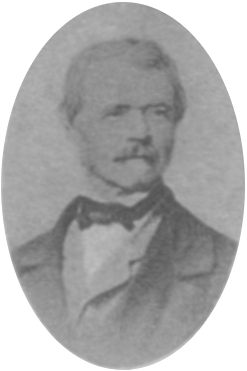
Eduard von Kausler

Eduard Heinrich von Kausler (20 August 1801, in Winnenden – 27 August 1873, in Stuttgart) was a German archivist, historian and linguist.

He studied jurisprudence as well as Germanic and Romance languages and history at the universities of Tübingen, Göttingen and Berlin. From 1826 onward, he was associated with the state archives in Stuttgart.

Among his better known published works is Wirtembergisches Urkundenbuch ("Württemberg register"), issued in three volumes from 1849 to 1871 (volume 1, the years ca. 700–1137; volume 2, the years 1138–1212; volume 3, the years 1213–1240). Other noteworthy writings by Kausler are:

- Les Livres des Assises et des Usages dou Reaume de Jérusalem (an edition of the assizes of Jerusalem, 1839).
- Geschichte der Kreuzzüge und des Königreichs Jerusalem, 1840 – History of the Crusades and the Kingdom of Jerusalem (from the Latin of William of Tyre, translation together with his brother Rudolf Kausler 1811–1874).
- Denkmäler altniederländischer Sprache und Litteratur (3 volumes, 1840–66) – Monuments of Old Dutch language and literature.
- Cancioneiro geral : altportugiesiche Liedersammlung des Edeln Garcia de Resende (new edition; 4 volumes, 1846–52) – General songbook; Old Portuguese collection of songs by the noble Garcia de Resende.
- Briefwechsel zwischen Christoph, Herzog von Württemberg, und Petrus Paulus Vergerius (with Theodor Schott, 1875) – Correspondence between Christoph, Duke of Württemberg and Peter Paul Vergerius.

His correspondence with philologist Konrad Hofmann was published as Briefe Konrad Hofmanns an Eduard von Kausler aus den Jahren 1848 bis 1873 ("Letters of Konrad Hofmann and Eduard von Kausler from the years 1848 to 1873"; introduction and remarks by Karl Vollmöller).
