= Amícus saga ok Amilíus =

Medieval Icelandic romance saga

Amícus saga ok Amílius is a medieval Icelandic romance saga. Probably from the fourteenth century, it was translated from Vincent de Beauvais's Speculum historiale, probably during the reign of Haakon V of Norway, and tells a similar story to the related French romance Amis et Amiles. The saga survives in only one manuscript, Stockholm, Royal Library Perg 4to nr 6 (ca 1400). The saga has enjoyed extensive critical discussion.

== Editions and translations ==
- Kolbing, Eugen, ed. "Bruchstuck einer Amicus ok Amilius saga", Germania, XIX (N.S. VII, 1874), 184–89.
