= Trusty John =

German fairy tale

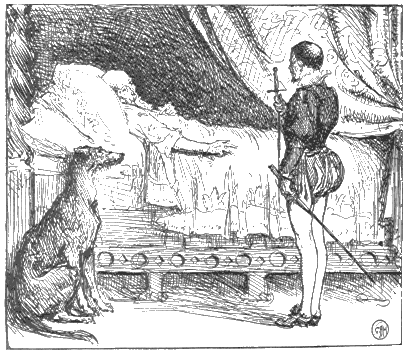
- The faithful servant stands beside his lord's bedside. An illustration of the story by H. J. Ford.

Folk tale
- Name: Trusty John
- Also known as: Faithful John, Faithful Johannes, John the True
- Aarne–Thompson grouping: ATU 516 (Faithful John)
- Region: Germany
- Published in: Kinder- und Hausmärchen, by the Brothers Grimm
- Related: In Love with a Statue, How to find out a True Friend, The Man of Stone, Amis et Amiles, Father Roquelaure, The Raven

"Trusty John", "Faithful John", "Faithful Johannes", or "John the True" (German: Der treue Johannes) is a German fairy tale collected by the Brothers Grimm and published in Grimm's Fairy Tales in 1819 (KHM 6). Andrew Lang included it in The Blue Fairy Book.

It is Aarne-Thompson type 516. Others of this type are Father Roquelaure and The Raven. Antti Aarne and Stith Thompson catalogued about 500 tales under this type, of which over 200 were Irish, and the remainder, from the rest of Europe and European colonies in America. Such tales include In Love with a Statue, How to find out a True Friend, The Man of Stone, and Amis et Amiles.

== Origin ==
The tale was published by the Brothers Grimm in the second edition of Kinder- und Hausmärchen in 1819. Their source was the German storyteller Dorothea Viehmann, from the village of Niederzwehren near Kassel.

== Synopsis ==
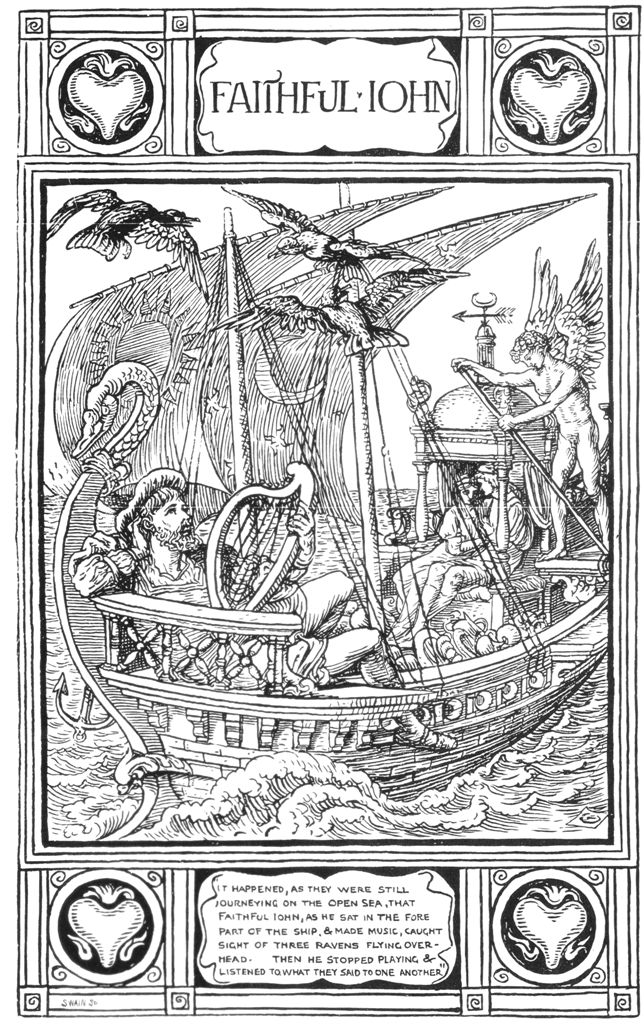
John overhears the birds' conversation about the grim fates that await the unsuspecting lovers. Illustration from Household stories from the collection of the Bros. Grimm (1914).

In some variants, a king on his deathbed orders his servant, Trusty John, not to let his son see a certain room, which holds a portrait of a princess.

In all variants, when the new king comes to power, he forces his way into the room. Instantly, he falls in love with the princess. In Joseph Jacobs's version, her country had been at war with his, and the portrait stems from betrothal negotiations that had fallen through; but in all versions, the king does not know how to win her. Trusty John tells him to prepare a ship with all manner of rich treasure, and then either sails with it himself, or has the king sail with him, to her country. The princess is lured aboard by the goods, and the ship sets sail, carrying her off.

While they travel, John hears three ravens. One says that as soon as they reach shore, a horse will come; if the king mounts it, it will fly into the air with him, and neither will be seen again. The solution is for someone to kill the horse, but anyone who reveals this by stating it out loud would have his legs turn to stone up to the knees. The second raven says (with variations in different tellings) that the king would be killed by wine at the wedding feast if it were not dashed to the ground, or that he would be incinerated by a wedding shirt if it was not destroyed by a glove-wearing person, etc.; in all variants, whoever says so would turn to stone to his waist. The third raven says, again in different variants, that the princess would faint and die unless someone draws three drops of blood from her right breast; or a dragon would attack their bridal chamber and unless driven off, kill them. True to form, whoever states this would turn entirely to stone.

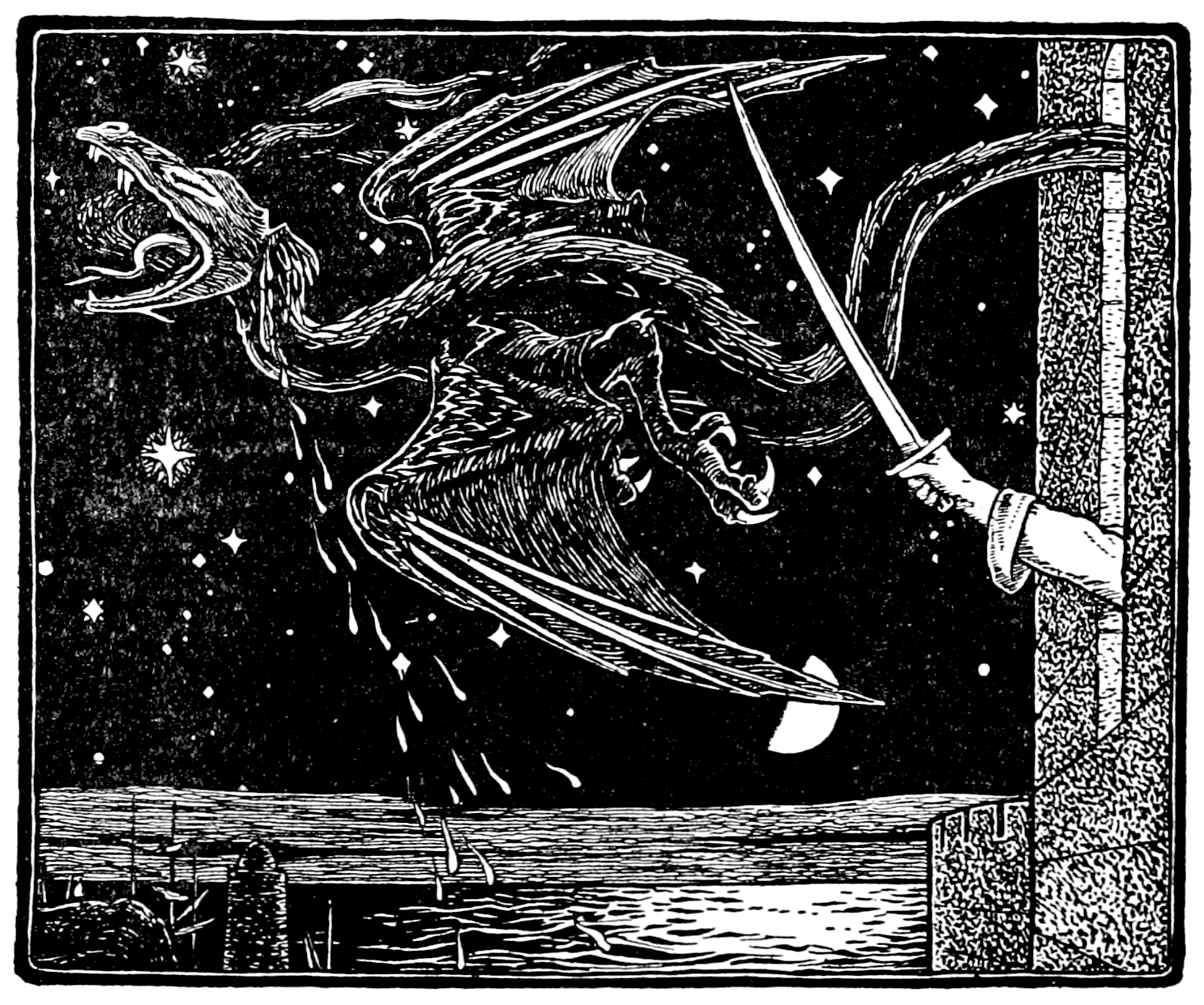
The servant expels the wounded dragon from the royal bedchamber. Illustration from Jacobs' version by John D. Batten

John prevents all three fates. For the first two, the king trusts that John has acted in his service; but for the third, the king decides to execute him. At the place of execution, John tells the story of the ravens and turns progressively to stone.

In time, the queen bears twin sons. The king learns that if he kills the boys and rub John's statue with their blood, he would come to life again. The king does this, and upon John's resurrection, he does the same to the boys and resurrects them. Later, John and the twins hide in a closet as the king explains what would need to be done to bring John back to test her loyalty. When the queen agrees to the sacrifice, John and the twins emerge from the door and embrace everyone. The king and queen live happily until their deaths.

== Analysis ==
=== Possible point of origin ===
British translator Edgar Taylor, in his original notes to the Grimm Brothers' tale, remarked that the story "contain[ed] so much of Orientalism", which would lead one to imagine oneself in The Arabian Nights' Entertainments.

Australian folklorist Joseph Jacobs pointed out, in his commentaries on his own reconstruction (John The True), in his work Europa's Fairy Book, that the story showed striking parallels with tales of Indian literary history and suggested them as a possible point of origin, due to the antiquity of the sources, such as Panchatantra and Somadeva's 11th century work The Ocean of Stories (or Kathasaritsagara).

Folklorist Stith Thompson seemed to concur with Jacobs's analysis and cited the works of Erich Rösch and Kaarle Krohn, who each have posited that, respectively, the material to form the tale came from India, or the tale, in complete form, travelled westward from India.

=== Motifs ===
According to scholar A. K. Ramanujan, the tale type shows a "motif cluster": the three perils that menace the couple and the faithful servant that overhears the birds' talk.

=== Variants ===
Graham Seal pointed out that Faithful John is a "figure of European and Asian folktales" who demonstrates the virtues of loyalty and trust. Indeed, variants of the tale have been collected from "all over Europe", as well as from India, Turkey, Middle East, South America and the West Indies.

In a German variant, the three speaking ravens are actually three witches in disguise that converse among themselves the plan to kill the royal couple.

=== Parallels ===
Croatian folklorist Maja Bošković-Stulli noted that the theme was explored as the subject matter of a Serbo-Croatian epic song: Pero Vitkovic offers to bring the Banica of Misir (the margravine of Egypt) as bride to Viennese Prince Karlo, despite his mother's objections. On the way there, Pero overhears a carrier pigeon describing the three perils Karlo and the margravine will have to face until their wedding, and notices that the carrier pigeon belongs to Karlo's mother, the Empress. Pero Vitkovic rescues the prince and the margravine from the perils and becomes stone, due to the bird's omens. She also reported versions of the song that contain the motif of the false merchant expedition as the protagonist's disguise to kidnap the foreign princess.

== Adaptations ==
=== Comics ===
Trusty John is a supporting character in the long-running comic book series Fables.

=== Animations ===
It is adapted in the 17th episode of Simsala Grimm. In this version, the young king is King Nicholas, the princess is Princess Aurelia, the king is King Gronald, and there are two ravens instead of three; among them are Gisela and Gertrude. This version has the court magician devise three curses: the cursed horse, the burning wedding shirt, and the poisoned goblet. It also reveals that after Faithful John is turned to stone while revealing the curse, King Nicholas will give the crown to the first person he met after the morning crock crows and that he will separate forever from Aurelia. With the help of Yoyo and Doc Croc, the princess confronts her father, who reveals his intentions, turning into stone himself and breaking the curse.

== See also ==
- The Enchanted Pig
- Long, Broad and Sharpsight
- How Ian Direach got the Blue Falcon

== Bibliography ==
- Baughman, Ernest Warren. Type and Motif-index of the Folktales of England and North America. Indiana University Folklore Series No. 20. The Hague, Netherlands: Mouton & Co 1966. p. 13.
- Bolte, Johannes; Polívka, Jiri. Anmerkungen zu den Kinder- u. hausmärchen der brüder Grimm. Erster Band (NR. 1-60). Germany, Leipzig: Dieterich'sche Verlagsbuchhandlung. 1913. pp. 42–57.
- Thompson, Stith. The Folktale. University of California Press. 1977. pp. 110–112. ISBN 0-520-03537-2
