= The Man of Stone =

Romanian fairy tale

Folk tale
- Name: The Man of Stone
- Mythology: Romanian
- Country: Romania

The Man of Stone (Omul de piatră) is a Romanian fairy tale collected by Petre Ispirescu in Legende sau basmele românilor.

== Synopsis ==
A king and queen had no children. A black man or Arab came to the king and offered a potion that would make the queen pregnant. The cook prepared it and, not knowing its powers, tasted some before coming to the queen. Both the cook and the queen became pregnant and each gave birth to a son.

When the prince was grown, the king had to go to war. He gave the keys to the castle and told him not to go into the door locked by the golden key. The prince went into it and found a spy glass that showed him the beautiful Princess Kiralina, and he fell so in love with her that he was sick and near dying. The king sent messengers but her father refused to let them marry. The prince decided to go ask her himself, and his foster brother, the cook's son, went with him.

They came to a hut where an old woman could not tell them; her son, the North Wind, might turn them to ice, so she sent them on to the Wild Wind. They could not stay there, either, but went on the house of the Spring Wind. The wind's mother, a tall and elegant woman, hid them because her son might kill them. When the wind came, his mother asked him how to reach Princess Kiralina, and the wind told her how it would take ten years; a fairy log, in a black forest by a river of pitch, could carry anyone there instantly, but whoever told that would turn to stone to his knees. Once there, the person had to make a golden stag and use it to smuggle himself into the princess's room, but whoever knew that would be turned to stone up to his waist. If that succeeded and the princess married, the Northwind's mother would spitefully send her a dress of cobwebs, and unless she washed in the tears of doves, she would be killed. The prince slept through it, but the cook's son heard it.

The cook's son told the prince to trust him and carried him to the princess by the log. The princess fell in love with him at sight and grew ill with longing. A hag told the king that a golden stag, put in her room, would cure her. The cook's son turned the log into a golden stag and hid the prince inside it. The cook's son agreed to hire it to the king, and the king brought it to the princess's room. At night the prince sneaked from the form and kissed the princess; the next night, she feigned sleep and caught him. When the cook's son came to take it back, the princess came alongside it, and the cook's son turned the stag into a chariot that carried them all off. The prince and princess married.

Later, when the princess was queen, she bought a gown of cobwebs. Secretly, the cook's son sprinkled her with the tears of doves, but was seen and accused of kissing the queen. The prince, now a king, ordered him beheaded. The cook's son explained what he had heard and was turned to stone. Later, the king and queen had a child and dreamed if they killed the child and put the blood on the statue, it would come to life. They did, and the statue did. The cook's son pricked his finger and put the blood on the dead child, who came back to life.

== Commentary ==
The opening account of the birth of the two children is a motif found in other tales, such as The Seven-headed Serpent, where a prince and a horse are similar linked by their births.

Most of the plot, however, is similar to such fairy tales as Trusty John, In Love with a Statue, and Father Roquelaure.
