= Wenilo (archbishop of Sens) =

9th-century Frankish cleric

Wenilo (Note: There are many variants of his name in French: Wenilon, Vénilon, Guenelon, Ganelon. Wanilo is a contemporary Latin variant.) (died 865) was the archbishop of Sens (Note: Sens had seven suffragans at the time.) from 836 or 837. Prior to becoming bishop, Wenilo was a palatine chaplain. As bishop, he was one of the leading men in Aquitaine and crowned Charles the Bald king in 848, definitively uniting Aquitaine with West Francia. In 858, he supported the East Frankish invasion and was denounced as a traitor by the king. They reconciled the next year, and Wenilo retained his office until his death. Nevertheless, he passed into legend as Ganelon, the archvillain of the Matter of France, his name a byword for "traitor".

== Bishop of Charles the Bald ==
Wenilo was a chaplain at the court of Charles the Bald before his appointment to the archbishopric. At his subsequent trial for treason, Charles reminded the assembled bishops how

a part of the realm was assigned me by my lord and father ... and in it the metropolitan see of Sens then lacked a pastor. For its good government, I commended it to Wenilo, who was at that time serving me as a clerk in my chapel.

When Charles's father, the Emperor Louis the Pious, died in 840, civil war broke out between Charles and his brothers, Lothair I and Louis the German. Wenilo supported Charles, allowing him to appoint his own choice of abbot at Fleury and at Ferrières. The new abbot of the latter, Lupus, had a personal correspondence with Wenilo. Wenilo was also the recipient of the Epistola tractoria ad Wenilonem by Prudentius of Troyes, whom he knew from the court of Louis the Pious in the 830s. (Note: The tract addressed to Wenilo concerns Prudentius's controversial opinions on double predestination and the case of Gottschalk of Orbais.)

In June 845, Wenilo and his suffragans, alongside the archbishops Hincmar of Reims and Rodulf of Bourges and their suffragans, attended a great assembly at Meaux to advise the "most devout prince" Charles. On 25 March 848, while celebrating Easter in Limoges, the magnates and prelates of the Kingdom of Aquitaine formally elected Charles the Bald as their king. He was consecrated there in May. Later, at Orléans, he was anointed and crowned by Wenilo of Sens. The initiative in this ceremony perhaps came from Hincmar of Reims, who had been consecrated by Wenilo, and who composed several liturgies for coronations and anointings.

It is recorded that Wenilo took an annual tribute of "one horse and a shield and lance" from the monastery of Saint-Rémy in Sens. The source for this is a letter of Aldric of Le Mans to the church of Sens, in which Aldric says that such an annual tribute was exacted from "the abbot of the same place". Aldric did not consider this oppressive.

== Treason, trial and reconciliation ==
In March 858, at Quierzy-sur-Oise, Charles met his nephew, Lothair II, to affirm their alliance. He also took oaths of fidelity from some of his major subjects. Wenilo, on account of illness, was unable to attend, but signed the oaths later. Shortly after that, (Note: The invasion began before the end of the siege of Oissel on 23 September.) Louis the German invaded Charles's kingdom and moved on Sens to "receive those Aquitainians, Neustrians and also Bretons who had pledged to come over to him". Wenilo was one of them: he brought Louis considerable military support, along with Count Odo of Troyes. Louis may have hoped to be anointed in Charles's place by the one who had anointed him, but Louis did not. In the end there was very little fighting, Charles rallied his supporters in Burgundy and Louis was forced to withdraw. At Jouy on 15 January 859, Charles declared victory. Charles personally denounced Wenilo as a traitor and threatened to depose him on 14 June 859. Wenilo reconciled with the king before the end of the year.

A published account of Charles's denunciation, A Proclamation against Wenilo, which appears to be heavily influenced by the ideology of Hincmar of Reims, has survived. It presents the election of 848 as a free election to a vacant office, and denies that anybody but the bishops who took part in Charles's anointing can stand in judgement over him. The chief complaint against Wenilo was that he had given his "solace" (solatium) (Note: The term solatium was a euphemism in use at least since the reign of Childebert II. It referred to the aid that was owed the sovereign in the form of military service, the so-called militia ecclesiae (church militia) raised on church lands.) to Louis rather than to the one to whom it was owed. Charles specifically credits the other bishops (and implicitly their "solaces") with helping him recover his position after Wenilo's treachery. He also accused Wenilo of having "celebrated public masses for my brother ... in my palace of Attigny." This was not an accusation of treason (infidelitas), but of a breach of canon law. Wenilo had performed mass in another diocese with the local bishop's permission, and he had consorted with excommunicates without the consent of his fellow bishops.

== Ganelon of the chansons de geste ==
Scholars agree that Wenilo is the historical basis for the character of the traitor Ganelon (Guenelon) in the late 11th-century Chanson de Roland. The earliest use of the name "Ganelon" as a synonym for "traitor" dates from the mid-13th century. Wenilo's chorbishop (auxiliary bishop) from 847 to 849, Audradus Modicus, also morphed into the villain Hardré or Adradus.

Preceded by Aldric	Archbishop of Sens; 836/837 – 865	Succeeded by Egil
