= Amis et Amiles =

Medieval French epic poem

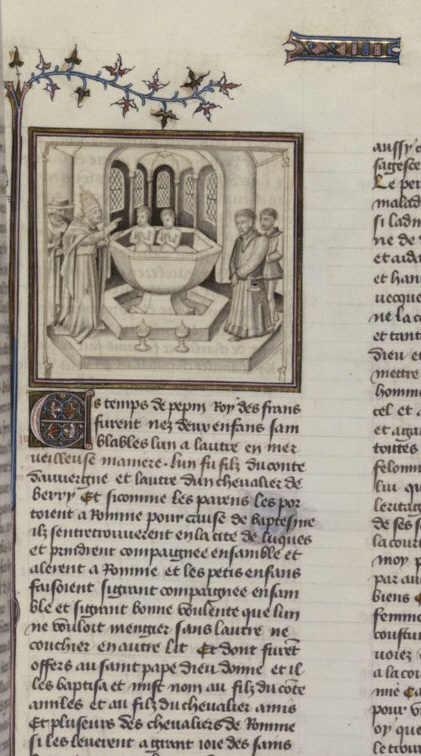
A 15th century manuscript of Amis et Amiles.

Amis et Amiles is an old French romance based on a widespread legend of friendship and sacrifice. In its earlier and simpler form it is the story of two friends, one of whom, Amis, was sick with leprosy because he had committed perjury to save his friend. A vision informed him that he could only be cured by bathing in the blood of Amiles's children. When Amiles learnt this he killed the children, who were, however, miraculously restored to life after the cure of Amis.

The tale found its way into French literature through the medium of Latin, as the names Amicus and Amelius indicate, and was eventually attached to the Carolingian cycle in the 12th-century chanson de geste of Amis et Amiles. This poem is written in decasyllabic assonanced verse, each stanza being terminated by a short line. It belongs to the heroic period of French epic, containing some passages of great beauty, and maintains a high level of poetry throughout.

The oldest version is a Latin poem composed around 1090 by Radulphus Tortarius, a monk of Fleury. The opening lines suggests that the poet was retelling a popular tale: Historiam Gallus, breviter quam replico, novit... (The Gaul knows the tale, which I am briefly telling...). More distant origins are rooted in folklore.

== Plot ==
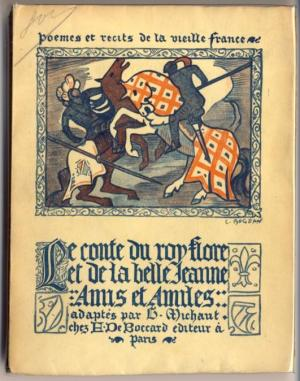
A French edition of Amis et Amiles.

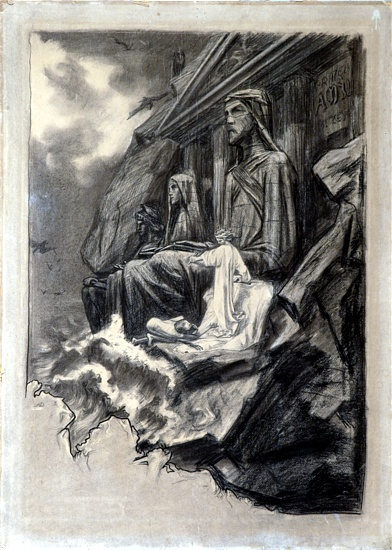
Illustration by František Bílek.

Amis has married Lubias and become count of Blaives (Blaye), while Amiles has become seneschal at the court of Charlemagne, and is seduced by the emperor's daughter, Bellisant. The lovers are betrayed, and Amiles is unable to find the necessary supporters to enable him to clear himself by the ordeal of single combat, and fears, moreover, to fight in a false cause. He is granted a reprieve, and goes in search of Amis, who engages to personate him in the combat. He thus saves his friend, but in so doing perjures himself. Then follows the leprosy of Amis, and, after a lapse of years, his discovery of Amiles and cure.

There are obvious reminiscences in this story of Damon and Pythias, and of the classical instances of sacrifice at the divine command. The legend of Amis and Amiles occurs in many forms with slight variations, the names and positions of the friends being sometimes reversed. The crown of martyrdom was not lacking, for Amis and Amiles were slain by Ogier the Dane at Novara on their way home from a pilgrimage to the Holy Land.

Jourdain de Blaives, a chanson de geste which partly reproduces the story of Apollonius of Tyre, was attached to the geste of Amis by making Jourdain his grandson.

== Versions ==
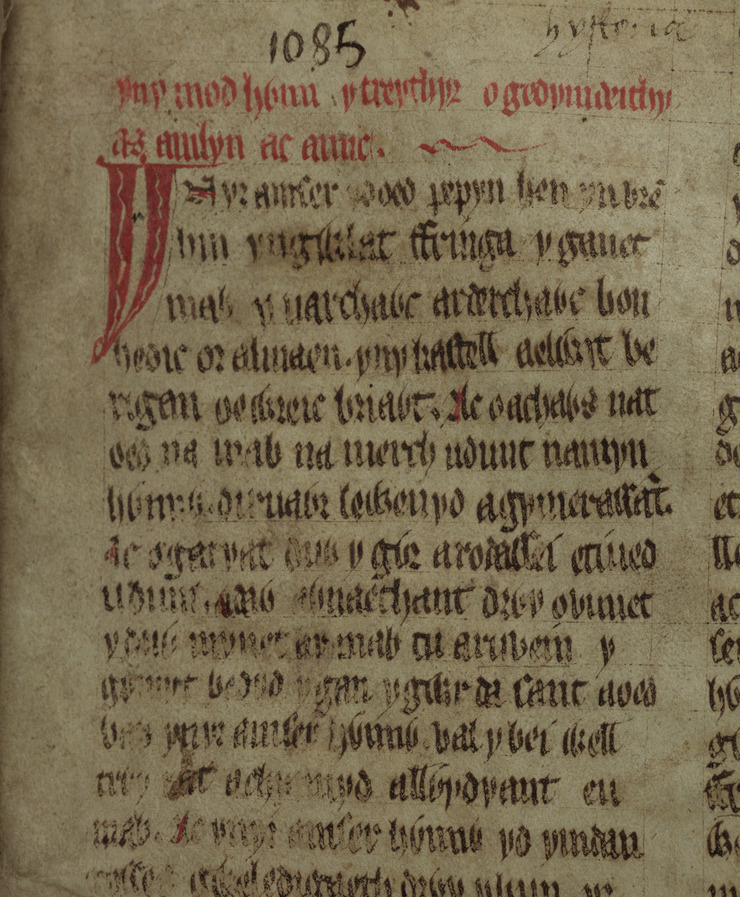
The opening lines of the early 14c Welsh language Amlyn ac Amig manuscript from the Red Book of Hergest (Jesus College, Oxford; MS 111

The versions of Amis and Amiles include:

- Numerous Latin recensions in prose and verse, notably that given by Vincent de Beauvais in his Speculum historiale (lib. xxiii. cap. 162-166 and 169) and the supposed earliest by Rodulfus Tortarius
- An Anglo-Norman version in short rhymed couplets, which is not attached to the Charlemagne legend and agrees fairly closely with the English Amis and Amiloun (Midland dialect, 13th century); these with the old Norse version are printed by Eugen Kölbing, Altengl. Bibl. vol. ii. (1889), and the English romance also in H. Weber, Metrical Romances, vol. ii. (1810); it also appears in the Auchinleck manuscript
- The 12th-century French chanson de geste analysed by P. Paris in Hist. litt. de la France (vol. xxii.), and edited by K. Hofmann (Erlangen, 1882) with the addition of Jourdain de Blaives
- The Middle Welsh Cydymdeithas Amlyn ac Amig, composed perhaps in the early fourteenth century
- The probably fourteenth-century Old Norse Amícus saga ok Amilíus, translated from Vincent de Beauvais's Speculum historiale, probably during the reign of Haakon V of Norway
- The Latin Vita sanctorum Amici et Amelii (pr. by Kolbing, op. cit.) and its Old French translation, Li amitiez de Ami et Amile, L. Molaud and C. d'Henault in Nouvelles du xiiie siecle (Paris, 1856)
- Walter Pater's retelling of the story in the first chapter of his The Renaissance: Studies in Art and Poetry (1888), 'Two Early French Stories.'
- The Middle High German poem Engelhard is partly based on the plot of Amis et Amiles.

== Motifs ==
The basic plot of the story is found in many fairy tales including In Love with a Statue, Trusty John, and How to find out a True Friend.

== Editions and translations ==
- Foster, Edward E. (ed.), 'Amys and Amiloun', in Amis and Amiloun, Robert of Cisyle, and Sir Amadace, 2nd edn (Kalamazoo, Michigan: Medieval Institute Publications, 2007), ; .
- Fukui, Hideka (ed.). Amys e Amillyoun. Anglo-Norman Text Society. Plain Texts Series 7. London, 1990. Based on BL MS Royal 12 C.
- The Birth of Romance: An Anthology. Four Twelfth-century Anglo-Norman Romances, trans. by Judith Weiss and Malcolm Andrew (London: Dent, 1992), ISBN 0460870483; repr. as The Birth of Romance in England: Four Twelfth-Century Romances in the French of England, trans. by Judith Weiss, Medieval and Renaissance Texts and Studies, 344/The French of England Translation Series, 4 (Tempe, Ariz.: Arizona Center for Medieval and Renaissance Studies, 2009), ISBN 9780866983921.
