= Joufroi de Poitiers =

13th-century French romance

Joufroi de Poitiers or Joufrois is a 13th-century French romance in 4613 octosyllabic verses. Only one manuscript of this work is preserved, in the Royal Library, Copenhagen, and this gives the romance in an incomplete form.

== Synopsis ==
The romance tells the adventures of Joufroi, son of Richier, count of Poitiers, and of his wife Aliénor. Joufroi receives his chivalric training in England, where he is knighted at court; he fights a successful duel to defend the honour of quenn Halis (Alice) whom a seneschal has accused of adultery. Joufroi, who has become count of Poitiers at the death of his father, returns to Poitou and experiences various adventures; in order to seduce and free Agnès de Tonnerre whom her jealous husband had locked up, he pretends to be "Lord of Cocagne" and establishes a sumptuous encampment under a pear tree, then he disguises himself as a monk to introduce himself to her. A messenger brings him a box full of jewels from an unknown lady; Joufroi distributes everything and keeps only one ring for himself. With his companion Robert, he returns incognito to England to aid King Henry against the King of Ireland and Scotland. Finding himself short of money as a result of his great liberality, he marries Blanchefleur, the daughter of his host, a wealthy bourgeois from London, and spends the young woman's dowry, to the great sorrow of his in-laws. The troubadour Marchabrun then comes to court, reveals Joufroi's identity and summons him to return to Poitou where the count of Toulouse, Anfos de Saint-Giles, has taken advantage of his absence to ravage the country. Joufroi breaks off his marriage to Blanchefleur and, with the support of the king of England, makes her marry an English earl. He goes to visit the queen and finds out that she is the stranger who sent him the jewels. Halis confesses her love for him and promises to meet him that same evening; their night of love begins with a misunderstanding, the queen finding herself in Robert's bed (the latter eventually points out her mistake); Halis and Joufroi stay together for three days. Back in Poitiers Joufroi is besieged by the count of Toulouse, but defeats him thanks to Robert. The end is missing in the manuscript: the romance stops when Joufroi is about to marry the count's daughter.

== An unclassifiable romance ==
Joufroi de Poitiers appears to be inspired by the life of William VII, count of Poitou and troubadour, both in its geographical setting and in its language which has Franco-Provençal, even Franco-Italian features. Likewise the troubadour Marchabrun in the romance is a reference to the troubadour Marcabru who lived in the 12th century. This chivalric romance does not contain any marvels or mysteries; it is characterized by a humour close to the genre of the fabliau; the protagonist is a licentious, amoral hero (as in the episode of Blanchefleur), always ready to disguise himself and to play tricks. The narrator intervenes several times in the story to ask the listeners for their opinion or to give his own; for example in the love episode between Joufroi and the queen, where "the narrator openly admits that he, in Robert's place, would not have hesitated to sleep with the queen, who had slipped into his bed by mistake".

This romance belongs to the realist vein of the 13th century and has been compared to the works of Jean Renart.

== Editions ==
- Fay, Percival B.; Grigsby, John L., eds. (1972). Joufroi de Poitiers: roman d'aventures du XIII^{e} siècle. Textes littéraires français, 183. Genève: Droz.
- Régnier-Bohler, Danielle, ed. (2000). Récits d'amour et de chevalerie: XII^{e}-XV^{e} siècle. Paris: R. Laffont. ISBN 2221072081.
- Manetti, Roberta, ed. (2019). Joufroi de Poitiers: romanzo francese del XIII secolo. Alessandria: Edizioni dell'Orso. ISBN 978-8862748971.

== Translation into Modern French ==
- Joufroi de Poitiers: traduction critique. Translated by Noël, Roger. New York: P. Lang. 1987. ISBN 0820403768.
