= Little Annie the Goose-Girl =

Norwegian fairy tale

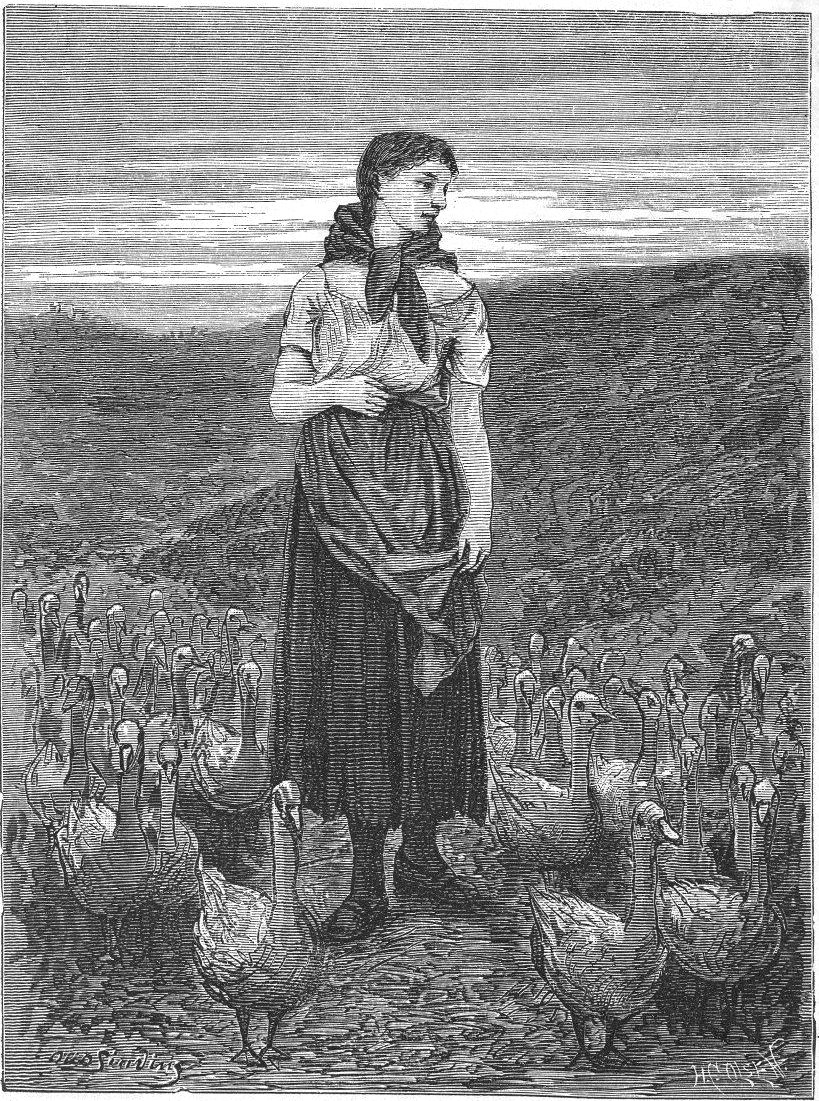
Illustration of Lucy from "Vesle Aase Gaasepige" from 1879.

Vesle Åse Gåsepike (Little Annie the Goose-Girl) is a Norwegian fairy tale collected by Peter Christen Asbjørnsen and Jørgen Moe in Norske Folkeeventyr. It has also been translated as Little Lucy Goosey Girl, and classified as Aarne-Thompson tale type 870A, "The Goose-Girl (Neighbor's Daughter) as Suitor".

== Synopsis ==
Little Aase (she is "Annie" or "Lucy" in English versions) worked for the king as a goose-girl. One day, she sat on the road to see the king's son. He warned her not to look to have him, and she declared that if she was to have him, she would.

The Prince looked over all the pictures of princesses sent him, and chose one. He had a stone that knew everything and would answer questions, so Aase warned the princess that if there were anything about her that she didn't want the prince to know, she had best not step on the stone that lay beside the bed. The princess asked that Aase get into the bed, and then, when the prince was asleep, Aase would get out and the princess would get in. When Aase got in, the prince asked who stepped into his bed, and was told a maid, but when the princess and Aase had traded places, the princess got out in the morning, the prince asked who stepped out, and the stone said someone who has borne three babies.

He sent her away, and sent for another princess. From his warning to Aase not to think to have him, to the princess's stepping out of bed, it went as with the first, except that this princess had borne six. He sent her away, and sent for a third. But this time, when Aase was still in bed with him, he put a ring on her finger, too tight for her to get off again. When the third princess proved to have borne nine babies, he asked the stone the trick, and it told him how the princesses had all put Aase in their place. The prince went to find Aase. She had a rag tied about her finger, and although she claimed to have cut herself, he pulled it off and found the ring.

So they wed, and Aase had the king's son after all.

== Literary analogues ==
The tale is grouped under Aarne-Thompson tale type 870A "The Little Goose-Girl". It is similar to Maid Maleen (type 870), in which the heroine also substitutes for a false bride who stands in no relationship to her, and takes her place.

A Gil Brenton, Child ballad 5, and its Scandavian variants, uses the same elements as this fairy tale to rather different effect. The hero, on learning that the pregnant bride has substituted a servant who is a maiden, then learns through her story or various tokens he gave her that he is the father of her child.

The substitution of a maiden for the non-virgin bride is found earlier in many forms of the legend of Tristan and Iseult; Iseult, having lost her virginity to Tristan on the journey, substitutes her maid Brangwin.

== Commentary ==
When George Webbe Dasent made his translation of these tales, in his preface he forbade children to read the last two stories, of which this was one. J. R. R. Tolkien cited this in his essay "On Fairy-Stories"; although he approved of Dasent's refusal to let prudery dictate his translation, Tolkien thought the command sprang from the belief that fairy tales were naturally children's literature.

== See also ==
- Cap O' Rushes
- The Goose Girl
