= Popular Tales from the Norse =

1859 translation of Norse folktales

- Author: Peter Christen Asbjørnsen and Jørgen Moe
- Translator: George Webbe Dasent
- Language: English
- Genre: Folklore, Fairy tale
- Publisher: Edmonston and Douglas
- Publication date: 1859
- Publication place: United Kingdom
- Media type: Print

Popular Tales from the Norse is an 1859 collection of Norwegian folktales translated into English by George Webbe Dasent. It is the first major English translation of the Norske Folkeeventyr collected by Peter Christen Asbjørnsen and Jørgen Moe.

== Content ==
The first edition (1859) contains translations of 58 tales from the original Norwegian collections. It includes stories that have since become staples of English storytelling, such as Three Billy Goats Gruff, East of the Sun and West of the Moon, Why the Sea is Salt, and various tales featuring the stock character "Boots" (Askeladden).

The book is also noted for Dasent's lengthy "Introductory Essay on the Origin and Diffusion of Popular Tales," in which he argues for the Indo-European origin of myths and folktales, influenced by the theories of Jacob Grimm.
