= The Charcoal Burner =

Norwegian fairy tale

Folk tale
- Name: The Charcoal Burner
- Also known as: Kullbrenneren
- Aarne–Thompson grouping: 1641
- Country: Norway
- Published in: Norwegian Folktales

The Charcoal Burner is a Norwegian fairy tale, collected by Peter Christen Asbjørnsen and Jørgen Moe.

Published in the book Norwegian Folk Tales 1 (1990) ISBN 82-09-10598-1

It is similar to the Brothers Grimm tale Doctor Know-all , and is classified as Aarne–Thompson Type 1641, "Being in the right place at the right time". Another tale of this type is Almondseed and Almondella.

== Plot summary ==
A charcoal burner becomes a parson by means of various tricks.

Unintentionally he detects some thieves in the king's castle, gains a prophetic reputation in the church, passes a test set by the king, and predicts the queen's having twins.

== See also ==
- Class satire
