= "Good day, fellow!" "Axe handle!" =

Scandinavian folktale and non-sequitur

"Good Day, Fellow!" "Axe Handle!"
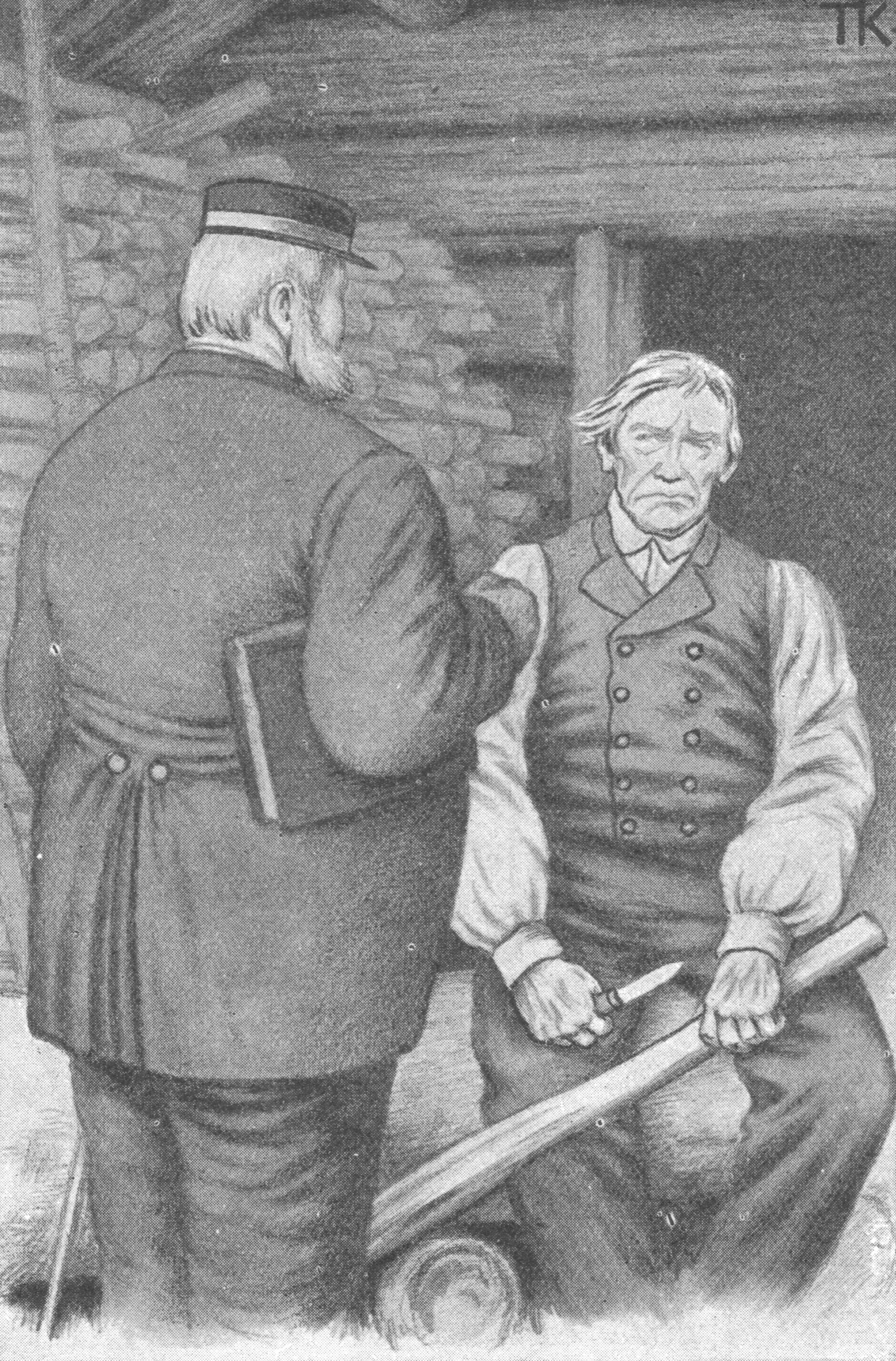
- Illustration by Theodor Kittelsen

Folk tale
- Name: "Good Day, Fellow!" "Axe Handle!"
- Also known as: "God dag, mann!" "Økseskaft!"
- Aarne–Thompson grouping: 1698J
- Country: Norway
- Origin Date: 1770s
- Published in: Norwegian Folktales

"'Good Day, Fellow!' 'Axe Handle!'" (Norwegian: "God dag, mann!" "Økseskaft!") is a Scandinavian folktale, collected by Asbjørnsen and Moe.

== Plot ==
A deaf or hard-of-hearing ferryman has a wife, two sons and a daughter. They fritter away all their money, and leave him to pay the bill when their credit runs out.

He sees the bailiff coming in the distance and decides to be clever and prepare his answers ahead of time. He reasons that the first thing the man will ask will be about what he is carving. He will say that it is an axe handle. He thinks that the other questions will be about the length of the axe handle, his ferry, his mare and the way to the cowshed.

However, the first thing the bailiff says is "Good day, fellow!" He replies "Axe handle!", thinking himself clever.

Next the bailiff asks how far it is to the inn. "Up to this knot!" he replies, pointing to the axe handle.

The bailiff shakes his head and stares at him.

"Where is your wife, man?" he says.

"I'm going to tar her," says the ferryman. "She's lying on the beach, cracked at both ends."

"Where is your daughter?"

"Oh, she's in the stable, big with foal," he says, still thinking himself clever.

The bailiff finally gets angry with him and shouts, "Go to the devil, fool that you are!"

"Oh, it's not far away, when you're over the hill, you're almost there," says the man.

== Influence ==
The phrase "Goddag mann, økseskaft!" (Good day, fellow axe handle) has become a common idiom for a non sequitur, not just in Norway but also the rest of Scandinavia ("Goddag, yxskaft!" in Swedish, "Goddag mand, økseskaft!" in Danish and "Hyvää päivää, kirvesvartta!" in Finnish).

The folktale was later published in the widely used Swedish elementary school book Sörgården by Anna Maria Roos in 1912.

A similar tale appears in a 1985 collection of folktales given an erotic twist, by Erik Høvring.
