= Norsk Folkeminnelag =

Norsk folkeminnelag (NFL) [= Norwegian Folklore Society] founded in 1920, is a voluntary, non-profit cultural organization communicating and disseminating traditional folk poetry and customs. Society protects collected materials through book releases, guides collectors, and own research in the field of folklore. From 1922 to 2012, the company has published 166 book titles, as well as a reprint of Magnus Brostrup Landstads Norske Folkeviser (= Norwegian Folk Songs) from 1852, besides cassettes and CDs with original recorded Folk Songs.

The main activities are the publication of the book series Norsk Folkeminnelags skrifter [= writings]. In addition, the Norwegian Folklore Society publishes a journal called FOLKEMINNER. NFL-Nytt [= News], with scientific papers and articles on various folkloric topics, as well as book reviews. The journal also contains communication from board meetings, seminars, etc.

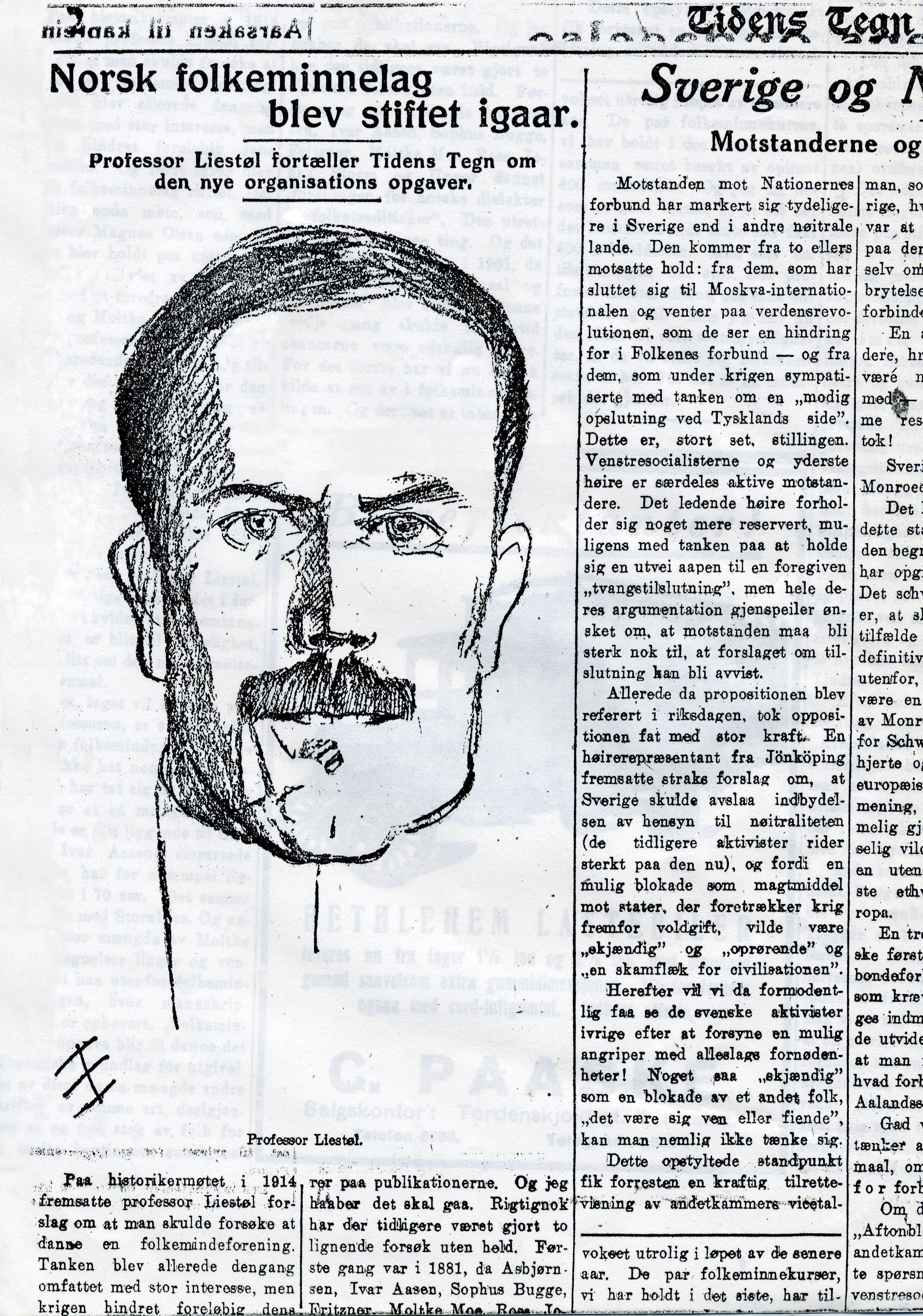
The newspaper Tidens Tegn's presentation of the newly established Folk Society in, 1920, with a drawing of its founder, professor Knut Liestøl.

== Decentralization of oral sources ==
From the beginning, the Folklore Society has committed itself to publishing to a wide audience. Since the 1830s oral stories have been collected among Norwegian peasants, sailors, and students. The most important of these sources (collected by Peter Christen Asbjørnsen and Jørgen Moe, Sophus Bugge, Moltke Moe, etc.), led to the creation of Norsk Folkeminnesamling (NFS). By 1914, these materials had become entered the public domain. Nevertheless, archives were essentially inaccessible to ordinary people. The same applied to other collections (i.e. Johan Theodor Storaker etc.), which were taken care of at the Manuscript Collection in the University Library of Oslo (now the National Library of Norway, Oslo).

NFL in particular emphasized folklore genres, beliefs, and customs that were linearly passed on from one generation to the next. While the early editions were systematically parent material collections the books in recent years have been more focused on historical context and commentary, with book decor, illustrations, hardback, and bindings. Earlier the Norwegian Folklore Society was most focused on making available the already collected material at NFS. This was done to refute allegations that the reconstruction of such a central archive would only cause the material exclusively reserved for a small circle of scholars. It was an explicit national program to make sure the oral sources in published form should be returned to the areas where they were originally collected. At the same time, the releases were meant to be a tribute to the collectors, and a way to encourage them to continue their efforts to save important oral culture that surrounded them in everyday life.

== The purpose of the Folklore Society's business ==
However, the NFL highlights not only what stands in danger of being buried and forgotten but is also involved in the ongoing collection and mapping of contemporary folk culture. Through folkloristic releases from virtually every corner of Norway, the Folklore Society has succeeded in preserving and visualizing a great part of the country's intangible cultural heritage, which could otherwise be lost to time. Perspectives have also shifted towards identifying new cultural elements, cultural encounters (acculturation), and different forms of expression.

As the oral tales are being transferred to other media, some may argue that the material is not being done justice until the material once again comes to be used in its traditional environment. However, the releases are not primarily intended to revitalize, but rather to document different traditions. Furthermore, in some cases, tapes and CD releases are attached to books with musical content. Through releases, the Folklore Society conducts an active cultural policy by making the readers aware of aspects of the intangible material culture that most people might not otherwise have gained awareness of. There are also many examples of local communities, professional musicians, and storytellers that have been able to acquire and revitalize parts of their historical local culture after the documented sources from the Folklore Society.

== The Folklore Society's current and future work ==
NFL volatile workspaces - the intangible immaterial culture - have put their main focus on book publications. This has been and is still the backbone of the activities, but the NFL also operates other types of cultural dissemination. The Society is actively participating in projects through the guidance of those who are willing to collect folk traditions, and also consultation authors with scripts. NFL has on several occasions been involved in exhibitions and cultural arrangements, and cooperates extensively with other cultural organizations, and does lectures, seminars on their own. NFL is also a member of the Norwegian Cultural Heritage Association.

== NFL's chairmen ==
- Magnus Olsen, 1920-?
- ?
- Kjell Bondevik, 1968-1972
- Brynjulf Alver, 1972-1976
- Velle Espeland, 1876-1982
- Anne Moestue, 1982-1988
- Erik Henning Edvardsen, 1988-1994
- Finn Christen Hansen, 1994-1999
- Synnøve Riise Bøgeberg, 1999-2003
- Sidsel Kvarteig, 2003-2005
- Trude Luice Nedregård Isaksen, 2005-2009
- Liv Bjørnhaug Johansen, 2009-2010
- Ida Tolgensbakk, 2010-2011
- Tove Solbakken, 2011-

As famous members of the board one can also mention, Jørgen Løvland, Halvdan Koht, Knut Liestøl, Reidar Th. Christiansen, Olav Bø and Reimund Kvideland.

== Bibliography ==
- Svale Solheim: Etter 50 år: Norsk folkeminnelag og tradisjon i Tradisjon, Tidsskrift for Folkeminnevitskap Nr. 1, 1971, p. 83 – 84.
- Jorun Hermansen (red): Norsk folkeminnelag 90 år 1920-2010--, Norsk folkeminnelag. Oslo 2010.
