= Why the Bear Is Stumpy-Tailed =

Norwegian fairy tale

Why the Bear Is Stumpy-Tailed (Norwegian: Hvorfor bjørnen er stubbrumpet) is a Norwegian fairy tale collected by Peter Christen Asbjørnsen and Jørgen Moe in Norske Folkeeventyr.

It is Aarne–Thompson type 2, The Tail-Fisher.

== Synopsis ==
A bear sees a fox with some fish which he has stolen and asks the fox how he got them. The fox tells him that he used his tail to catch the fish and tells him that he cut a hole through the ice, put his tail into the water and waited. The fox also tells the bear not to worry if his tail stings as that is the fish biting, and to pull his tail out with a strong sideways cross-pull when he has finished fishing.

The bear does as the fox told him and keeps his tail down for such a long time that it gets frozen, so that when the bear pulls it out it snaps off leaving the stumpy tail that all bears have.

== Variants ==
This tale is widespread, and includes other possible victims, including wolves and rabbits.

== Adaptions ==
=== Web animation ===
- the YouTube channel Pudding Tv Fairy tales told the story.
