= The Contrary-Minded Woman =

Norwegian folk story

- Author: P. Chr. Asbjørnsen and Jørgen Moe
- Translator: Hans Lien Braekstad
- Illustrator: Erik Theodor Werenskiold, Theodor Kittelsen, Otto Ludvig Sinding, and C. Hjorthøy
- Language: English
- Publisher: David Nutt
- Publication date: 1897
- ISBN: 9781112348877

"The Contrary-Minded Woman" (Norwegian: Kjerringa mot strømmen) is a Norwegian folktale originally collected by authors Peter Christen Asbjørnsen and Jørgen Moe in their book Norwegian Folktales. This story tells the tale of a Contrary Wife and a Husband arguing over how grain is to be cut causing a fight and the eventual drowning of the wife. However, in death, the wife still being contrary floats upstream ending the tale. This story is part of a continuation of P. Chr. Asbjørnsen's and Jørgen Moe's original compendium of fairy tales Norske Folkeeventyr. In the original collection, the story's name is Kjerringa mot strømmen. It has since been translated multiple times with multiple names such as Goody Gainst-the-stream by Dasent, The Old Woman Against the Stream by Iverson, and The Contrary-Minded Woman by Braekstad. Braekstad's and Dasent's translations came in 1859 and 1897 respectively, altering words and occasionally removing stories to appeal to the wider audience the English translation could reach. Iverson's translation came recently and has helped remove some challenging language barriers from the 1800s for the newer generation of the 2000s.

The original collection of Norwegian Folktales was catalyzed by the works of the Brothers Grimm and their collections of fairytales. With their first volume which sold out and prompted several other collections of Norwegian folk tales in the later years. The publication of fairytales marked a unique separation and definition of Norwegian culture. With Norway gaining partial independence in 1814 through a written constitution. Allowing separate and personal Norwegian culture to grow and flourish.

== Plot ==
One Sunday, a wife and husband looked at their cornfield by the side of a river. Seeing that the corn is ready for harvest the husband announces that they must reap it tomorrow. The wife being contrary says that they should clip it instead. This argument goes back and forth as the wife is adamant about the corn being clipped and not reaped. She jumps around, clipping her fingers like shears to emphasize the point.

The husband, hoping to get his way, takes the wife out into the river and holds her head over the water, asking if the corn should still be clipped. The wife angrily replies that the corn should be clipped, causing the husband to push the wife under the water and pull her out again. This argument continues, with the wife being dunked each time. When asked again if the corn should still be clipped the contrary wife replies the same with her still-clipping fingers. This continues until the husband has had enough and drowns the wife.

The next day, the husband, feeling bad that his wife isn't at rest on Christian soil, decides to go with his neighbors and drag the river for his wife. However, they are unable to find the drowned wife. The husband remembers how contrary his wife was and decides to search upstream instead of the normal downstream. Up the river, above a fall, lies the wife, contrary to the flow of the water as she was in life.

== Themes ==
=== Lack of knowledge ===
The folktale of "The Contrary-Minded Women" is not unique to Norwegian Culture but is widespread throughout many cultures and iterations. Stories are found in England, Germany, Finland, Spain, Russia, and Pakistan. Iterations are also found in famous plays and religious texts such as The Taming of the Shrew by Shakespeare and in the Book of Esther in the Bible. All of these various stories may have small differences but boil down to the same theme and plot. This theme and plot is best shown inside the Aaarne-Thompson-Uther tale-type index which breaks down the plots and themes of fairy tales into repeated traditions, versions and themes. The Contradictory Women along with all its similar stories such as the taming of the shrew, falls into a type 901 folktale. A Type 901 has a storyline of a wise Husband and a contrary wife of little knowledge. Throughout the story, the wife is constantly contrary objecting to all actions done by the husband. These actions from the wife cause her to be cast out, killed, or punished. Enforcing the theme that in being contrary and of little knowledge, a person is only to find disaster and misfortune. This theme can be seen directly in the folktale. When the wife has been discovered up the river, they comment on her downfall, saying, "There is nothing so dangerous as little knowledge".

=== Gender roles ===
The story can also be analyzed through the lens of gender roles in early Europe. Type 901 is part of a larger section from type 900–909, which focuses directly on the theme of "Realistic Tales [in which an] Obstinate Wife Learns to Obey" where the wife is directly referenced as the shrew and contrary one. Having the wife as the shrew or contrary character follows across all stories and across cultures unanimously. When looking at Type 901 in this sense we see the presence of “the ‘uppity’ wife [which] exposes the male-chauvinist tendency [of] larger folk tradition“ This turns our theme from the downfalls of being contrary and of little knowledge, and to the theme of the wife being subservient to the husband. This appears directly with the narrator noting, “whatever he was for, she was always against.” (P. Chr. Asbjørnsen and Jørgen Moe) The use of only wives to show the consequences of being contrary perpetuates the message of "Obey My Will or Suffer" in relation to the marital constructs of the time. "The legend clearly reflects the idea that women should be obedient and submissive to their husbands and that this submission could be brought about by violence and/or ridicule". This theme shows a window into older ideals and the status quo in early Norway building ideas for marital fear-mongering.
