= The Companion (fairy tale) =

Norwegian fairy tale

"The Companion" (Norwegian: Følgesvennen) is a Norwegian fairy tale, published in Norwegian Folktales (1841–1844) by Asbjørnsen and Moe.

The tale follows a young boy who sets out to search for his dream princess. On the way, he ransoms a sinner who had been put into a block of ice. A short time thereafter, he meets a mysterious figure. This companion helps him through the hardships he must go through to win the princess.

== Legacy ==
A simulator in Second Life is based upon the tale.

An episode of "The Fairytaler" adapts this.
