= Gertrude's Bird =

Norwegian fairy tale

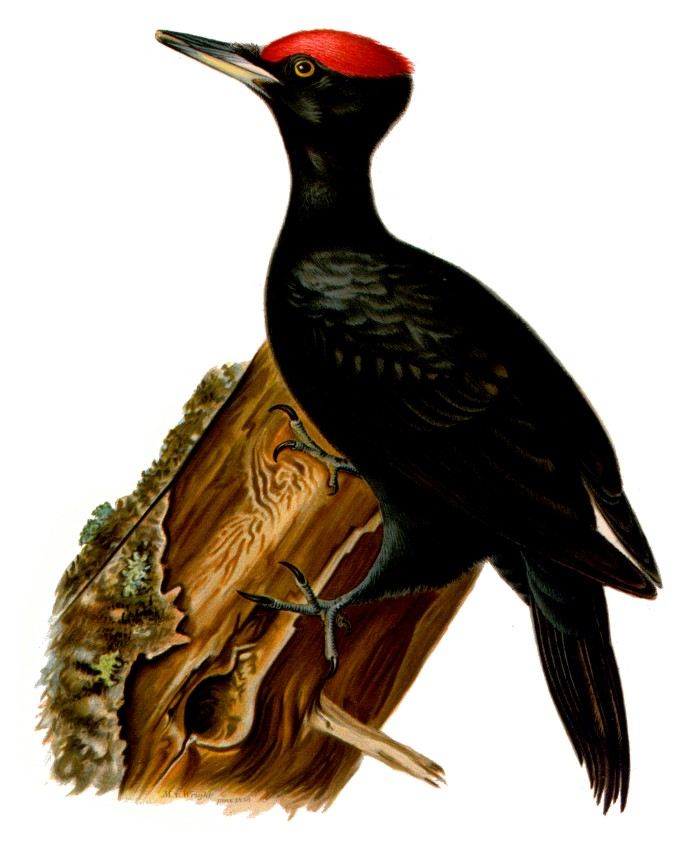
Gjertrudsfuglen is an old Norwegian name for the Black woodpecker (Dryocopus martius). The name comes from an old tale with the same name.

Gertrude's Bird (Gjertrudsfuglen) is a Norwegian fairy tale collected by Peter Christen Asbjørnsen and Jørgen Moe in their Norske Folkeeventyr. The adventure is part of Asbjørnsen and Moe's collection of Norwegian Folk Tales, which was first published in the period 1841-1844. Of a total of 22 known legends in Norway Gjertrudsfuglen is the most prevalent. The adventure should be known in 39 variants.

== Synopsis ==
In those days when Jesus and St. Peter wandered upon earth, they came to a house where lived a woman named Gertrude. They were both hungry and asked for a taste of lefse. She took a tiny piece of dough, but it covered the whole griddle just the same, and she thought it too large to give to them. She tried twice more, each time with less dough, but could not make a lefse small enough. So she refused to give them anything.

Our Lord punished her by transforming her into a bird that immediately flies up through the chimney. The bird, later known as the woodpecker, can be seen with a black body and a red hat, where it pecks for food between bark and wood and beeps thirsty against the rain.

== Related reading ==
- Asbjørnsen, Peter Christen; Moe, Jørgen (1888) East o' the Sun and West o' the Moon . (Edinburgh: David Douglass)
- Gorman, Gerard (2004) Woodpeckers of Europe: A Study of the European Picidae (Bruce Coleman Books) ISBN 1-872842-05-4.
