= The Husband Who Was to Mind the House =

Norwegian fairy tale

The Husband Who Was to Mind the House is a Norwegian fairy tale collected by Peter Christen Asbjørnsen and Jørgen Moe in their Norske Folkeeventyr.

It is Aarne-Thompson type 1408 The man who does his wife's work.

== Synopsis ==
A husband complains so much about his wife that she suggests that he stay home and do her work. He agrees. He starts to churn butter, but decides to get ale. He hears the pig upstairs, runs to stop it, but does not arrive in time to keep it from overturning the churn, and forgets the ale, which runs all over the cellar.

He gets more milk to churn, but remembers that the cow is still in the barn. Since he cannot take her to the meadow, he decides to put her on the sod roof. He carries the churn to keep the baby from overturning it, but he goes for water for the cow, and spills all the milk down the well.

It is near dinner and he doesn't have any butter. He sets on the water to boil for porridge, but goes up to tie the cow so she won't fall off, and ties the end of the rope to himself. He goes to grind grain for the porridge, but the cow falls off, and because he has run the rope through the chimney, it drags him up. The wife returns and cuts the rope so the cow comes down, but she finds her husband with his head stuck in the pot.
