= The Blue Belt =

Norwegian fairy tale

Folk tale
- Name: The Blue Belt
- Also known as: Det blå båndet
- Aarne–Thompson grouping: ATU 590 (The Prince and the Arm Bands)
- Mythology: Norwegian
- Region: Norway
- Published in: Norske Folkeeventyr by Peter Christen Asbjørnsen and Jørgen Moe
- Related: Sir George Webbe Dasent

The Blue Belt (Norwegian: Det blå båndet) is a Norwegian fairy tale collected by Peter Christen Asbjørnsen and Jørgen Moe in Norske Folkeeventyr. It is Aarne-Thompson type 590.

== Plot summary ==
A beggar woman and her son were returning home when he saw a blue belt. She forbade him to pick it up, but after a time, he snuck away from her and got it, and it made him feel as strong as a giant. When she had to rest, he climbed a crag and saw light. He came down to his mother to suggest they seek shelter there. When she could go no further, he carried her, but she saw that the house was that of trolls. He insisted, and she fainted. A 20-foot-tall (6.1 m) old man was within. The boy called him "grandfather" and he said he had been sitting there three hundred years without anyone calling him grandfather. They talked, and the old man prepared supper for them by killing an oxen with one hand.

At night, the boy got the cradle, and the old man gave his mother the bed. The old man told the mother that if they got rid of her son, they could live happily together. He promised to crush the boy under rocks at the quarry. The boy went with him the next day, but the boy was unhurt and rolled a stone on the troll which crushed his leg. The troll told the boy's mother that he had a garden with twelve lions in it that would tear the boy to pieces. The mother pretended to be sick and sent the boy for lion's milk, but there, he dashed the biggest of them to pieces, scaring the others, and got the milk. The troll said he didn't believe it, but the boy tossed him to the eleven lions, which had followed, and then rescued him.

The troll then told the old woman that he had two brothers with twelve times his strength. That was why he was here, having been turned out of their home. They had apples that would make someone sleep for three days and three nights, and the boy would be unable to keep from eating them. The old woman sent her son to get her some apples from their garden. He went with the lions, ate some apples, and slept. On the third day, the brothers came, but the lions tore them to pieces. He found a princess that brothers had carried off. She gave him one of the troll's swords. After they lived together for a time, she decided to let her parents know what had happened to her, and sailed off.

He went to see his mother and the troll. She asked for his secret, and he revealed the belt. She tore it off. She and the troll put out his eyes and put him adrift in a small boat. The lions dragged the boat ashore on an island. One day, a lion chased a blind hare, but it fell into a spring, and after that, the hare could avoid things in its path. The lions dunked the boy in the spring, and he regained his sight. He had the lions bring him back, and then stole the belt again. He punished his mother and the troll and set out to find the princess.

The sailors stopped and found an enormous egg. They could not break it, but the boy could. A chick came out. He told the sailors to sail very quickly and leave the boat. A great bird came and sank all the ships. The boy cut its head off.

The boy disguised himself as a dancing bear and was brought to court. The king brought him to the princess, and he revealed himself to her. Then he came to the king and told him he wanted to find the princess. The king warned him that whoever did not find her within a day would be killed. The boy insisted and then led him to the princess. The princess told the king that the boy had rescued her, and so they married.

== Analysis ==
=== Tale type ===
The tale is classified in the international Aarne-Thompson-Uther Index as type ATU 590. Its original name is also the title of the tale type in Norway, according to scholar Ørnulf Hodne's The Types of the Norwegian Folktale.

Folklorist Stith Thompson noted that tale types ATU 315, "The Faithless Sister", and ATU 590, "The Prince and the Arm Bands", were so "closely related" that they seemed to be variations of one type, or, at least, have influenced each other. Both stories related to a betrayal by a female relative (either a sister in type 315, or a mother in type 590), who falls in love with the villain (ogre, robber, devil) and conspires with her new paramour to kill the hero. Professor Hasan El-Shamy concurs with Thompson's assessment, and even declares that types 590 and 315, as well as 590A, "The Treacherous Wife", all "belong" to the same tale type. In the same vein, researcher Christine Shojaei Kawan states that both types are "basically inseparable", and that it is "logical" to assume they are the same narrative.

=== Literary predecessors ===
Scholar Jack Zipes identifies the 13th-century Anglo-Norman metrical romance Beuve de Hampton as containing "the same plot" as type 590. In the same vein, another line of scholarship notes that Spanish-language work Celinos y la adúltera is related to the "Beuve" Cycle and contains strong similarities to types 315, "La Hermana Traidora", and 590, "La Madre Traidora", especially the latter.

=== Distribution ===
Thompson supposed that both tales originated in Romania, since both types "appear primarily" in Eastern Europe: in the Balkans ("particularly Roumania"), in Russia, and in the Baltic. Both tale types also appear in North Africa and the Near East.

El-Shamy also locates types 315 and 590 across North Africa, including among the Berber populations. In the same vein, scholars Ibrahim Muhawi and Sharif Kanaana report that tale type 590 "is popular in the Arabic tradition".

According to Hungarian-American scholar Linda Dégh, the tale type 590 is also popular in Hungary, with 70 variants registered.

According to Richard MacGillivray Dawkins, Greek variants about the hero's mother and her "wicked lover" are found all over Greece, "from Pontos to Epeiros".

=== Parallels ===
Croatian folklorist Maja Bošković-Stulli noted that the Serbo-Croatian epic song Jovan and the Giant Chief, collected by Vuk Karadžić, was a parallel to the tale type 590.

== See also ==
- The Prince and the Princess in the Forest
- Mother and Son (fairy tale) (Belarusian fairy tale)
