= Summary relative =

Biological relationship

Summary relatives are people in a state of relationship that occurs between the biological children of a couple and the biological children of only one parent of the couple. In other words, half-brothers or half-sisters do not share their parents, sharing a family relationship, but not a biological relationship. A family in which one or both spouses have children from a previous marriage, is called the pivot family.

It is wrong to call half siblings with a common father (that's right — "half", or half) or mother (that's right — "half -")

== Legal norms ==
In the legislation of many countries, including Russia, stepfathers or stepmothers, do not possess individual rights and responsibilities towards stepchildren if they were not adopted or foster children. All rights and obligations, if they have not been limited by court order, to preserve the biological parents of the child.
