= Stepfather =

Male stepparent

A stepfather, stepdad, or stepdaddy, is a biologically unrelated male parent married to one's preexisting parent.

A stepfather-in-law is a stepfather of one's spouse. Children from his spouse's previous unions are known as his stepchildren.

== Legal status ==
Stepfathers do not have automatic legal ties with stepchildren. The vast majority of stepfamilies consist of a mother and stepfather. Younger children adjust more quickly to a stepparent than adolescents do.

== In fiction ==
Though less common in literature than stereotypical evil stepmothers, there are also cases of evil stepfathers, such as in the fairy tales The Gold-Bearded Man (in a plot usually featuring a cruel father) and The Little Bull-Calf. One type of such tale features a defeated villain who insists on marrying the hero's mother and makes her help him trick the hero and so defeat him. Such tales include The Prince and the Princess in the Forest and The Blue Belt, although the tales of this type can also feature a different female relation, such as the stepsister in The Three Princes and their Beasts.

In media, evil stepfathers include Claudius in Hamlet (though his role as uncle is more emphasized), Walter Parks Thatcher in Citizen Kane (though this is debatable), Murdstone in Charles Dickens's David Copperfield, the King from the movie Radio Flyer, and Gozaburo Kaiba (who adopted Seto and Mokuba Kaiba) from Yu-Gi-Oh!. The Stepfather depicts an evil father who has murdered his family and subsequent families.

In his opera La Cenerentola, Gioacchino Rossini inverted the tale of Cinderella to have her oppressed by her stepfather. His motive is made explicit, in that providing a dowry to Cenerentola would cut into what he can give to his own daughters. An analogous male figure may also appear as a wicked uncle; like the stepmother, the father's brother may covet the child's inheritance for his own children, and so maltreat his nephews or nieces.

== See also ==
- Adoption
