= Norwegian Folktales =

Collection of Norwegian folktales and legends

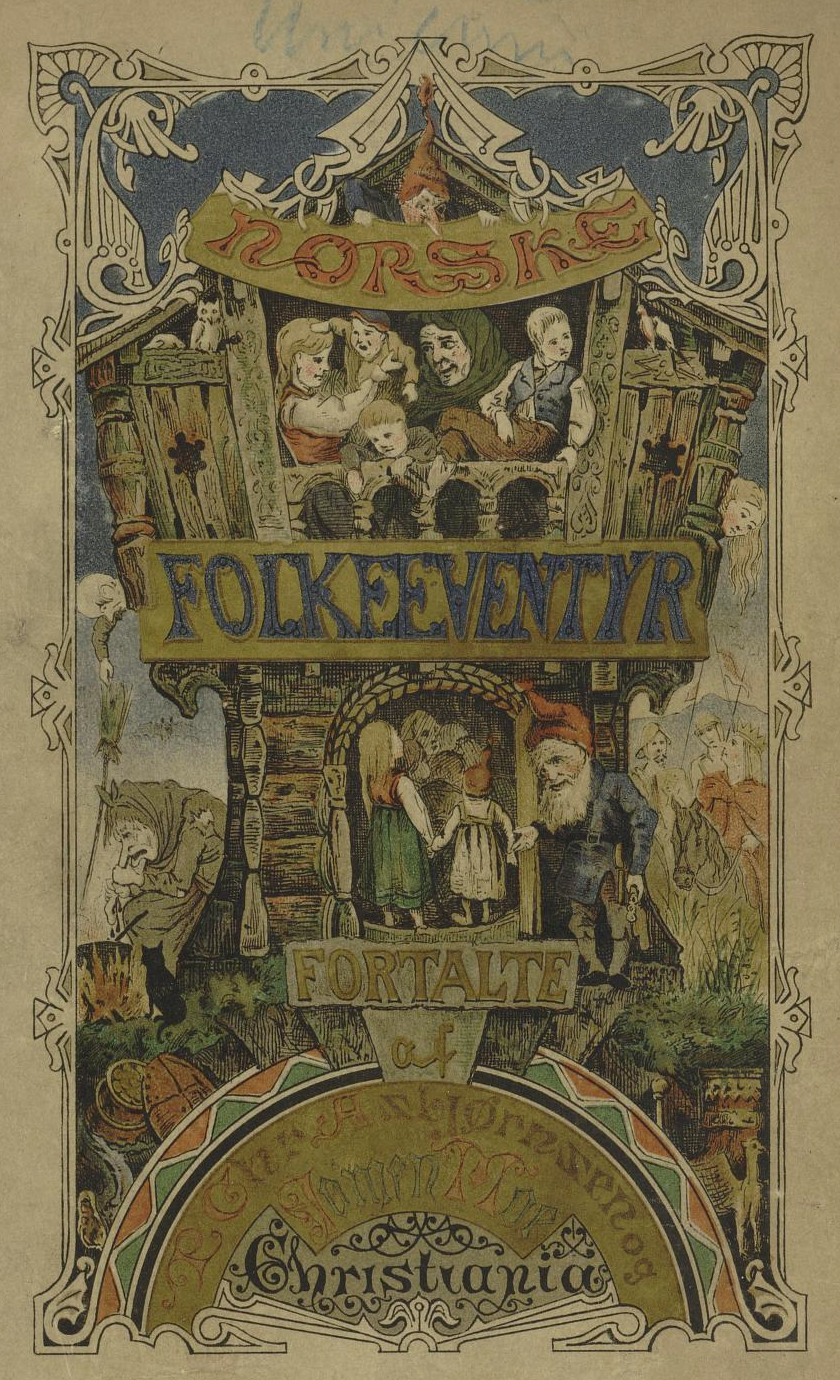
Asbjornsen and Moe's Norske folkeeventyr 5th edition, 1874.

Norwegian Folktales (Norwegian: Norske folkeeventyr) is a collection of Norwegian folktales and legends by Peter Christen Asbjørnsen and Jørgen Moe. It is also known as Asbjørnsen and Moe, after the collectors.

== Asbjørnsen and Moe ==
Asbjørnsen, a teacher, and Moe, a minister, had been friends for about 15 years when in 1841 they published the first volume of folktales – (Note: "[Moe] met Asbjørnsen first when he was fourteen years of age." so 1827.) the collection of which had been an interest of both for some years. The work's popularity is partly attributable to Norway's newly won partial independence, and the wave of nationalism that swept the country in the 19th century; and the Norwegian written language they contributed to developing (i.e., what would become Bokmål). The language of their publication of the fairy tales struck a balance in that, while it did not preserve their original dialect form in its entirety, it did import certain non-Danish features from it (dialect words and certain syntactic constructions). (Note: At the same time the language in the tales also contained many words from Norwegian dialects, which helped toward making a hybrid of older Danish and eastern Norwegian dialects in particular, a language variant that was developed in stages into today's Norwegian bokmål, or "book tongue." Through the later 1800s and the 1900s, bokmål became less Danish through language reforms, and the language of Asbjørnsen and Moe's folk tales followed suit. Their language has been modernized many times. Also, many of these tales were published by Det Norske Samlaget in 1995 in New Norwegian, the most distinctly Norwegian of the two official variants of written Norwegian, and in many cases the language form that comes closest to the tales as recorded by Asbjørnsen and Moe.)

Asbjørnsen and Moe were inspired by the German folktale collectors, the Brothers Grimm, not merely to emulate their methodology, but drawing encouragement by it, their endeavor was a work of national importance, especially as the Grimms openly gave high praise for the Norske folkeeventyr. Asbjørnsen and Moe applied the principles espoused by the Grimms, for instance, using a simple linguistic style in place of dialects, while maintaining the original form of the stories. Moreover, Asbjørnsen and Moe did not publish collected folktales in the raw, but created "retold" versions, seeking to reconstruct the lost Urform (original form) of the tales—although the alterations performed were not as drastic as the Grimms sometimes allowed license for themselves. The Norwegian pair also collected tales from the field themselves, in contrast to the Grimms.

== Publications ==
The original series, entitled Norske Folkeeventyr went into publication piecemeal. It first appeared a slim pamphlet (1841) offering a selection of a few tales, without a title page, the editor's names or table of contents. This was sufficiently well-received, and championed by P. A. Munch in a German newspaper. It led to the appearance of a reprint of the first volume in 1843 and the second volume in 1844 as proper hardcovers. The second edition appeared in 1852. Another series dubbed the "New Collection" appeared later (Norske Folke-Eventyr. Ny Samling 1871). The tales are numbered, the original collection containing 58 tales, increased to 60 tales in later editions. The new collection held 50 tales.

Asbjørnsen as a solo project collected and published Norske Huldre-Eventyr og Folkesagn I-II (1845–48), which also was expanded by a "second collection," (Norske huldre-eventyr og folkesagn: anden samling 1866).

== Illustrators ==
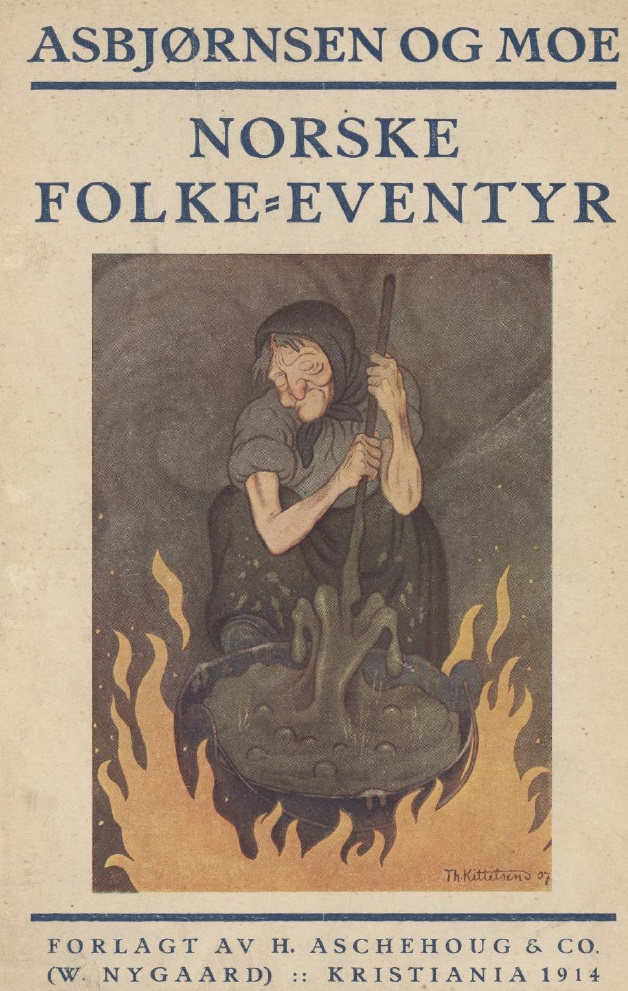
Cover art to 1914 edition, artist: Theodor Kittelsen

The first fully illustrated edition of the book was the 1879 edition of Asbjørnsen's Norske folke- og huldre-eventyr, which featured the artworks of several artists: Peter Nicolai Arbo (1831−1892), Hans Gude (1825−1903), Vincent Stoltenberg Lerche, Eilif Peterssen (1852−1928), August Schneider (1842−1873), Otto Sinding (1842−1909), Adolph Tidemand (1814−1876), and Erik Werenskiold (1855−1938). (Note: The appended "Fortegnelse over Illustrationerne og Kunstnerne" gives credit to each artwork, naming the engravers such as H. P. Hansen and Frederik Hendriksen whose signatures appear in the engravings.)

In later editions, Werenskiold and Theodor Kittelsen became prominent illustrators. Kittelsen was an unknown artist when he began collaborating on the project on the recommendation of his friend Werenskiold. (Note: Iversen (1990) [1960], Introduction, quoted in News of Norway.)

== Translation into English ==
The tales were first translated into English by Sir George Webbe Dasent. (Note: Friedrich Bresemann's German translation of 1847 appeared prior to Dasent's English in 1849.) He translated all but a few of the tales from the two series of Norske Folkeeventyr. Dasent's Popular Tales from the Norse (1859), contains all 58 tales from the initial edition of the original collection. (Note: Dasent splits the two subtales of Bjørnen og reven into 2 independent tales, which brings his tale count to 59.) Dasent's Tales from the Fjeld: A Second Series of Popular Tales (1874) covers the two tales added to later editions of the original collection and 45 of the tales from the new collection. (Note: Dasent's Tales from the Fjeld count 51 tales = 2 original collection + 45 new collection + 3 (counts Bjørnen og reven as 4 separate bear and fox stories) + 1 (The Haunted Mill which is "Kværensagn" taken from Asbjornsen's "Norske Huldre-Eventyr og Folkesagn"))

Asbjørnsen and Moe evidently approved of Dasent's translations: "In France and England collections have appeared in which our tales have not only been correctly and faultlessly translated, but even rendered with exemplary truth and care nay, with thorough mastery. The English translation, by George Webbe Dasent, is the best and happiest rendering of our tales that has appeared."

H. L. Braekstad, Round the Yule Log: Norwegian Folk and Fairy Tales (1881) includes tales from the Norske Huldre-Eventyr. An abridged translation of Stroebe's Nordische Volksmärchen (1922), rendered into English by Martens, provides additional tales from the various collections, and complements the above translations to some extent. Carl Norman's Norwegian Folktales (1960) is a selection that includes some of the tales from the Ny Samling omitted by Dasent.

The most recent translation of Asbjørnsen and Moe's collection into English is by American author and translator Tiina Nunnally. Released in 2019, Nunnally's work is the first new English translation in over 150 years, and the first to include all 60 original tales. It was published by the University of Minnesota Press, and entitled, "The Complete and Original Norwegian Folktales of Asbjørnsen and Moe" by Tiina Nunnally. It included a foreword by Neil Gaiman. In the edition's foreword, author Neil Gaiman wrote of Nunnally's translation, "Each story feels honed, as if it were recently collected from a storyteller who knew how to tell it and who had, in turn, heard it from someone who knew how to tell it." Nunnally's 2019 translation received considerable praise, from sources including the Journal of Folklore Research and the Wall Street Journal.

== List of Norwegian folktales ==
=== Norske Folkeeventyr ===
Legend:

- "NF#" – Tale number as they appear in Asbjørnsen and Moe's Norske Folkeeventyr
- "Modern Norwegian Title" – Modernized spelling (conforms with Projekt Runeberg e-texts).
- "AT index" – Aarne–Thompson classification system index for folktale type.
- "Da#" – Tale number as appears in Dasent's translation, usable as sort key.
- "Br." "Iversen & Nor." "Str. & Martens" "Nunn." – the Braekstad, Iversen & Norman, Stroebe & Martens, and Nunnally translations.

Norske Folkeeventyr
NF#	Modern Norwegian Title	AT index	Da#	English translated title (Dasent)	Alternate translations
1	Askeladden som stjal sølvendene til trollet (Note: The title character was changed from "Askepot" in the first edition to Akeladden in later editions.)	AT 328	32	"Boots and the Troll"	"About Ash Lad, Who Stole the Troll's Silver Ducks, Coverlet, and Golden Harp" (Nunn.)
2	Gjertrudsfuglen	AT 751A	31	"Gertrude's Bird"	"The Gjertrud Bird" (Nunn.)
3	Fugl Dam	AT 301	55	"The Big Bird Dan"	"The Griffin" (Nunn.)
4	Spurningen (Note: Another "slightly different variant" is Prinsessen som ingen kunne målbinde, in Eventyrbog for børn, volume 3.)	AT 853	19	"Taming the Shrew"	"The Quandary" (Nunn.)
5	Rike Per Kremmer	AT 461	30	"Rich Peter the Pedlar"	"Richman Peddler Per" (Nunn.)
6	Askeladden som kappåt med trollet	AT 1000	5	"The Boy Who Had an Eating Match with a Troll"	"Ash Lad, Who Competed with the Troll" (Nunn.); "The Ash Lad Who Had an Eating Match with the Troll" (Iversen & Nor. 4)
7	Gutten som gikk til nordenvinden og krevde igjen melet	AT 563	34	"The Lad Who Went to the North Wind"	"About the Boy Who Went to the North Wind and Demanded the Flour Back" (Nunn.); "The Lad and the North Wind" (Br. 18)
8	Jomfru Maria som gudmor	AT 710	27	"The Lassie and Her Godmother"	"The Virgin Mary as Godmother" (Nunn.); "The Child of Mary" (Str. & Martens 10)
9	De tre prinsesser i Hvittenland	AT 400	26	"The Three Princesses of Whiteland"	"The Three Princesses in White Land" (Nunn.); "The Three Princesses in Whiteland" (Str. & Martens 17)
10	Somme kjerringer er slike	AT 1384	24	"Not a Pin to Choose Between Them"	"Some Women Are Like That" (Nunn.)
11	Hver synes best om sine barn	AT 247	25	"One's Own Children Are Always Prettiest"	"Everyone Thinks Their Own Children Are Best" (Nunn.)
12	En frierhistorie	AT 1459	14	"How One Went Out to Woo"	"A Tale of Courtship" (Nunn.)
13	De tre mostrene	AT 501	28	"The Three Aunts"	ibid. (Nunn.)
14	Enkesønnen	AT 314	44	"The Widow's Son"	"The Widow's Son" (Nunn.); (Br. 26)
15	Manndatteren og kjerringdatteren	AT 480	17	"The Two Step-Sisters"	"The Husband’s Daughter and the Wife’s Daughter" (Nunn.)
16	Hanen og høna i nøtteskogen	AT 2021	54	"The Cock and Hen a-Nutting"	"The Rooster and the Hen in the Nut Forest" (Nunn.)
17	Bjørnen og reven:	—	N/A	(Bear and Fox stories)	"The Bear and the Fox" (Nunn.)
17.1	Hvorfor bjørnen er stubbrumpet;	AT 2	23	"Why the Bear Is Stumpy-Tailed"	"Why the Bear Has a Stump of a Tail" (Nunn.)
17.2	Reven snyter bjørnen for julekosten	AT 15	57	"Bruin and Reynard"	"The Fox Cheats the Bear Out of His Christmas Meal" (Nunn.)
18	Gudbrand i Lia	AT 1415	21	"Gudbrand on the Hill-side"	"Gudbrand Slope" (Nunn.); "Gudbrand of the Hillside" (Iversen & Nor. 9)
19	Kari Trestakk	AT 510AB	50	"Katie Woodencloak"	"Kari Stave-Skirt" (Nunn.); "Kari Woodencoat" (Str. & Martens 19)
20	Reven som gjeter	AT 37	10	"The Fox as Herdsman"	"The Fox as Shepherd" (Nunn.)
21	Smeden som de ikke torde slippe inn i helvete	AT 330	16	"The Master-Smith"	"The Blacksmith They Didn’t Dare Let Into Hell" (Nunn.); "The Smith They Didn't Dare Let Into Hell" (Sehmsdorf); "The Smith and the Devil" (Br. 14)
22	Hanen og høna	AT 2075	15	"The Cock and Hen"	"The Rooster and the Hen" (Nunn.)
23	Hanen, gauken og århanen	AT 120	29	"The Cock, the Cuckoo, and the Blackcock"	"The Rooster, the Cuckoo, and the Black Grouse" (Nunn.)
24	Lillekort	AT 303	20	"Shortshanks"	"Lillekort" (Nunn.)
25	Dukken i gresset	AT 402	52	"Doll i' the Grass"	"The Doll in the Grass" (Nunn.)
26	Pål Andrestua	AT 1725	58	"Tom Totherhouse"	"Paal Next-Door" (Nunn.)
27	Soria Moria slott	AT 400	56	"Soria Moria Castle"	ibid. (Nunn.); (Iversen & Nor. 12); (Str. & Martens 36)
28	Herreper	AT 545B	42	"Lord Peter"	"Sir Per" (Nunn.); "Squire Per" (Iversen & Nor. 25)
29	Vesle Åse Gåsepike	AT 870A	59	"Little Annie the Goose-Girl"	"Little Aase Goosegirl" (Nunn.)
30	Gutten og fanden	AT 1158	53	"The Lad and the Devil"	"The Boy and the Devil" (Nunn.); "The Lad and the Devil" (Br. 4); "The Young Fellow and the Devil" (Str. & Martens 28)
31	De syv folene	AT 471	43	"The Seven Foals"	ibid. (Nunn.)
32	Giske	AT 1353	33	"Goosey Grizzel"	"Gidske" (Nunn.)
33	De tolv villender	AT 451	8	"The Twelve Wild Ducks"	ibid. (Nunn.); (Iversen & Nor. 15)
34	Mestertyven	AT 1525A-F	35	"The Master Thief"	ibid. (Nunn.)
35	Høna tripper i berget	AT 311	3	"The Old Dame and her Hen"	"The Three Sisters Who Were Taken Into the Mountain" (Nunn.)
36	Risen som ikke hadde noe hjerte på seg	AT 302	9	"The Giant Who Had No Heart in His Body"	"About the Giant Troll Who Never Carried His Heart With Him" (Nunn.); "The Giant who had no Heart" (Br. 7); "Anent the Giant Who Did Not Have His Heart About Him" (Str. & Martens 16)
37	Grimsborken	AT 531	40	"Dapplegrim"	"Dappleband" (Nunn.)
38	Det har ingen nød med den som alle kvinnfolk er glad i	AT 580	36	"The Best Wish"	"Nothing is Needed by the One That All Women Love" (Nunn.)
39	Askeladden som fikk prinsessen til å løgste seg	AT 852	7	"Boots Who Made the Princess Say, 'That's A Story'"	"Ash Lad, Who Got the Princess to Say He Was Lying" (Nunn.); "The Ash Lad who made the Princess Say "You're a Liar" " (Iversen & Nor. 18); "Ashiepattle who made the Princess tell the Truth at last" (Br. 28)
40	De tre bukkene Bruse	AT 122E	37	"Three Billy Goats Gruff"	"The Three Billy Goats Gruff, Who Were Supposed to Go Up to the Mountain Pasture to Fatten Up" (Nunn.); "The Three Billy Goats who went up into the Hills to get Fat" (Br. 15)
41	Østenfor sol og vestenfor måne	AT 425	4	"East o' the Sun and West o' the Moon"	ibid. (Nunn.); (Br. 27); (Str. & Martens 22)
42	Høna som skulle til Dovre forat ikke allverden skulle forgå	AT 20C	49	"The Cock and Hen That Went to the Dovrefell"	"The Hen Who Had to Go to Dovre Mountain, or Else the Whole World Would Perish" (Nunn.)
43	Mannen som skulle stelle hjemme	AT 1408	39	"The Husband Who Was to Mind the House"	"The Man Who Had to Keep House" (Nunn.); "The Man who was going to Mind the House" (Br. 5)
44	Tommeliten	AT 700	51	"Thumbikin"	"Tom Thumb" (Nunn.)
45	Håken Borkenskjegg	AT 900	6	"Hacon Grizzlebeard"	"Haaken Speckled-Beard" (Nunn.)
46	Mestermø	AT 313	11	"The Mastermaid"	"Master Maiden" (Nunn.); "Master Girl" (Str. & Martens 15)
47	Vel gjort og ille lønnet	AT 154	38	"Well Done and Ill Paid"	"Well Done and Poorly Rewarded" (Nunn.)
48	Tro og Utro	AT 613	1	"True and Untrue"	ibid. (Nunn.)
49	Per, Pål og Espen Askeladd	AT 577	46	"Boots and His Brothers"	"Per and Paal and Esben Ash Lad" (Nunn.)
50	Kvernen som står og maler på havsens bunn	AT 565	2	"Why the Sea is Salt"	"The Mill That Keeps Grinding at the Bottom of the Sea" (Nunn.); "The Mill that Grinds at the bottom of the Sea" (Iversen & Nor. 30)
51	Jomfruen på glassberget	AT 530	13	"The Princess on the Glass Hill"	"The Maiden on the Glass Mountain" (Nunn.)
52	Smørbukk	AT 327C	18	"Buttercup"	"Butterball" (Nunn.); "Smorbukk (Butterball)" (Iversen & Nor. 11)
53	Store-Per og Vesle-Per	AT 1535	47	"Big Peter and Little Peter"	"Big-Per and Little-Per" (Nunn.)
54	Lurvehette	AT 711	48	"Tatterhood"	"Ragged-Cap" (Nunn.)
55	Buskebrura	AT 403	45	"Bushy Bride"	"The Bushy Bride" (Nunn.)
56	Kjetta på Dovre	AT 1161	12	"The Cat on the Dovrefjell"	"The Tabby-Cat on Dovre Mountain" (Nunn.)
57	Bonde Værskjegg	AT 325	41	"Farmer Weathersky"	"Farmer Weather-Beard" (Nunn.)
58	Det blå båndet	AT 590	22	"The Blue Belt"	"The Blue Twine" (Nunn.)
59	Den rettferdige firskilling	AT 1651	62	"The Honest Penny"	"The Honest Four-Skilling Coin" (Nunn.); "The Four-Shilling Piece" (Str. & Martens 12)
60	Han far sjøl i stua	AT 168A	66	"Father Bruin in the Corner"	"The Old Man of the House" (Nunn.)

=== Norske Folkeeventyr Ny Samling ===
New Collection. The NF# will be given contiguous from the original collection.

NF Ny Samling
NF#	Modern Norwegian Title	AT index	Da#	English translated title (Dasent)	Alternate translations
61	Væren og grisen som skulle til skogs og bo for seg selv	AT 130	101	"The Sheep and the Pig Who Set up House"	"The Ram and the Pig who went into the Woods to live by Themselves" (Iversen & Nor. 23)
62	Venner i liv og død	AT 470	86	"Friends in Life and Death"	
63	Gutten som skulle tjene tre år uten lønn	AT 560	88	"Three Years without Wages"	"The Youth Who Was to Serve Three Years Without Pay" (Str. & Martens 33)
64	Kjerringa mot strømmen	AT 1365AB	94	"Goody Gainst-the-stream"	"The Old Woman against the Stream" (Iversen & Nor. 20)
65	Den syvende far i huset	AT 726	87	"The Father of the Family"	"The Seventh Father of the House" (Iversen & Nor. 24); "The Seven Fathers in the House" (Br. 11)
66	Tre sitroner	AT 408	84	"The Three Lemons"	ibid. (Str. & Martens 3)
67	Kjæresten i skogen	AT 955	97	"The Sweetheart in the Wood"	
68	Ikke kjørende og ikke ridende	AT 875	95	"How to Win a Prince"	"Not Driving and not Riding" (Iversen & Nor. 26)
69	Skipperen og Gamle-Erik	AT 1179	93	"The Skipper and Old Nick"	"The Skipper and Sir Urian" (Str. & Martens 32)
70	Gutten som gjorde seg til løve, falk og maur	AT 302	96	"Boots and the Beasts"	"The Boy Who Became a Lion, a Falcon, and an Ant"(Lunge-Larsen)
71	Tobakksgutten	AT 611	81	"Master Tobacco"	
72	Gullslottet som hang i luften	AT 531	102	"The Golden Palace That Hung in the Air"	"The Golden Castle that Hung in the Air" (Iversen & Nor. 6)
73	Haren som hadde vært gift	AT 96	76	"The Hare and the Heiress"	"The Hare who had been Married" (Iversen & Nor. 14)
74	Bjørnen og reven:	N/A		The Bear and the Fox (Part of "Peter's Beast Stories")	
74.1	Slipp granrot og ta i revefot	AT 5	77	"Slip Root, Catch Reynard's Foot"	
74.2	De vedder om flesk og humlebol	AT 7	75	"Pork and Honey"	"The Bear and the Fox Who Made a Bet" (Iversen & Nor. 1)
74.3	De skulle ha åker i sameie	AT 1030	79	"Bruin and Reynard Partners"	
74.4	Mikkel vil smake hestekjøtt	AT 47A	80	"Reynard Wants to Taste Horse-Flesh"	
75	Bamse Brakar	AT 116	78	"Bruin Goodfellow"	"Brave Old Bruin" (Br. 12)
76	Rødrev og Askeladden	AT 300	99	"Osborn Boots and Mr. Glibtongue"	
77	Gutten som ville fri til datter til mor i kroken	AT 402	104	"Mother Roundabout's Daughter"	"The Youth Who Wanted to Win the Daughter of the Mother in the Corner" (Str. & Martens 34)
78	Dumme menn og troll til kjerringer	AT 1406	90	"Silly Men and Cunning Wives"	"Foolish Men and Scolding Wives" (Br. 22)
79	Askeladden og de gode hjelperne	AT 513	106	"Boots and his Crew"	"The Ash Lad and the Good Helpers" (Iversen & Nor. 8)
80	Gutten som ville bli handelskar	AT 1538	100	"This is the Lad who Sold the Pig"	
81	Hårslå, som aldri ville hjem gå	AT 2015	98	"How they Got Hairlock Home"	
82	Kullbrenneren	AT 1641	82	"The Charcoal Burner"	ibid. (Br. 33)
83	Gullfuglen	AT 550	110	"The Golden Bird "	ibid. (Iversen & Nor. 5)
84	Den grønne ridder	AT 432	105	"The Green Knight"	
85	Tyrihans som fikk kongsdatteren til å le	AT 571	91	"Taper Tom"	"Taper Tom - Who Made the Princess Laugh" (Iversen & Nor. 28); "Hans who made the Princess Laugh" (Br. 30)
86	Presten og klokkeren	AT 922	85	"The Priest and the Clerk"	"The Parson and the Sexton" (Str. & Martens 31, Nor. 21); "The Parson and the Clerk" (Br. 23)
87	Gale-Mattis	AT 1696	108	"Silly Matt"	
88	Klokkeren i bygda vår	AT 1537	89	"Our Parish Clerk"	
89	Småguttene som traff trollene på Hedalsskogen	AT 303	92	"The Trolls in Hedale Wood"	"The Boys Who Met the Trolls in the Hedal Woods" (Iversen & Nor. 13); "The Lads who Met the Trolls in the Hedale Wood" (Br. 2)
90	Kvitebjørn kong Valemon	AT 425	109	"King Valemon, the White Bear"	"Valemon - The White Bear King" (Iversen & Nor. 16)
91	Skrinet med det rare i	AT 2250	83	"The Box with Something Pretty in It"	"The Box with the Funny Thing in it" (Br. 25)
92	Hjemmusa og fjellmusa	AT 112	107	"The Town-mouse and the Fell-mouse"	"The House Mouse and the Country Mouse" (Iversen & Nor. 19)
93	God dag, mann! -- Økseskaft	AT 1968J	68	"Goodman Axehaft"	"'Good Day, Fellow!' 'Axe Handle!'" (Iversen & Nor. 7)
94	Hanen og reven	AT 61	67	"Reynard and Chanticleer "	
95	Verden lønner ikke annerledes	AT 155	73	"The Way of the World"	
96	Mumle Gåsegg	AT 650A	65	"Grumblegizzard"	"The Greedy Youngster" (Br. 10); "Murmur Goose-egg"(Str. & Martens 23)
97	Veslefrikk med fela	AT 592	103	"Little Freddy With his Fiddle"	"Little Freddie and his Fiddle" (Iversen & Nor. 10)
98	Gjete kongens harer	AT 570	60	"Osborn's Pipe"	"Ashiepattle and the King's Hares" (Br. 19): "The King's Hares" (Str. & Martens 25)
99	Krambugutten med gammelostlasten	AT 506	70	"The Shopboy and His Cheese"	
100	Følgesvennen	AT 507A	69	"The Companion"	"The Companion" (Iversen & Nor. 2); "The Comrade" (Str. & Martens 6)
101	Peik	AT 1542	71	"Peik"	ibid. (Br. 21)
102	Kjetta som var så fæl til å ete	AT 2027	64	"The Greedy Cat"	The Cat Who Could Eat So Much (Str. & Martens 21)
103	Hanen som falt i bryggekaret	AT 2022	63	"The Death of Chanticleer"	
104	Pannekaken	AT 2025	74	"The Pancake"	ibid. (Br. 8); "The Chronicle of the Pancake" (Str. & Martens 35)
105	Gutten med øldunken	AT 332	72	"Death and the Doctor"	
106	Fanden og futen	AT 1186	N/A	N/A	"The Devil and the Baliff" (Iversen & Nor. 3)
107	Stabbursnøkkelen i rokkehodet	AT 1453	N/A	N/A	"The Key in the Distaff" (Iversen & Nor. 29)
108	Tsju pus, vil du ned av bordet!	AT 1456	N/A	N/A	(Shoo cat, off the table)
109	Sju år gammal graut	AT 1462	N/A	N/A	(Seven-year-old porridge)
110	Herremannsbruden	AT 1440	N/A	N/A	"The Squire's Bride" (Iversen & Nor. 27)

=== Norske Huldre-Eventyr ===
Legend:

- "Hu#" – Tale number in Norske Huldre-Eventyr (1845–48), with continuous numbering for the "second collection" (1866)
- "Modern Norwegian Title" – Modernized spelling (conforms to Projekt Runeberg e-texts).
- "Year" – Year of collection. Enumerated in the index and under the title in the 3rd edition (1870).
- "Br#" – Tale number as appears in Braekstad's Round the Yule Log.
- "Str. & Martens" – Stroebe & Martens translation.
- "Chr. & Iversen" – Christiansen ed., translated by Pat Shaw Iversen.

Huldre-Eventyr Part 1
Hu#	Modern Norwegian Title	Year	Br#	English translated title (Braekstad)	Alternate translations
Hu1	Kvernsagn (cf. Kvernknurr)	1843	17	"Legends of the Mill"	"The Haunted Mill" (first tale and a composite of the second and third tales, Dasent); "Self Did It" (second tale, Str. & Martens 14)
Hu2	Ekebergkongen	1838			
Hu3	Matthias skytters historier	1838	3	"Matthias the Hunter's Stories"	
Hu4	Berthe Tuppenhaugs fortellinger	1843	13	"Mother Bertha's Stories"	"The Troll Wedding" (Str. & Martens 8)
Hu5	En aftenstund i et proprietærkjøkken	1845	29	"An Evening in the Squire's Kitchen"	"The Troll-Wife" (Str. & Martens 24)
Hu6	Huldreætt	1843			
Hu7	En halling med kvannerot	1845			
Hu8	Lundeætten	1845			
Hu9	En gammeldags juleaften	1843	1	"An Old-Fashioned Christmas Eve"	
Hu10	En natt i Nordmarken	1845			"The Neighbor Underground" (Str. & Martens 4)
Hu11	En aften ved Andelven	1845			"The Hat of the Huldres" (Str. & Martens 9)
Hu12	Graverens fortellinger	1845			"Following the Witch" and "The Witches's Sabbath" (Chr. & Iversen 17a 17b)
Hu13	Jutulen og Johannes Blessom	1844	24	"The Giant and Johannes Blessom"	"The Lord of the Hill and John Blessom" (Str. & Martens 27); "The Jutul and Johannes Blessom" (Chr. & Iversen 35)
Hu14	Fra fjellet og seteren	1845			

Huldre-Eventyr Part 2
Hu#	Modern Norwegian Title	Year	Br#	English translated title (Braekstad)	Alternate translations
Hu15	Høyfjellsbilleder:	1848			
Hu15.1	1: En søndagskveld til seters				"Ola Storbaekkjen" (Str. & Martens 20)
Hu15.2	2: Rensdyrjakt ved Rondane		16	"Peter Gynt"	
Hu16	Plankekjørerne	1848			"Making the Devil Carry the Cat" and "The Cardplayers and the Devil" (Chr. & Iversen 13 14)
Hu17	En tiurleik i Holleia	1848	9	"A Day with the Capercailzies"	
Hu18	En signekjerring	1848	32	"The Witch"	
Hu19	En sommernatt på Krokskogen	1848	31	A Summer Night in a Norwegian Forest	
Hu20	Tatere	1848			
Hu21	En aften i nabogården	1853			
Hu22	Fra Sognefjorden	1855			
Hu23	Til Haus				
Hu23.1	Skarvene fra Utrøst	1849	6	"The Cormorants of Udröst"	"The Isle of Udrost" (Str. & Martens 2); "The Cormorants from Utröst" (Chr. & Iversen 26)
Hu23.2	Tuftefolket på Sandflesa	1851			"Lucky Andrew" (Str. & Martens 30); "The Tufte-Folk on Sandflesa" (Chr. & Iversen 27)
Hu23.3	Makrelldorg	1851	20	"Mackerel Trolling"	"Storm Magic" (Str. & Martens 11)
Hu23.4	På høyden av Aleksandria	1852			"Hexe Pfarrerin" (Stroebe, in German)

=== Other pieces ===
Tales not from any of the proceeding series that are usually included alongside them in later collections:

From other works
#	Modern Norwegian Title	Year	AT Motif	English translated title (various)	Alternate translations
*	De tre kongsdøtre i berget det blå (from Eventyrbog for Børn 1883-1887, Asbjørnsen and Moltke Moe edd.)			"The Three Princesses in the Mountain in the Blue" (Iversen & Nor. 31)	
*	En prestehistorie (from «Dybwads illustrerte Folkekalender 1881», Moltke Moe.)				
*	Prinsessen som ingen kunne målbinde (from Eventyrbog for Børn 1883-1887, Asbjørnsen and Moltke Moe edd.) (Note: Prinsessen som ingen kunne målbinde is a slight variant of the tale Spurningen from Norske Folkeeventyr, and replaces it in most subsequent publications.)		AT 853	"The Princess who always had to have the Last Word " (Iversen & Nor. 22)	
*	En vestlandsk Skovdal (from "Fra nordiske Digtere. Et Album" 1869)				
*	Fiskersønnene (from «Dybwads illustrerte Folkekalender 1881»)		AT 303		
*	Grisen og levemåten hans (from Barne-Eventyr 1909, Moltke Moe ed.)		AT 211	"The Pig and his Way of Life" (Kari B. Svendsen, 1985)	
*	Gullfebla (from Juletræet for 1850)				
*	Jomfru Maria og svalen (from Eventyrbog for Barn 1883-1337. Asbjørnsen and Moltke Moe edd.)				
*	Julebesøket i prestegården (from Juletræet for 1851)				
*	Prestens mor				
*	Reve-enka (from Barne-Eventyr 1909. Moltke Moe.)				
*	Vårherre og St. Peder på vandring (Et bömisk eventyr.) (from Nord und Süd 1858)				

== Influence ==
The Soria Moria castle, which appeared in Dasent's translations of the tales, inspired J. R. R. Tolkien to use the name Moria for a fabulous subterranean complex in his Middle-earth stories.

== Footnotes ==
=== References ===
==== Bibliography ====
Texts

- Asbjørnsen, Peter Christen; Moe, Jørgen, eds. (1843). Norske folke-eventyr. Vol. 1. Christiania: Johan Dahl. Nasjonalbiblioteket copy - #1 to Die tre Bukkerne (here #41)
  - 1st edition, 2den Deels 1ste Hefte - #42 to Jomfruen på glassberget (here #52.)
  - 2nd edition, Christiania: Johan Dahls Forlag (1852) copy
  - 3rd edition, Christiania: Jacob Dybwad (1866)
  - 4th ed., Christiania: Jacob Dybwad, (1868-1871)
  - 5th ed., Christiania: Jacob Dybwad (1874)
  - 7th ed., Christiania: H. Aschehoug & Co (1904)
    - Asbjørnsen, Peter Christen; Moe, Jørgen; Moe, Moltke, eds. (1904a). Norske folke-eventyr. Vol. 1 (7th ed.). Christiania: H. Aschehoug & Co.
    - Asbjørnsen, Peter Christen; Moe, Jørgen; Moe, Moltke, eds. (1904b). Norske folke-eventyr. Vol. 2 (7th ed.). Christiania: H. Aschehoug & Co.
- Asbjørnsen, Peter Christen; Moe, Jørgen, eds. (1871). Norske folke-eventyr: ny samling. Dybwad i Komm.etext via Internet Archive
  - 2nd edition, Kjøbenhavn: J. Jørgensen & Co. (1876)
- Asbjørnsen, Peter Christen, ed. (1859). Norske huldre-eventyr og folkesagn. Vol. 1 (2nd ed.). Christiania: P.J. Steensballes Forlag. - base for the Stroebe (1922a) German translation.
- ——, ed. (1870). Norske huldre-eventyr og folkesagn (3rd ed.). Christiania: P.J. Steensballes Forlag.
- Asbjørnsen, Peter Christen, ed. (1879). Norske Folke- og Huldre-Eventyr. Kjøbenhavn: Gyldendalske. - base for the Braekstad (1881) translation.
- ——, ed. (1896). Norske Folke- og Huldre-Eventyr (2nd ed.). Kjøbenhavn: Gyldendalske. - non-Fraktur typeface
- Asbjørnsen, Peter Christen; Moe, Jørgen, eds. (1883). Eventyrbog for Børn. Norske Folkeeventyr. Vol. 1. Copenhagen: Gyldendalske Boghandels Forlag.
  - Vol. 2 (1884) copy at HathiTrust
  - Vol. 3 (1887)
  - Vol. 1, 2nd ed., w/ Moltke Moe (1898)
- Asbjørnsen, Peter Christen; Moe, Jørgen, eds. (1908). Eventyrbok for børn: norske folkeeventyr. Vol. 1 (3rd ed.). Copenhagen: Gyldendalske Boghandels Forlag.
  - Vol. 2 (1908)
  - Vol. 3, 2nd ed. (1908)

Translations

- Braekstad, H. L., tr., ed. (1881). Round the Yule Log: Norwegian Folk and Fairy Tales. Originally edited by Peter Christen Asbjørnsen. Nasjonalbiblioteket copy
- Bresemann, Friedrich, tr., ed. (1847). Norwegische Volksmährchen (in German). Vol. 1. Asbjørnsen and Moe (orig. edd.); Ludwig Tieck (foreword). Berlin: M. Simion.
- Christiansen, Reidar, ed. (2016) [1964]. Folktales of Norway. Translated by Iversen, Pat Shaw. University of Chicago Press. ISBN 022637520X.
- Dasent, G. W., tr., ed. (1859). Popular Tales from the Norse. Asbjørnsen and Moe (2nd, enlarged ed.). Edinburgh: Edmonston and Douglas.
- Dasent, G. W., tr., ed. (1874). Tales from the Fjeld: A Second Series of Popular Tales. Asbjørnsen and Moe (orig. edd.). Chapman & Hall.
- Nunnally, Tiina, tr., ed. (2019). The Complete and Original Norwegian Folktales of Asbjornsen & Moe. Minneapolis: University of Minnesota Press. ISBN 1-452-96455-6.
- Iversen, Pat Shaw, ed. (1990) [1960]. Norwegian Folktales. Translated by Norman, Carl. Asbjørnsen and Moe (orig. eds.). Pantheon Books. pp. 17–18. ISBN 82-09-10598-1.
- Stroebe, Klara (1922a). Nordische Volksmärchen. Teil 1: Dänemark/Schweden (in German). Asbjornsen and Moe (orig. eds.). E. Diederichs. Teil 1 via Google Books
- Stroebe, Klara (1922b). Nordische Volksmärchen. Teil 2: Schweden (in German). Asbjornsen and Moe (orig. eds.). E. Diederichs. Teil 2 via Google Books
- Stroebe, Klara, ed. (1922). Norwegian Fairy Book. Translated by Martens, Frederick H. Asbjornsen and Moe (orig. eds.); George W. Hood (illus.). Frederick A. Stokes Company.; e-text via Internet

Other

- Wells, Marie (2013), "Asbjørnsen, Peter Christen, and Jørgen Moe", in Murray, Christopher John (ed.), Encyclopedia of the Romantic Era, 1760-1850, Routledge, pp. 35–36, ISBN 978-1135455798
