= Engebret Olsen Moe =

Norwegian politician

Engebret Olsen Moe (22 July 1780 – 9 May 1849) was a Norwegian Member of parliament.

Engebret Olsen Moe was born at Vaker in Norderhov, now Ringerike, Norway. He was a farmer at Mo Gård in Hole, Buskerud, Norway. He served as mayor of the municipality of Hole from 1848 to 1849 and was a member of the Parliament of Norway. He was elected to Parliament in 1815, representing the rural constituency of Buskeruds Amt. He was re-elected in 1830, 1833 and 1839.

Moe was married in 1805 to Marthe Jørgensdatter Moe (1786–1846), with whom he had eight children. Their children included Jørgen Moe, noted folklorist, poet, author and Bishop in the Church of Norway. Their grandchildren included Moltke Moe who was a folklorist and professor at the University of Christiania.
