= Almondseed and Almondella =

Almondseed and Almondella is a Greek fairy tale collected by Georgios A. Megas in Folktales of Greece.

It is Aarne-Thompson type 1641 Doctor Know-All. Other tales of this type are Doctor Know-all and The Charcoal Burner.

== Synopsis ==
A poor man sees a black hen, tied to the weaver's, and hears a woman calling for help because her black hen has been stolen. To pretend to learn where it is, he reads a book, and she gives him two piastres. He decides to become a seer. One day, the king's servants come, asking whether the queen will have a boy or a girl; the seer reads through his book, muttering "Boy, girl, boy, girl..." until they tire of it and leave. The queen has twins, a boy and a girl, and the servants tell the king. The king, whose coffer has been stolen, sends for the seer to learn about the theft. In a room, he asks for almonds; the first night, he says, "This is the first", meaning the first night, but one of three thieves is eavesdropping and thinks it means him. He runs to his confederates. The second one arrives the next night, and when the seer says, "The second has come", meaning the night, the thief takes it to mean him. When the third thief hears him the third night, they beg for mercy and show him where they have hid the coffer. The seer presents it to the king. They then walk in the garden, where the king picks an almond from a tree and asks the seer what he has in his hand. The seer's name is Almondseed, and his wife is Almondella. He speaks of Almondseed, whom Almondella let fall into the king's hand, but the king takes it for the almond and its tree, and gives him gold.
