= Non sequitur (literary device) =

Conversational literary device

A non sequitur (English: /nɒn ˈsɛkwɪtər/ non SEK-wit-ər, Classical Latin: [noːn ˈsɛkᶣɪtʊr]; "[it] does not follow") is a conversational literary device, often used for comedic purposes. It is something said that, because of its apparent lack of meaning relative to what preceded it, seems absurd to the point of being humorous or confusing. This use of the term is distinct from the non sequitur in logic, where it is a fallacy.

== Etymology ==
The expression is Latin for "[it] does not follow". It comes from the words non meaning "not" and the verb sequi meaning "to follow".

== Usage ==
A non sequitur can denote an abrupt, illogical, or unexpected turn in plot or dialogue by including a relatively inappropriate change in manner. A non sequitur joke sincerely has no explanation, but it reflects the idiosyncrasies, mental frames and alternative world of the particular comic persona.

Comic artist Gary Larson's The Far Side cartoons are known for what Larson calls "absurd, almost non sequitur animal" characters, such as talking cows, to create a bizarre effect. He gives the example of a strip where "two cows in a field gaze toward burning Chicago, saying 'It seems that agent 6373 had accomplished her mission.'"

== See also ==
- Anacoluthon
- Anti-humor
- Cow tools – 1982 The Far Side cartoon
- Dada
- Derailment (thought disorder)
- "Good day, fellow!" "Axe handle!" – Scandinavian folktale and non-sequitur
- Gibberish
- Roger Irrelevant
- Surreal humour
