= Mimi Frellsen =

Norwegian photographer (1830–1914)

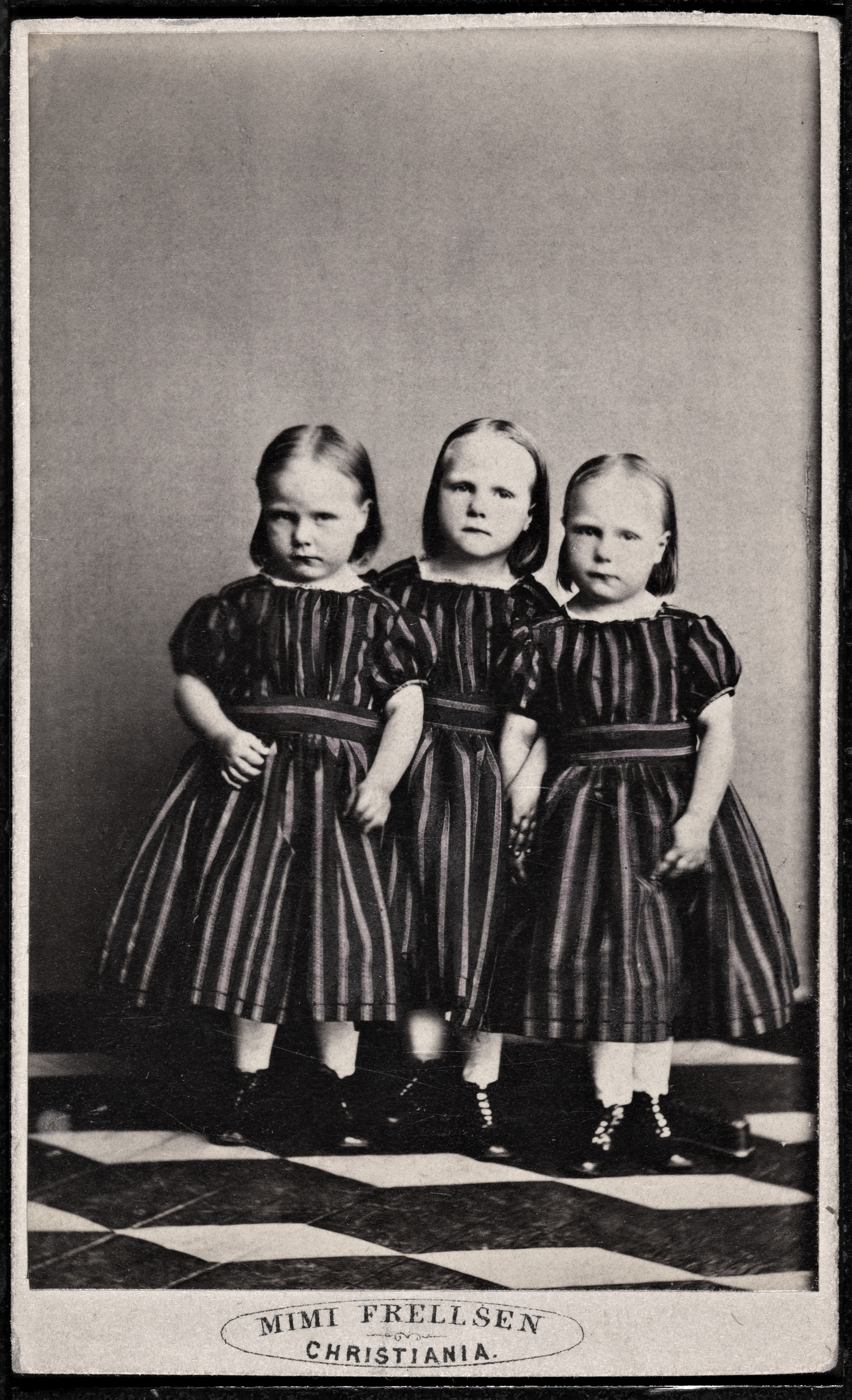
Tre små piker (Three little girls) by Mimi Frellsen

Mimi (Marie) Frellsen (1830–1914) was a pioneering Norwegian photographer who learnt the art in 1860. From 1865, she ran her own business in Christiania (now Oslo). Many of her portraits have been preserved.

== Biography ==
Born in Christiania on 4 January 1830, Maria Frellsen was the daughter of the physician Peter Frellsen and his wife Dorothea Cathrine Diricks. From the beginning of the 1860s, she served an apprenticeship in the photographic studio of Olsen & Thomsen in Christiania.

On 17 May 1865, she acquired the photo plate archive and studio on Oslo's Nedre Slottsgate which had belonged to the photographer Peter Marinus Thomsen. The following year, perhaps when business was not going too well, she announced she was interested in giving courses to those who wished to learn how to weave straw using the German method.

From around 1879, she moved her studio to the Oslo street called Grensen where she specialized in photographing children and animals. In 1881, the Church Ministry awarded her 300 crowns under the Cecilie Schous legacy so that she could acquire more equipment for her photographic studio.

As she grew older, she suffered increasingly from poor health. When she was 85, she died after an operation on 31 December 1914 and was cremated on 6 January 1915.
