= Moltke Moe =

Norwegian folklorist (1859-1913)

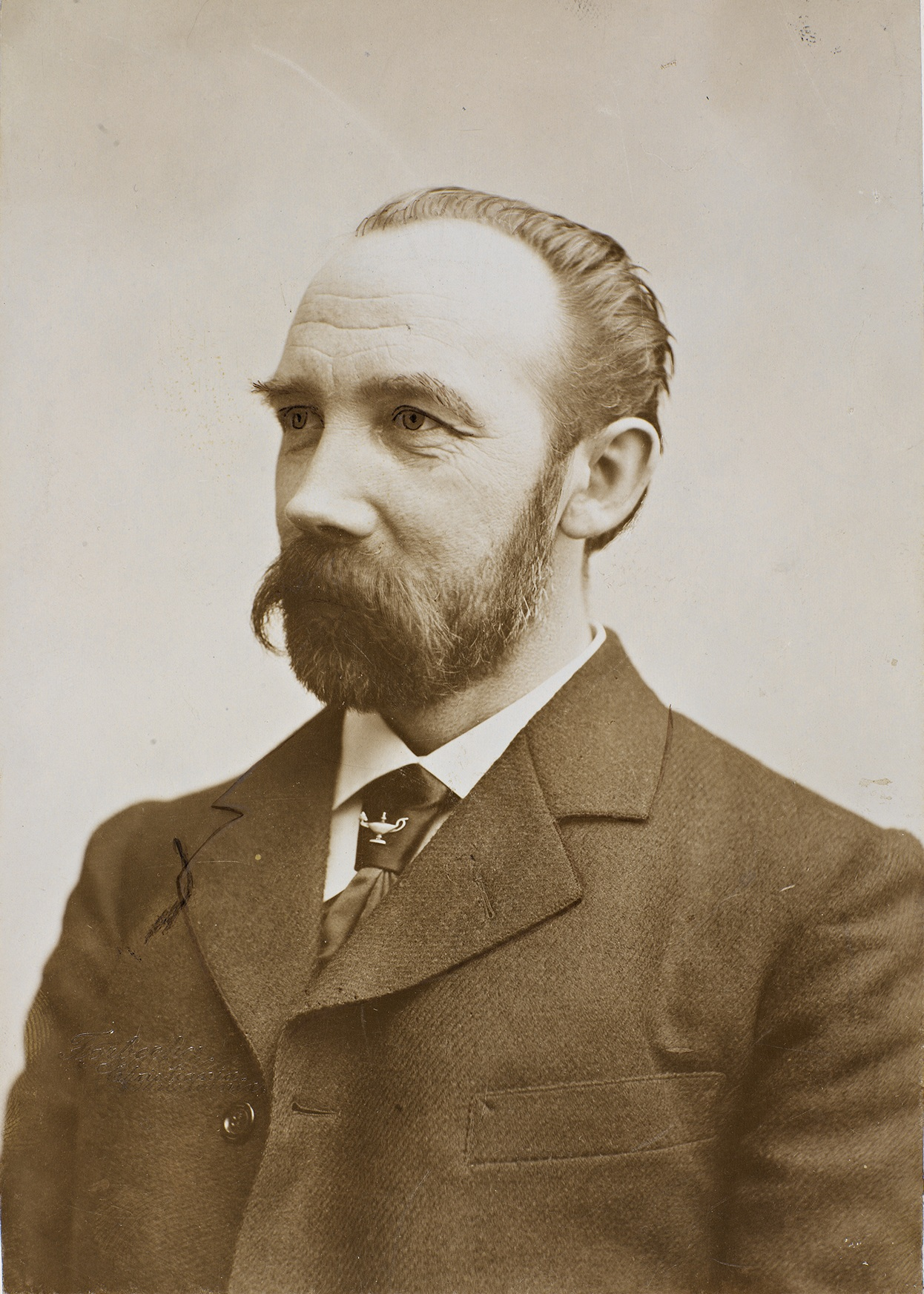
- Moltke Moe (date unknown)
- Born: 19 June 1859; Krødsherad, Norway
- Died: 15 December 1913 (aged 54)
- Occupation: folklorist
- Father: Jørgen Moe

Moltke Moe (19 June 1859 – 15 December 1913) was a Norwegian folklorist.

== Personal life ==
Ingebret Moltke Moe was born on 19 June 1859 in Krødsherad, Buskerud County, Norway. He was the son of Church of Norway Bishop Jørgen Moe.

== Career ==
After school graduation in 1876 he began to study theology, but eventually he was attracted more by folklore and religious history. From the time he was 18 years old, he collected folklore, particularly in Telemark.

Moe was a professor at the University of Christiania from 1886. Moltke Moe also took up the legacy established by his father and Peter Christen Asbjørnsen. He edited the collections of Norwegian folk tales in the tradition of Asbjørnsen and Moe. After his father's death in 1882, and following the death of Peter Christen Asbjørnsen in 1885, he took over the publication of the folktales. He sent out several revised editions. He also published collections of folk songs in cooperation with Knut Liestøl.

== Selected works ==
- Eventyrlige sagn i den ældre historie (1906)
- Folkeminne frå Bøherad (1925)
- Folke-eventyr frå Flatdal (1929)

== Other sources ==
- Flotra, Jorunn Moltke Moe som Folklorist (Aschehoug/Norsk Folkeminnelag; 1995)
