= Peter Marinus Thomsen =

Norwegian photographer (1832–1871)

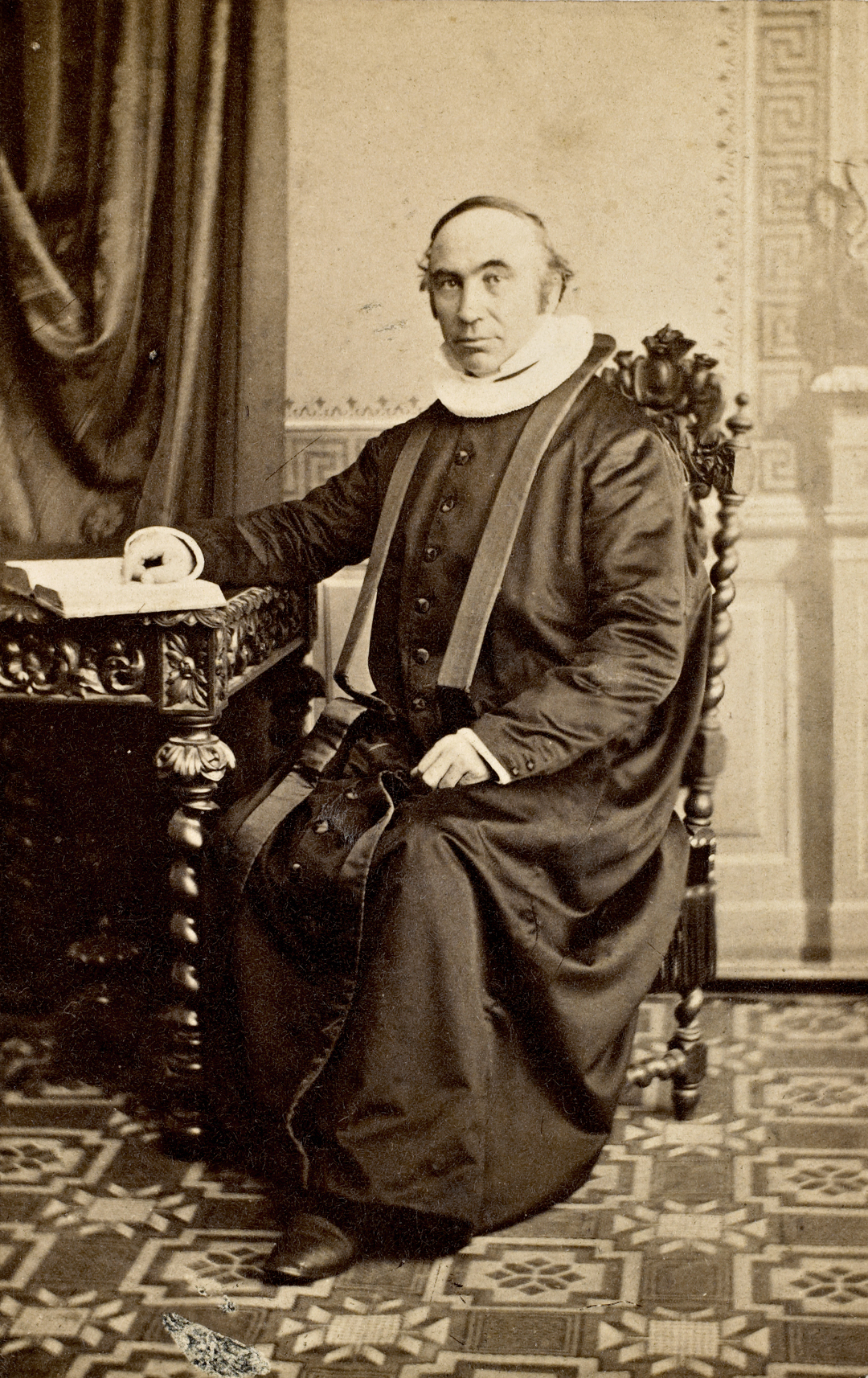
Portrait of Jørgen Moe by P. M. Thomsen (c. 1865)

Peter Marinus Thomsen (7 March 1832 – 30 March 1871) was a pioneering Norwegian photographer who, together with Christian Olsen (1813–1898) opened a photographic studio in Christiania (now Oslo) in May 1859. By 1865, he had dissolved his partnership with Olsen. That year he left his studio and his archives to Mimi Frellsen who had earlier served an apprenticeship with him.

Norwegian librarian and photo historian Susanne Bonge identified P.M. Thomsen as Marie Thomsen in her book Eldre norske fotografer; Fotografer og amatørfotografer i Norge frem til 1920 (Older Norwegian Photographers: Photographers and amateur photographers in Norway up to 1920) (1980). This was incorrect; we can with certainty link the photographer P.M. Thomsen to the merchant Peter Marinus Thomsen. This is possibly a confusion with the painter Marie Thomsen, a pupil of Christian Olsen, who in 1888 advertised that she produced oil portraits based on photographs.
