= Not a Pin to Choose Between Them =

Norwegian cultural lore

"Not a Pin to Choose Between Them" ("Somme kjerringer er slike", i.e. "Some womenfolk are like that") is a Norwegian folk tale about tolerating one's spouse despite his or her flaws. It is collected in Best-Loved Folktales of the World (1982).

It is also known as All women are alike, which appears in an index of folk tales under various names.

== Summary ==
"Not a Pin to Choose Between Them" is a story about a husband and a wife who try to trade some goods from their farm in town. First, the wife goes to town and loses her money and livestock (a hen and a cow). At home, the husband calls her "mad" ("gal", i.e. crazy or mentally disturbed) and says that he is going to find three others just as mad as her.

The first woman he finds tries to obtain light within her home. She offers him $300 to place windows in her home. The second woman asks for him to make hole in her husband's shirt to allow his neck through. He asks for a pair of scissors and $300 and does as she asks and he obtains his money. The third woman mishears him, believing that he is from Paradise, and she believes that he knows her late husband. So she gives him a chest full of dollars, a cart full of clothes, and two horses.

When he returns home, he finds his fields are plowed and sown; however, his wife had sown salt into the fields. "'Mad you are'; said her husband, 'and mad you will be so long as you live; but that is all one now, for the rest are not a bit wiser than you. There is not a pin to choose between you.'" The adventure teaches the husband that his wife is not the only woman out there lacking sense.
