= Doctor Know-all =

German fairy tale

Folk tale
- Name: Doctor Know-all
- Aarne–Thompson grouping: ATU 1641
- Country: Germany
- Published in: Grimms' Fairy Tales

"Doctor Know-all" (German: Doktor Allwissend) is a German fairy tale collected by the Brothers Grimm, tale number 98 in Grimms' Fairy Tales. It has an ATU index of 1641. Another tale of this type is Almondseed and Almondella.

== Analysis ==
The folktale is widespread "throughout Europe, India, Asia, some parts of Africa" and in the Americas.

Commenting on the tale repertoire of female storyteller Argyro, a Greek refugee from Asia Minor, Greek scholar Marianthi Kaplanoglou stated that she knew a story of the tale type ATU 1641, a "common" type to both "the Greek and Turkish corpora".

German scholar Ulrich Marzolph, in his catalogue of Persian folktales, listed 10 variants of the tale type across Persian sources, with the title Der falsche Wahrsager ("The False Soothsayer").

According to Professor Bronislava Kerbelytė, the tale type is reported to register 229 Lithuanian variants, under the banner Doctor Know-All.
