= The Prince and the Princess in the Forest =

Danish fairy tale

"The Prince and the Princess in the Forest" is a Danish fairy tale collected by Evald Tang Kristensen (1843–1929) in Æventyr fra Jylland (Danish, "Tales from Jutland") in 1881. Andrew Lang included it in his The Olive Fairy Book (1907).

== Synopsis ==
After the king of Denmark dies, the queen is so inconsolable that her only child, the prince, suggests that they should go to a place on the other side of a forest. They become lost in the woods, but come upon two houses, the first containing a mail shirt and a sword, with a note that said they would keep a man safe from all danger, which the prince, unbeknownst to his mother, takes. The second house contains food and a bed (granting them both food and a place to sleep), but unfortunately it is a robber's den, and the next morning, when the prince is off hunting for the path, the queen is surprised by the robber chief, who tells her that if she wants to live, she must make him king in her husband's place and must kill her son. When the queen protests that she cannot do this, the robber chief tells her to pretend to be ill and send her son to get her some apples from a forest a mile away, knowing that the forest "was full of wild animals who would tear to pieces any traveller who entered it."

What happens next depends on the version of the story. One version says that the prince fights the forest creatures and wins; Lang's version, however, states that the forest "was full of lions and tigers, and bears and wolves, who came rushing towards him; but instead of springing on him and tearing him to pieces, they lay down on the ground and licked his hands." Once the creatures are no longer a threat, the prince finds the apple tree; when his sword brushes against it, two apples fall. After taking the apples, he starts to leave the wood, but a little black dog leads him to a tiny hole in the hill, which the sword enlarges enough for the prince to enter. A princess of Arabia is chained to an iron pillar within; twelve robbers had captured her and were fighting over who would marry her. She further says that she had been imprisoned there for twenty years. A touch of the prince's sword breaks the chain, and he leads her through the forest to a port containing a ship bound for Arabia, pledging that if he is still alive the following year, he will come to Arabia and wed her. She gives him a ring as a pledge of their promise, and sails home.

The robber smells the apples while the prince is still far away and, deciding that only powerful magic could have saved the prince from the animals, orders the queen to tell the prince that she had dreamed that he had been attacked by wild animals and to ask how he'd survived. The prince tells her about the magic mail shirt and magic sword, which the queen then tells the robber chief, who makes a sleeping draught for the prince and steals the sword and mail shirt, claiming they are his brother's.

When he awakens, the robber gives him a choice: either die or be blinded and left in the forest. The prince, aware that his mother has betrayed him, chooses blindness. The robber and queen go back to Denmark, where they marry and the robber becomes king.

The prince wanders until he arrives at the port, where there is a ship bound for Arabia. The captain, pitying the blind man, offers to take him to Arabia. Once there, the prince goes to the public baths, where the ring slips from his fingers; a slave finds it and brings it to a friend of his who lives in the palace, who recognizes it as the princess's ring. The friend passes it on to his daughter, who is the princess's favorite servant. The princess, on seeing it, identifies it as the ring of her betrothed, and, despite the objections of her father, who does not feel that a blind man can rule after him, the princess and the prince are married.

One day, the prince overhears two ravens saying that the dew that falls in a certain part of the garden on Midsummer's Eve restores sight to those with bad eyes, or even no eyes at all. The prince tries it, and finds, to his delight and that of the princess, that he can see once more.

As the princess falls asleep due to the heat, the prince sees, about her neck, a small shining lamp on a chain. The prince unfastens the chain to examine the lamp, but drops the lamp pendant, which is instantly snatched up by a hawk. The prince chases the hawk for so long that he ends up in the same woods as before. When the princess wakes, she follows him and is captured by the same robbers.

The prince finds twelve youths seeking service. He joins them, and they all go to work for a troll, who tells them they have to care for his house for a year and then answer three questions. Those who succeed will receive a sack of gold; those who fail will be turned into beasts.

After a year, the prince heard the troll talking with another troll, saying he would ask how long they had been there (the twelve young men having been so busy partying that the troll was certain they did not know a year had passed), what shone on the roof (the lamp that the troll had stolen from the princess as she slept), and where their food came from (the king's table). When the troll asked these questions, the others did not know, but the prince answered all the questions correctly, so they all received their gold and left. On the way, they met an old beggar who asked for a piece of money for a poor man; the prince gave him his whole sackful. It was the troll in disguise, and he gave the prince the lamp he had stolen, telling him that the princess was in the same cave where the prince had first found her.

The prince disguises himself as a peddler and then orders a great many pots and pans from a goldsmith, using them to distract his mother with while he searches for and then reclaims the sword and mail shirt. When the robber chief returns, the prince strips him of his fine clothes and sends him into the forest, "where the wild beasts tore him to pieces," and sends his mother back to her own country. He rescues his wife and they reign, for a long, long time, over both her country and his.

== See also ==
- The Blue Belt
- The Three Princes and their Beasts
- True and Untrue
- The Grateful Beasts
- The Dragon and his Grandmother
- The Story of Zoulvisia
