= George Webbe Dasent =

British translator (1817–1896)

Sir George Webbe Dasent, D. C. L. (1817–1896) was a British lawyer, translator of folk tales and contributor to The Times.

== Life ==
Dasent was born 22 May 1817 at St. Vincent, British West Indies, the son of the attorney general, John Roche Dasent. His mother was the second wife of his father; Charlotte Martha was the daughter of Captain Alexander Burrowes Irwin.

He was educated at Westminster School, King's College London, and Oxford University, where he befriended classmate J.T. Delane. After graduating from university in 1840 with a degree in Classical literature, he was appointed secretary to Thomas Cartwright on a diplomatic post in Stockholm, Sweden. There he met Jakob Grimm, at whose recommendation he first became interested in Scandinavian literature and Norse mythology. He published the first result of his studies, an English translation of The Prose or Younger Edda (1842), followed by a translation of Rasmus Christian Rask's Grammar of the Icelandic or Old-Norse Tongue (1843).

Returning to England in 1845, he became assistant editor of The Times under his schoolmate Delane, whose sister, Frances Louisa, he married in 1846. Dasent's connections to Prussian diplomat Christian Charles Josias von Bunsen has been credited with significantly contributing the paper developing its foreign policy. While working for the newspaper, Dasent still continued his Scandinavian studies, publishing translations of various Norse stories. He also read for the Bar and was called in 1852 by the Middle Temple, and was admitted to Doctors' Commons as an advocate the same year.

In 1853, he was appointed professor of English literature and modern history at King's College London. In 1859 he published Popular Tales from the Norse, his translation of Norwegian Folktales (Norske Folkeeventyr) collected by Peter Christen Asbjørnsen and Jørgen Moe, including in it an "Introductory Essay on the Origin and Diffusion of Popular Tales."

Perhaps his best-known work, The Story of Burnt Njal, a translation of the Icelandic Njal's Saga that he had first attempted while in Stockholm, was issued in 1861. This work established sustained interest in Icelandic literature, so that more translations would follow. Dasent made a visit during 1861-1862 to Iceland, where he was hailed in Reykjavík as one of the saga lovers who had strengthened ties between the English and Norse. Subsequent to that visit, he published his translation of Gisli the Outlaw (1866).

In 1870, he was appointed a civil service commissioner and consequently resigned his post at The Times. In 1876 he was knighted in England, though he was already a Danish knight.

Dasent retired from the public service in 1892 and died at Ascot on 11 June 1896. He was survived by his wife, two sons, and a daughter, Frances Emily Mary (born 1855). The younger son was the writer and civil servant Arthur Irwin Dasent, and the elder son was Sir John Roche Dasent. Another son, George William Manuel Dasent (1849–1872), drowned near Sandford-on-Thames.

He also wrote “The Vikings of the Baltic” in 1875, a novel set during the Viking Age.

== Influence ==
- J. R. R. Tolkien cites Dasent's story 'Soria Moria Castle' as a possible name-source for the Mines of Moria.
- Tolkien also adapted Dasent's image of 'the bones and the soup' to argue against neglecting stories for source studies: "By 'the soup' I mean the story as it is served up by the author or teller, and by 'the bones' its sources or material".

== Notes ==
Government offices
| Preceded by The Earl of Strafford | First Civil Service Commissioner; 1888–1892 | Succeeded by William John Courthope |
