= Jørgen Moe =

Norwegian folklorist, poet and bishop (1813–1882)

Right Reverend Jørgen Engebretsen Moe
- Bishop of Kristianssand
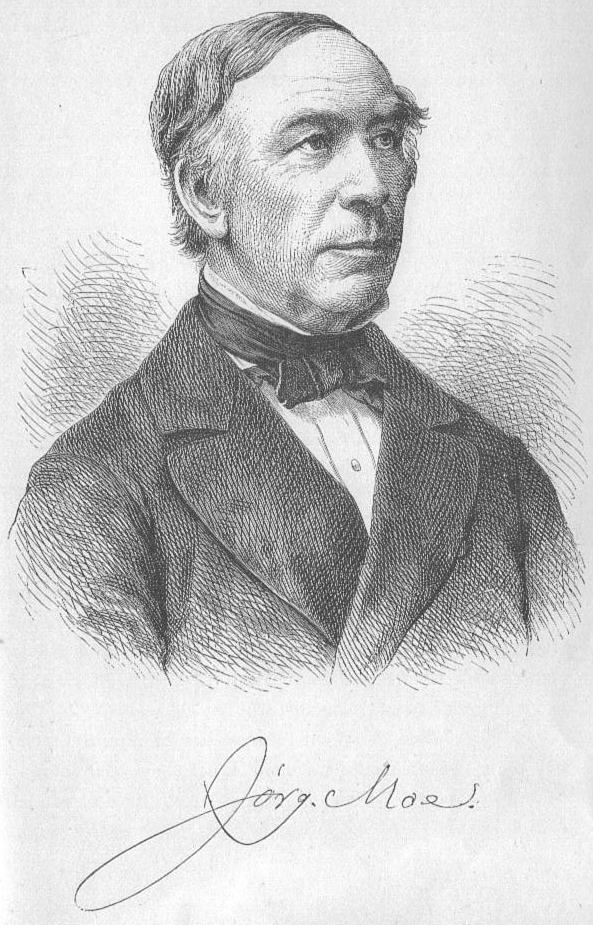
- Jørgen Moe by Adolf Closs
- Church: Church of Norway
- Diocese: Diocese of Kristianssand
- Appointed: 1874
- In office: 1874–1882

Personal details
- Born: 22 April 1813 Hole, Denmark-Norway
- Died: 27 March 1882 (aged 68) Kristiansand, Norway
- Buried: Vestre Aker Church graveyard, Kristiania
- Denomination: Christian
- Parents: Engebret Olsen Moe and Marthe Jørgensdatter
- Spouse: Johanne Fredrikke Sophie Sørenssen
- Children: Moltke Moe
- Occupation: Priest

Jørgen Engebretsen Moe (22 April 1813–27 March 1882) was a Norwegian folklorist, bishop, poet, and author. He is best known for the Norske Folkeeventyr, a collection of Norwegian folk tales which he edited in collaboration with Peter Christen Asbjørnsen. He also served as the Bishop of the Diocese of Kristianssand from 1874 until his death in 1882.

== Biography ==
Jørgen Engebretsen Moe was born at the farm of Øvre Moe in the municipality of Hole in the traditional district of Ringerike. He was the son of local farmer and politician Engebret Olsen Moe. He first met Asbjørnsen while the two were preparing for exams at Norderhov Rectory and soon found they had a shared interest in folklore.

Starting in 1841, Moe traveled almost every summer through the southern parts of Norway, collecting traditions and stories from the people living in the mountainous areas. In 1845, he was appointed professor of theology in the Norwegian Military Academy. However, Moe had long intended to take holy orders, and in 1853 he did so. He became a resident chaplain in Krødsherad at Olberg Church and Holmen Church in Sigdal, positions that he held for 10 years.

At his first parish he found inspiration for many of his most famous poems, like den gamle Mester (The Old Master) and Sæterjentens Søndag (Sunday at the Mountain Pastures). In 1863, he moved to Drammen and became parish priest of Bragernes Church, then in 1870 he moved again to Vestre Aker, close to Christiania (now Oslo). In 1874, he became bishop in the Diocese of Kristianssand based at the Kristiansand Cathedral, a position he held from 1874 until his death in 1882. He was a much beloved bishop, and his teaching had a great impact on his contemporaries.

Moe has a special claim on critical attention in regard to his lyrical poems, of which a small collection appeared in 1850. Moe felt strongly that writing should be "objective," in the sense that it removed the ego from the narrative. Still, he strove to build and maintain a literary aesthetic in his work. He wrote little original verse, but in his slender volume are to be found many pieces of exquisite delicacy and freshness. Moe also published a delightful collection of prose stories for children, I Brønden og i Tjernet (In the Well and in the Tarn), 1851; and En liden Julegave (A Little Christmas Present), 1860. Asbjørnsen and Moe had the advantage of an admirable style of narrative prose. It was usual that the vigor came from Asbjørnsen and the charm from Moe, but it seems that from the long habit of writing in unison they had come to adopt almost precisely identical modes of literary expression.

Moe was appointed Knight of the Order of St. Olav in 1873 and was made commander of the 1st cross class in 1881. During January 1882, he resigned his diocese due to failing health, and died the following March. His son, Moltke Moe, continued his father's work in folklore and fairy tales and became the first professor of the subject at Christiania University.

== Impact on Norwegian culture ==
Together with Peter Christen Asbjørnsen, the impact of Jørgen Moe on Norwegian culture was enormous. To Norwegians, the names Asbjørnsen and Moe have become synonymous with traditional folk tales, the way the name Brothers Grimm is associated with German tales. Not only did they collect and secure parts of the wealth of Norwegian fairy tales and edit them for common readers, but in doing this, they also contributed to the development of the Norwegian language.

The folk literature collected by Peter Christen Asbjørnsen and Jørgen Moe is widely regarded in Norway as a significant contribution to the country's national identity. Askeladden (Ash Boy), a character whose creativity and resourcefulness always win him the Princess and half the Kingdom, is seen as something typically Norwegian. Some of Moe's works of poetry are still cherished, not least because of the tunes set to them. His achievements in the Church are now mostly forgotten, except locally.

== Ringerikes Museum ==
Ringerikes Museum is the regional museum for the municipalities of Hole and Ringerike in Buskerud county. Ringerikes Museum is located in Hønefoss at the site of the former Norderhov rectory where Asbjørnsen and Moe first met. It is now the local museum for the Ringerike region and contains a collection of Asbjørnsen and Moe memorabilia. The museum is also noted for its collection of the private belongings of Jørgen Moe. In the 1930s, Marie Moe, Jørgen Moe's daughter, provided a gift consisting of several hundred objects from Jorgen Moe's private home.

== Major works ==
- Samling af Sange, Folkeviser og Stev i norske Allmuedialekter, 1840; enlarged edition, 1869, with melodies by Lindeman
- Norske folkeeventyr, 1841–1852 (with Asbjørnsen); expanded version 1882; English version by George Webbe Dasent, 1859
- Digte, 1849 (poems)
- I Brønden og i Kjærnet, 1851 (juvenile stories and sermons based on folk poems)
- At hænge på juletreet, 1855
- En liten julegave, 1860
- Samlede skrifter, 1877 (collected works, excepting the folk stories)

== Media gallery ==
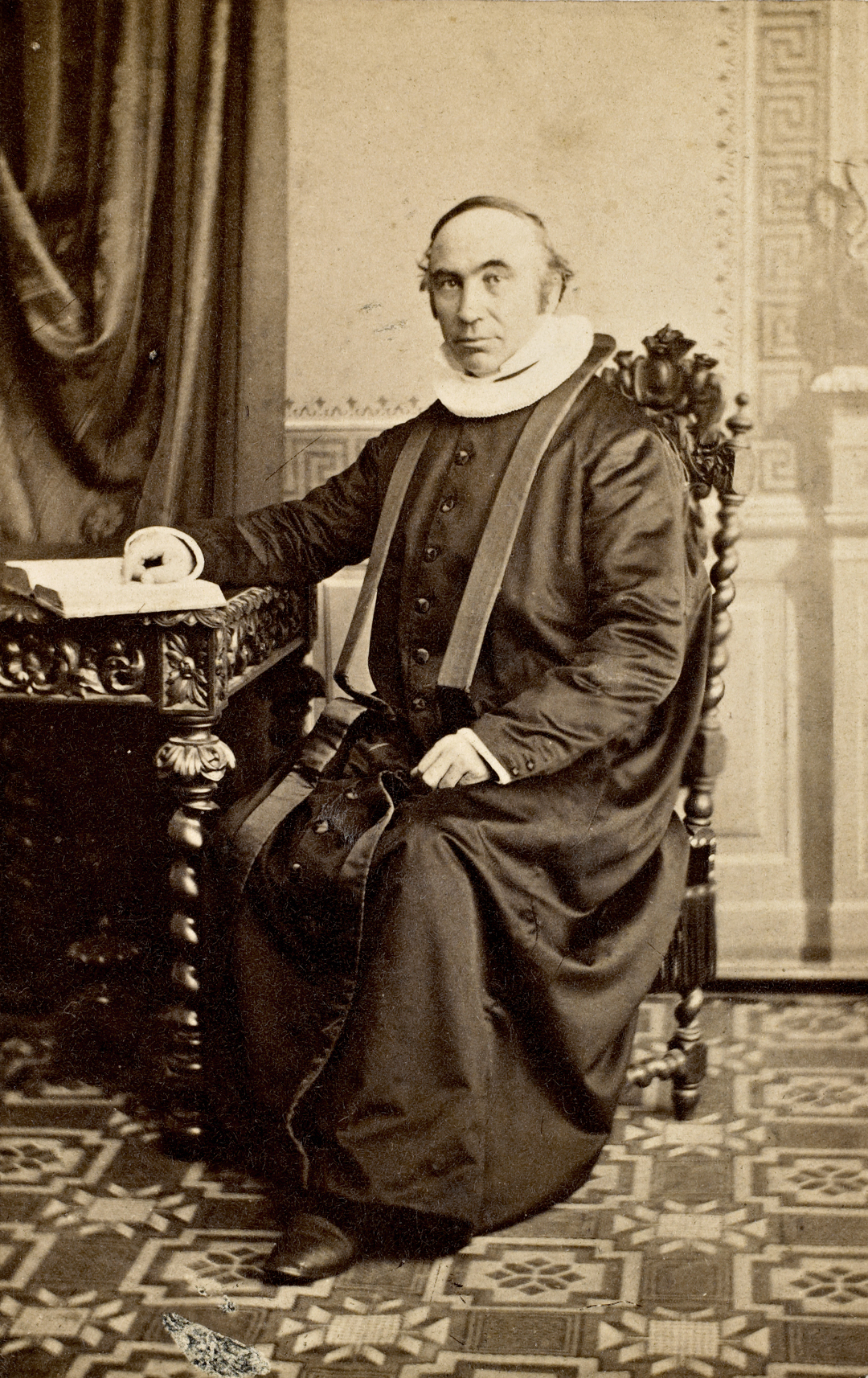
Photographed by Peter Marinus Thomsen (c.1865)

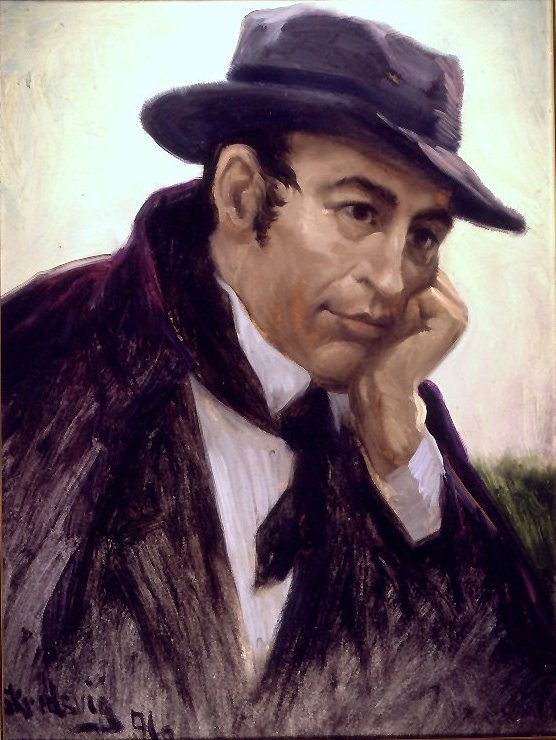
Jørgen Moe
painted by Christian Skredsvig (1896)

Norske Folkeeventyr
Asbjørnsen and Moe (1874)

Barne-eventyr
Asbjørnsen and Moe (1915)

== Sources ==
- Rines, George Edwin, ed. (1920). "Moe, Jörgen Ingebretsen" . Encyclopedia Americana.
- Hodne, Ørnulf (1979). Jørgen Moe og folkeeventyrene: En studie i nasjonalromantisk folkloristikk (in Norwegian). Universitetsforlaget.
- Halvorsen, J. B. (1896). Norsk Forfatter-Lexikon (in Norwegian). Vol. IV. Christiania.
- "Moe, Jörgen" . New International Encyclopedia. 1905.

Religious titles
Preceded by Jacob von der Lippe	Bishop of Christianssand; 1874–1882	Succeeded by Johan Jørgen Tandberg
