= Peter Christen Asbjørnsen =

19th-century Norwegian writer

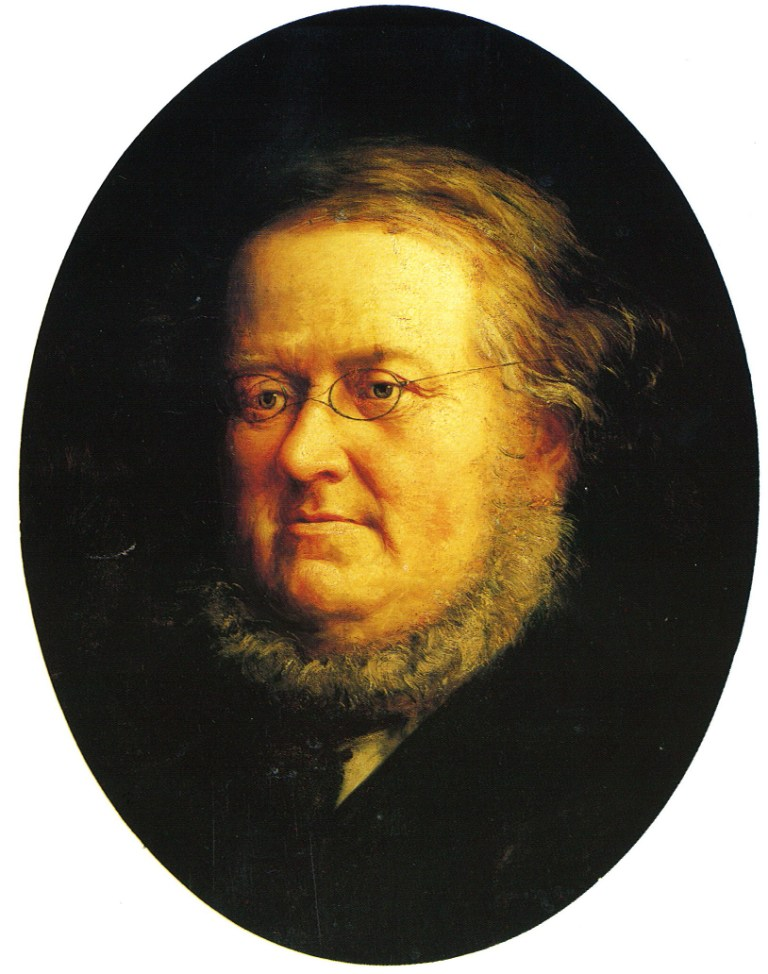
Portrait of Asbjørnsen by Knud Bergslien, 1870

Peter Christen Asbjørnsen (15 January 1812 – 5 January 1885) was a Norwegian writer and scholar. He and Jørgen Engebretsen Moe were collectors of Norwegian folklore. They were so closely united in their lives' work that their folk tale collections are commonly mentioned only as "Asbjørnsen and Moe".

== Background ==
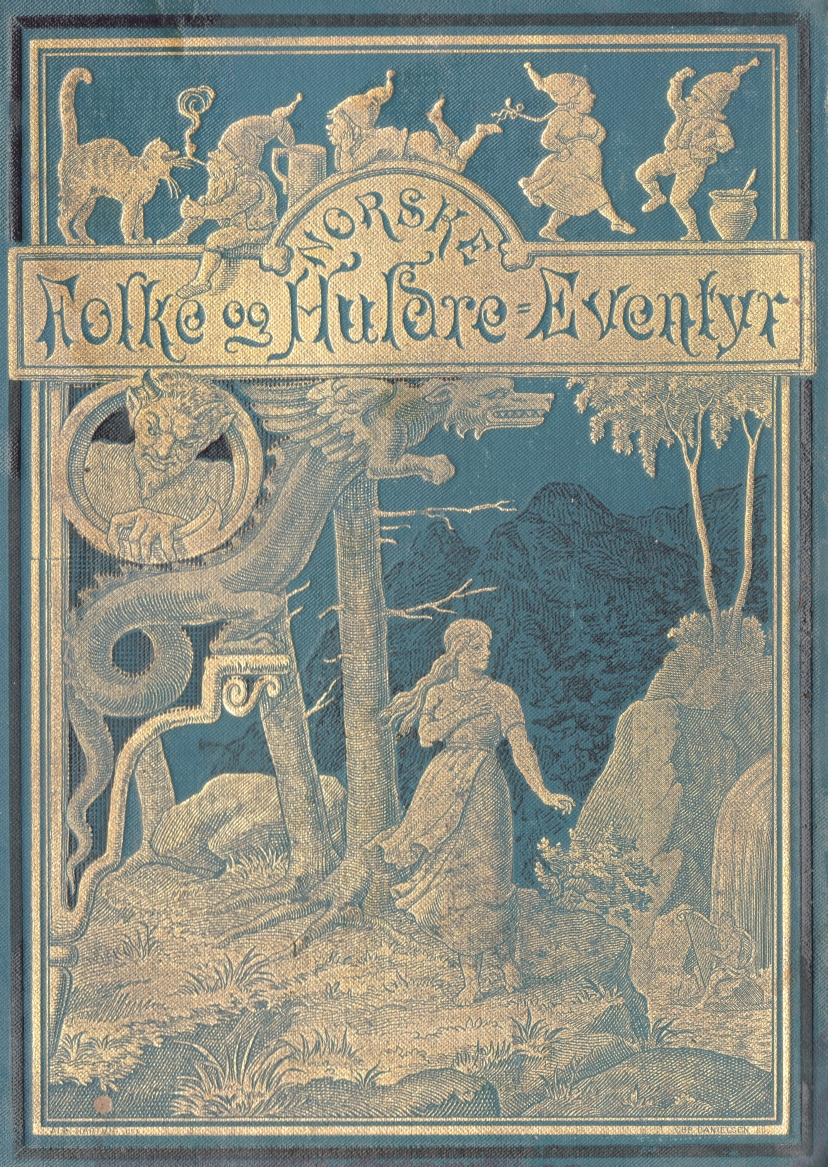
Norske folke- og huldreeventyr. Andet oplag (1896) (Gyldendalske Boghandels Forlag, Copenhagen)

Peter Christen Asbjørnsen was born in Christiania (now Oslo), Norway. He was descended from a family originating at Otta in the traditional district of Gudbrandsdal, which is believed to have come to an end with his death. He became a student at the University of Oslo in 1833, but as early as 1832, in his twentieth year, he had begun to collect and write down fairy tales and legends. He later walked on foot the length and breadth of Norway, adding to his stories.

Jørgen Moe, who was born in Ringerike, met Asbjørnsen first when he was fourteen years old, while they were both attending high school at Norderhov Rectory. The building today houses Ringerikes Museum, the local museum for the Ringerike region, and contains memorabilia from both Asbjørnsen and Moe. They developed a lifelong friendship. In 1834 Asbjørnsen discovered that Moe had started independently on a search for the relics of national folklore; the friends eagerly compared their results, and determined to work in concert in the future.

== Career ==
Asbjørnsen became by profession a zoologist, and with the aid of the University of Oslo made a series of investigative voyages along the coasts of Norway, particularly in the Hardangerfjord, during the 1840s and 1850s. He worked with two of the most famous marine biologists of their time: Michael Sars and his son Georg Ossian Sars. Moe, meanwhile, having left the University of Oslo in 1839, had devoted himself to the study of theology, and was making a living as a tutor in Christiania. In his holidays he wandered through the mountains, in the most remote districts, collecting stories. In these years he laid the foundation for the great literary its output.

In 1842–1843 the first instalment of Asbjørnsen and Moe's work appeared, under the title of Norske Folkeeventyr (Norwegian Folk Tales), which was received at once all over Europe as a most valuable contribution to comparative mythology as well as literature. A second volume was published in 1844 and a new collection in 1871. Many of the Folkeeventyr were translated into English by George Dasent in 1859.

In 1845 Asbjørnsen also published, without help from Moe, a collection of Norwegian fairy tales (Huldre-Eventyr og Folkesagn). He was awarded the gold Memoriæ Pignus medal from King Oscar I in recognition of his work on literature and folklore in 1848.

He also wrote popular science articles on Carl Linnaeus' work and Charles Darwin's theory of evolution. He named a new species of sea pen in 1851, and the sea star, Brisinga endecacnemos in 1856. He collected the Brisinga at a depth of 380 metres in Hardangerfjord using a tool he created, a bottom scraper. At this time of this discovery, it was not widely accepted that organism could live at that depth.

In 1856 Asbjørnsen called attention to the deforestation of Norway, and he induced the government to act on this issue. He attended the Royal Saxon Academy of Forestry and was appointed forest-master, and was sent through Norway to examine in various countries of the north of Europe the methods observed for the preservation of timber. He retired from these duties with a pension in 1876.

He was a member of The Society for Special, and in Particular Nationalistic Natural History in Dresden, The Saxon Society for the Preservation and Research of National Antiquities, The Society for German Cultural History in Weimar, The Research Society for Natural Science in Leipzig, a corresponding member of The Natural Science Society in Hamburg, and a member of The Imperial Royal Zoological and Botanical Society in Vienna. In 1876, he was appointed one of only 13 honorary member of the British Scandinavian Society.

In 1879 he sold his large collection of zoological specimens to the Natural History Museum in Ireland for £300. This collection includes specimens of Brisinga endecacnemos, possibly collected during his biological survey of the Hardangerfjord in the 1850s. He was made a member of the Royal Norwegian Society of Sciences in Trondheim in 1861. He died in Christiania in 1885.

== Writing style ==
It was usually said of their work that the vigour came from Asbjørnsen and the charm from Moe, but the fact seems to be that from the long habit of writing in unison they had come to adopt almost precisely identical modes of literary expression.

== Legacy ==
In the 20th century, Norwegian filmmaker Ivo Caprino made a series of puppet films based on the fairy tales of Asbjørnsen and Moe. Asbjørnsen is featured in the introduction to each film. Caprino also built a theme park in Hunderfossen Familiepark near Lillehammer where these fairy tales play a central role.

From 1996 to 2018, Asbjørnsen appeared on the reverse of the Series VII Norwegian 50 krone banknote.

A collection of almost 2000 letters received by Asbjørnsen are held in the National Library and Norwegian Folklore Archive, believed to be only a fraction of all the letters he received in his lifetime.

== Gallery ==
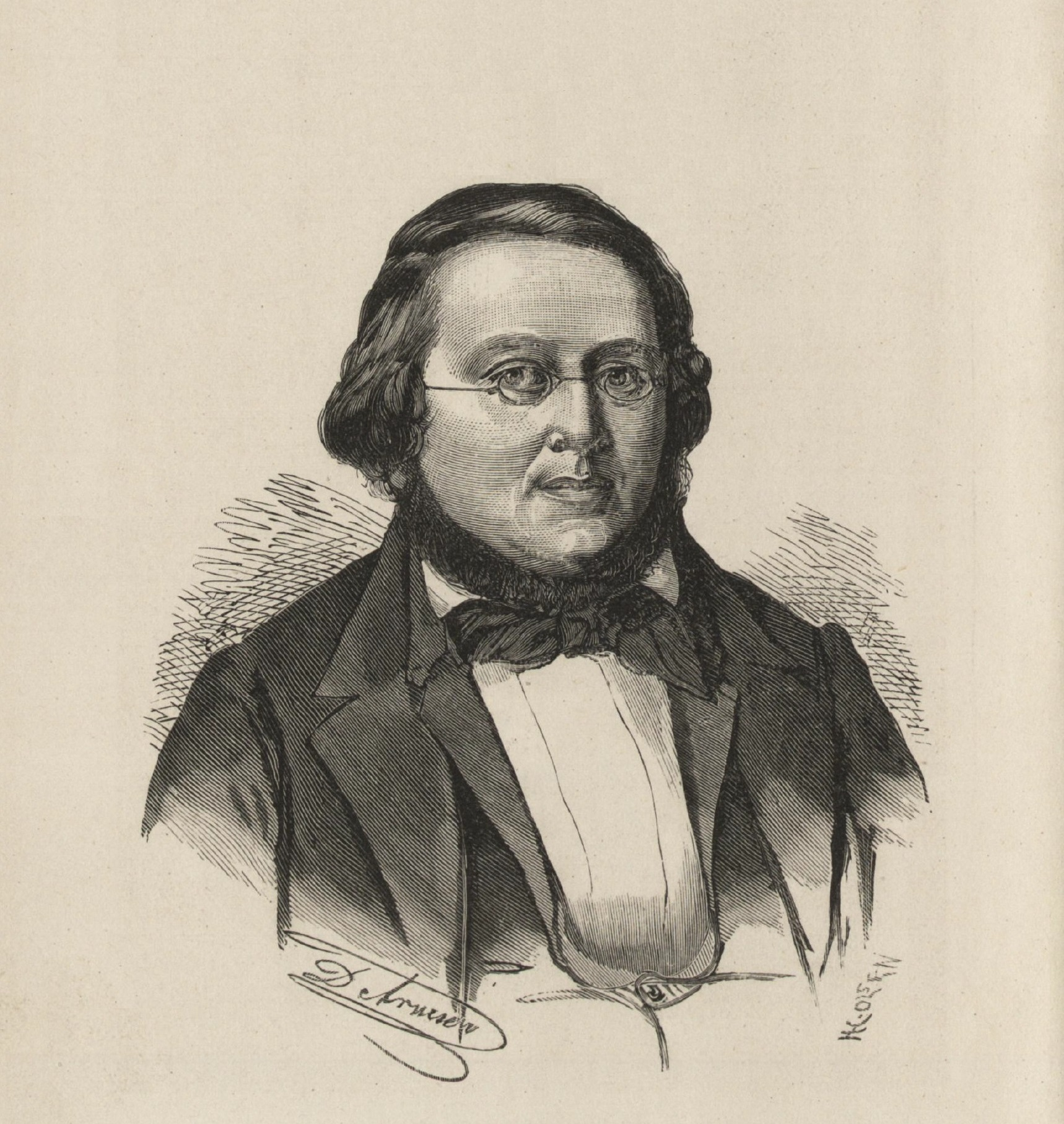
Xylography by Hans Christian Olsen after a drawn portrait by artist David Arnesen in 1842

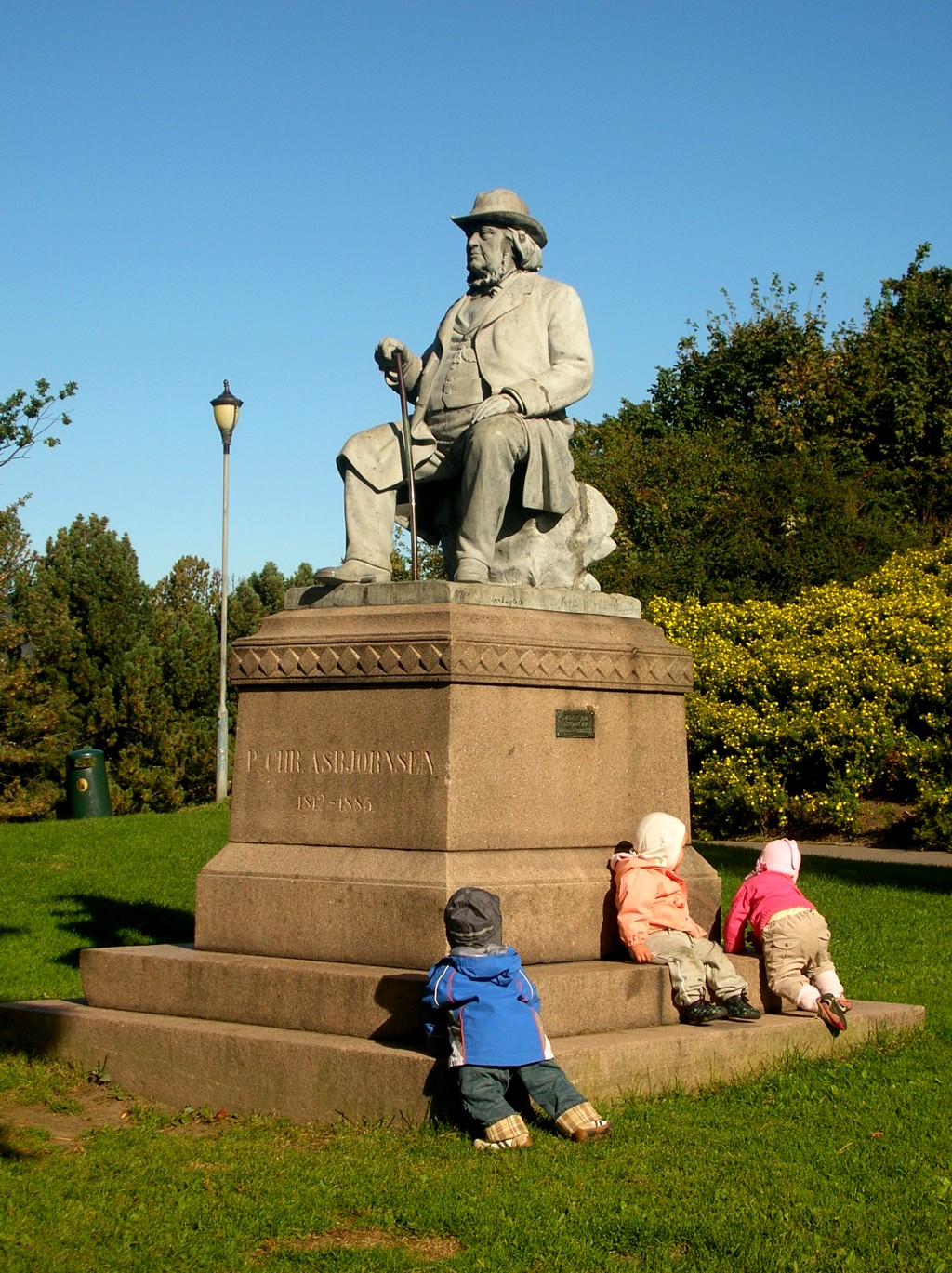

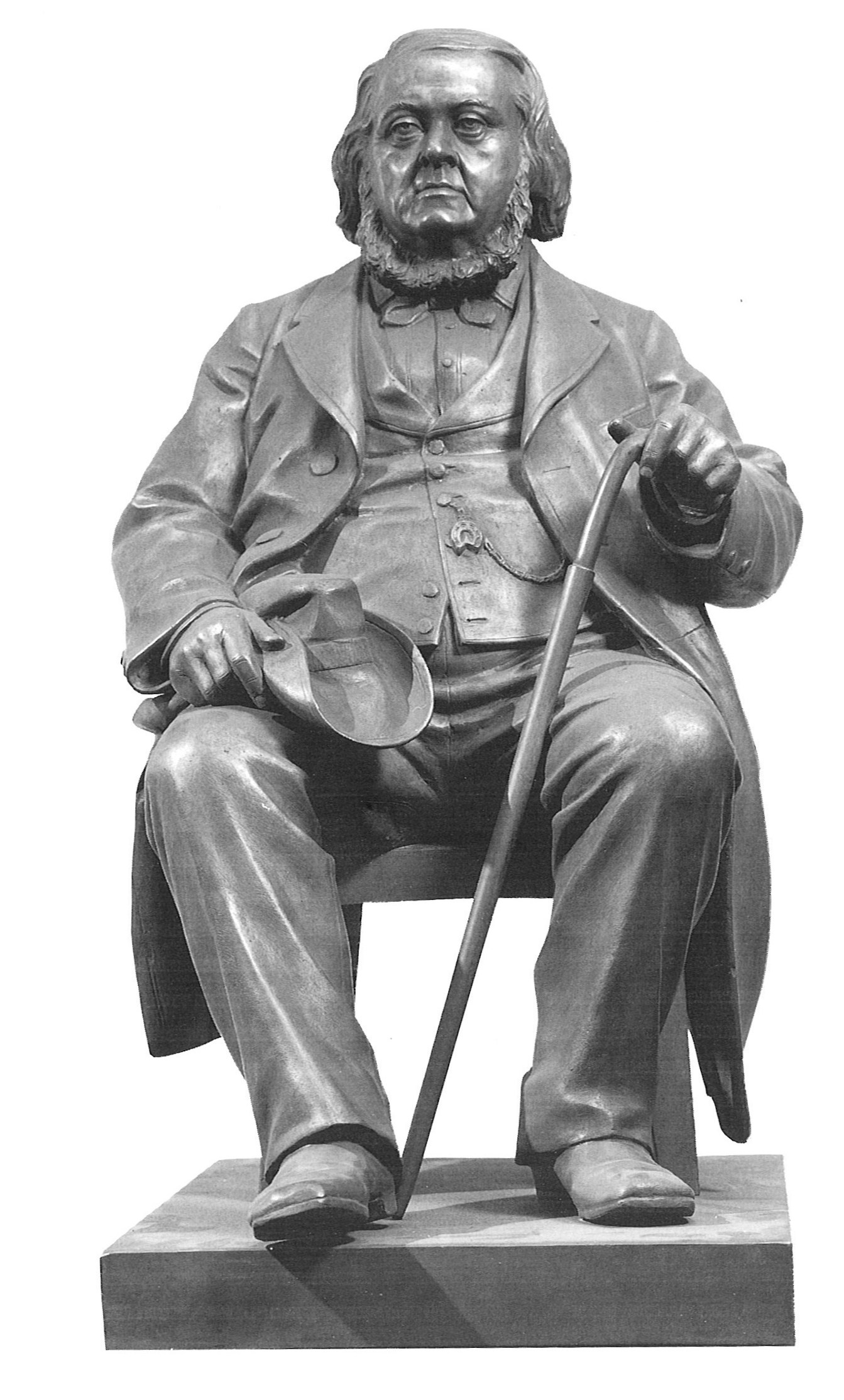

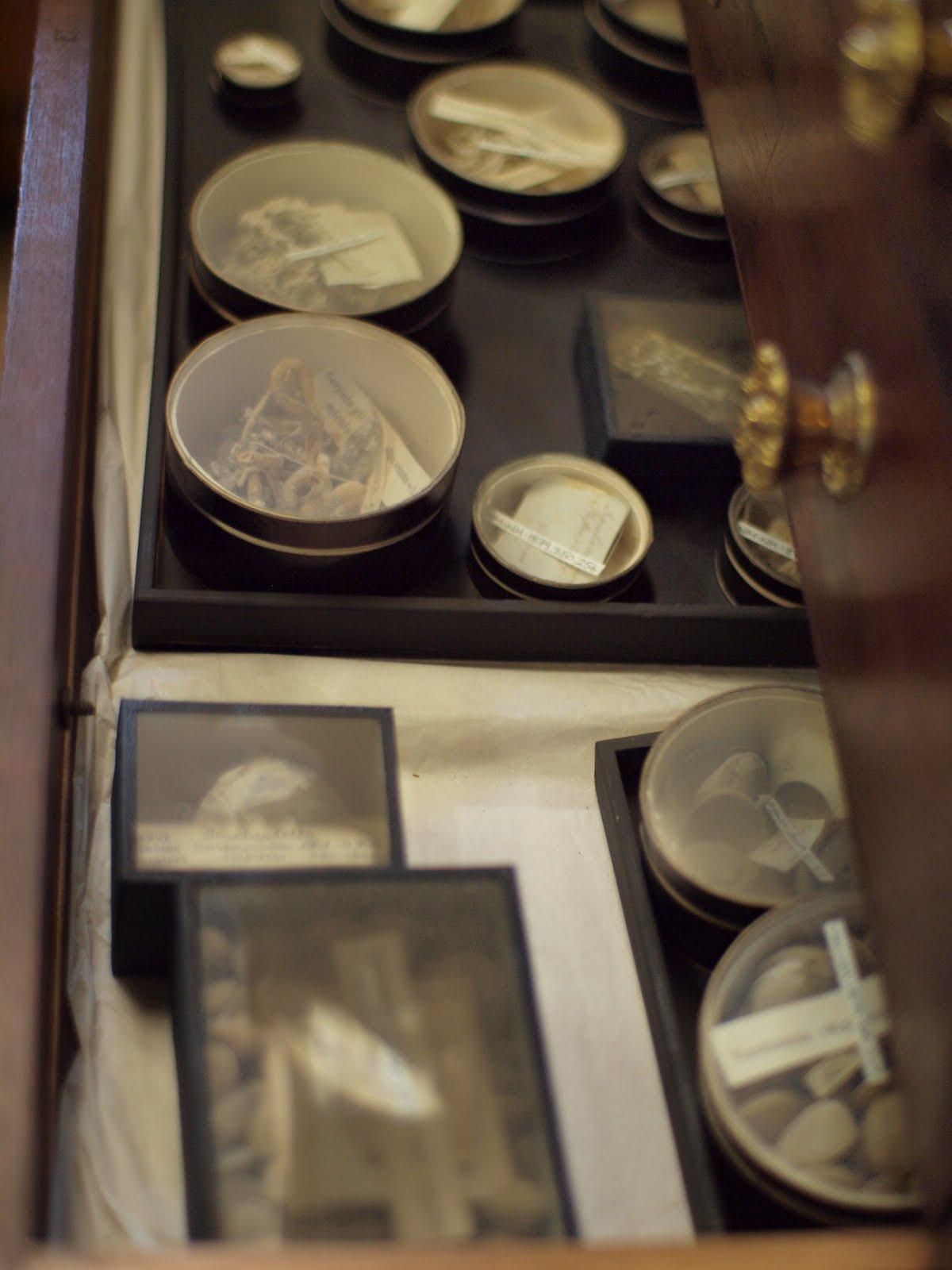
Specimens purchased from Asbjørnsen by the Natural History Museum, Dublin

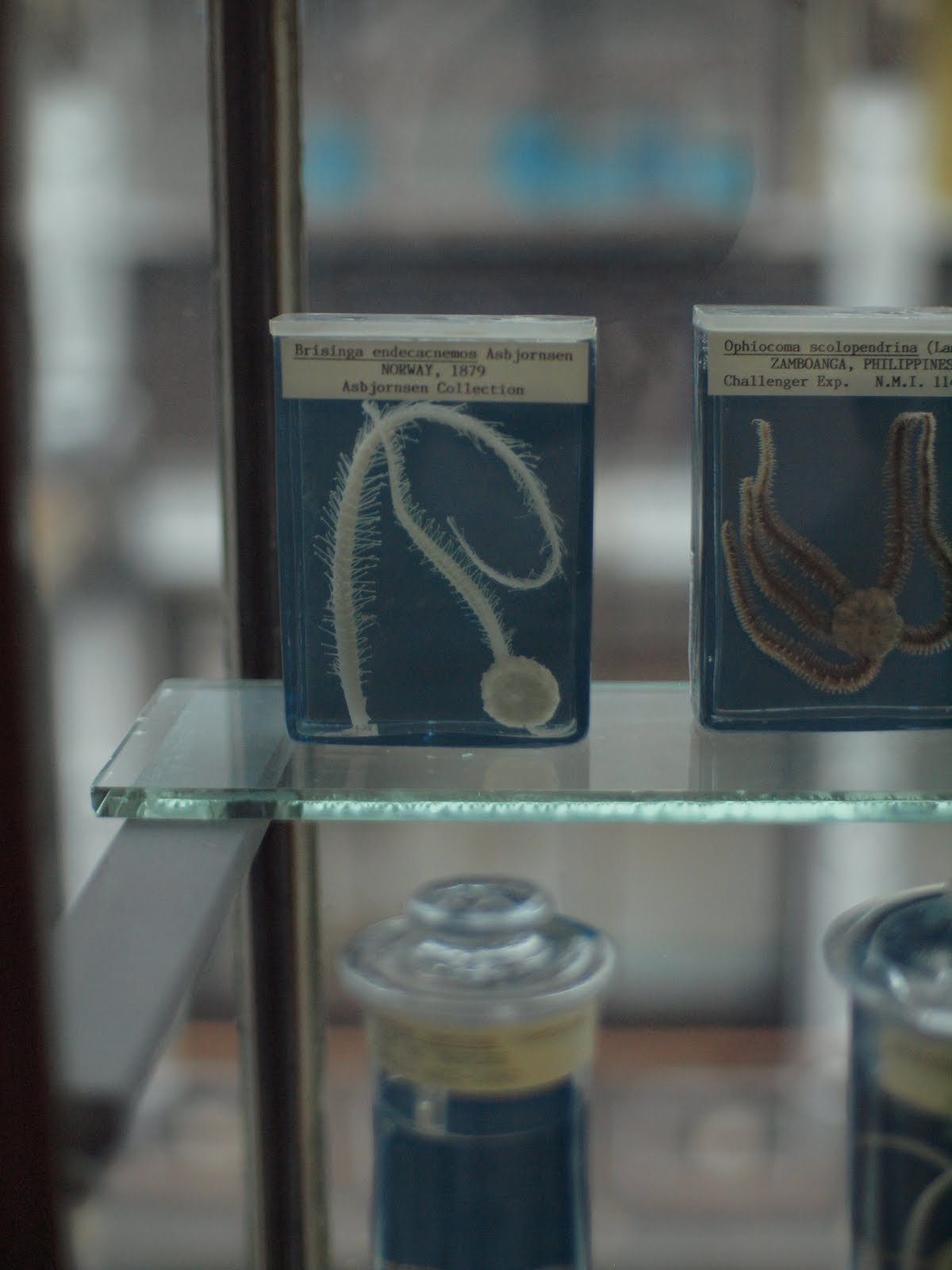
Specimen of Brisinga endecacnemos collected and named by Asbjørnsen, in the Natural History Museum, Dublin

== See also ==
- Storytelling

== Other sources ==
- Gjefsen, Truls Peter Christen Asbjørnsen – diger og folkesæl (Andresen & Butenschøn. Oslo: 2001)
- Liestøl, Knut P. Chr. Asbjørnsen. Mannen og livsverket. (Johan Grundt Tanum. Oslo: 1947)
