= Classics Illustrated Junior =

American comic book series

- Cover, issue 507

Publication information
- Publisher: Famous Authors, Ltd. Gilberton Publications
- Schedule: Monthly
- Format: Ongoing series
- Publication date: October 1953 — August 1962
- No. of issues: 77

Creative team
- Created by: Albert Lewis Kanter
- Artist(s): L.B. Cole; Kurt Schaffenberger; John Costanza; Alex Blum; Graham Ingels

Classics Illustrated Junior is a comic book series of seventy-seven fairy and folk tale, myth and legend comic book adaptations created by Albert Lewis Kanter as a spin-off of his flagship comic book line Classics Illustrated.

== Publication history ==
At its peak in 1960, Classics Illustrated Junior's average monthly circulation was 262,000.

In 2003, Jack Lake Productions Inc., based in Toronto, Canada began remastering and republishing the entire Classics Illustrated Junior series.

In September of 2008, Classic Comic Store Ltd., based in the UK, under license by Jack Lake Productions Inc. began publishing both the original Gilberton Classics Illustrated regular and Junior lines for distribution in the UK, Republic of Ireland, South Africa, Australia and New Zealand. The issue number sequence is different from the original runs, starting at issue 1 rather than at issue 501. The contents are generally similar to the original run, but the exterior of the back cover is used to advertise future issues, along with details of Classic Comic Store's website. The final page of the issue contains a brief biography of the author(s) of the main story written by William B. Jones, Jr, author of Classics Illustrated: A Cultural History

List of complete sequence

In common with the first-run series in America, the inside back cover contains an outline picture to colour in from the main story (although the first print run of Issues 1-4 used the American spelling color instead of the British spelling colour).

== Complete list of Classics Illustrated Junior comic books (original US run; also 2003-2014 Canadian run) ==
The Canadian run created by Jack Lake Productions Inc. which began in 2003 followed the same sequence as the original U.S. run.

The authorship is based on the information held by Michigan State University Libraries, Special Collections Division in their Reading Room Index to the Comic Art Collection, as well as information found on Wikipedia under the title of the individual stories.

Issue	Title	Author
501	Snow White and the Seven Dwarfs	Brothers Grimm
502	The Ugly Duckling	Hans Christian Andersen
503	Cinderella	Charles Perrault
504	The Pied Piper	Robert Browning
505	The Sleeping Beauty (also contains The Real Princess)	Charles Perrault/Brothers Grimm (The Real Princess: Hans Christian Andersen)
506	The 3 Little Pigs	Joseph Jacobs
507	Jack and the Beanstalk	William Godwin
508	Goldilocks and the Three Bears	Robert Southey
509	Beauty and the Beast	Credited to Charles Perrault, but other sources credit Gabrielle-Suzanne Barbot de Villeneuve
510	Little Red Riding Hood	Charles Perrault
511	Puss-In-Boots	Gianfrancesco Straparola/Charles Perrault
512	Rumplestiltskin	Brothers Grimm
513	Pinocchio	Carlo Collodi
514	The Steadfast Tin Soldier	Hans Christian Andersen
515	Johnny Appleseed	---
516	Aladdin and His Lamp	Brothers Grimm
517	The Emperor's New Clothes	Hans Christian Andersen
518	The Golden Goose	Brothers Grimm
519	Paul Bunyan	W.B. Laughead
520	Thumbelina	Hans Christian Andersen
521	The King of the Golden River	John Ruskin
522	The Nightingale	Hans Christian Andersen
523	The Gallant Tailor	Brothers Grimm
524	The Wild Swans	Hans Christian Andersen
525	The Little Mermaid	Hans Christian Andersen
526	The Frog Prince	Brothers Grimm
527	The Golden-Haired Giant	Brothers Grimm
528	The Penny Prince	Hans Christian Andersen
529	The Magic Servants	Brothers Grimm
530	The Golden Bird	Brothers Grimm
531	Rapunzel	Brothers Grimm
532	The Dancing Princesses	Brothers Grimm
533	The Magic Fountain	Brothers Grimm
534	The Golden Touch	Nathaniel Hawthorne
535	The Wizard of Oz	L. Frank Baum
536	The Chimney Sweep	Hans Christian Andersen
537	The Three Fairies	Giambattista Basile
538	Silly Hans	Hans Christian Andersen
539	The Enchanted Fish	Brothers Grimm
540	The Tinder-Box	Hans Christian Andersen
541	Snow White and Rose Red	Brothers Grimm
542	The Donkey's Tale	Brothers Grimm
543	The House in the Woods	Brothers Grimm
544	The Golden Fleece	---
545	The Glass Mountain	
546	The Elves and the Shoemaker	Brothers Grimm
547	The Wishing Table	Brothers Grimm
548	The Magic Pitcher	"Based on The Miraculous Pitcher by Nathaniel Hawthorne".
549	Simple Kate	---
550	The Singing Donkey	Brothers Grimm
551	The Queen Bee	Brothers Grimm
552	The Three Little Dwarfs	Brothers Grimm
553	King Thrushbeard	Brothers Grimm
554	The Enchanted Deer	Giambattista Basile
555	The 3 Golden Apples	Nathaniel Hawthorne
556	The Elf Mound	Hans Christian Andersen
557	Silly Willy	
558	The Magic Dish	---
559	The Japanese Lantern	---
560	The Doll Princess	---
561	Hans Humdrum	---
562	The Enchanted Pony	The Little Humpbacked Horse
563	The Wishing Well	---
564	The Salt Mountain	Russian folktale collected by Alexander Afanasyev
565	The Silly Princess	---
566	Clumsy Hans	Hans Christian Andersen
567	The Bearskin Soldier	Brothers Grimm
568	The Happy Hedgehog	Brothers Grimm
569	The Three Giants	---
570	The Pearl Princess	---
571	How Fire Came To The Indians	---
572	The Drummer Boy	---
573	The Crystal Ball	Brothers Grimm
574	Brightboots	---
575	The Fearless Prince	---
576	The Princess Who Saw Everything	---
577	The Runaway Dumpling	---

== List of Classics Illustrated Junior comic books (UK series from 2008) ==
Cover of "Jack and the Beanstalk" from the UK run.

Up until September 2009 (issue 12), the runs for both the US and the UK runs were identical, albeit with issue numbers starting at 1 for the UK version rather than at 501.

From issue 13 onwards, Classic Comic Store Ltd no longer published the titles (although still publishing the Classics Illustrated line), but imported the issues from Canada (where the series was already being published by Jack Lake Productions Inc.). These issues hence follow the Canadian numbering of the issues (513 onwards).

In October 2012 (when issue 544 had been despatched), Classic Comic Store Ltd no longer continued with a subscription service in the UK, because of the costs involved.

The authorship is based on the information found in the publications themselves, information held by Michigan State University Libraries, Special Collections Division in their Reading Room Index to the Comic Art Collection, as well as information found on Wikipedia under the title of the individual stories.

Issue	Publication Date	Title	Author	Extras	US issue
1	October 2008	Snow White and the Seven Dwarfs	Brothers Grimm	· The Farmer in the Dell	501
2	November 2008	The Ugly Duckling	Hans Christian Andersen	· The Cat and the Fiddle	502
3	December 2008	Cinderella	Charles Perrault	· Jack and Jill	503
4	January 2009	The Pied Piper	Robert Browning	· Sing a Song of Sixpence	504
5	February 2009	The Sleeping Beauty	Charles Perrault/Brothers Grimm	· The Real Princess by Hans Christian Andersen · Simple Simon	505
6	March 2009	The 3 Little Pigs	Joseph Jacobs	· I Saw a Ship A-sailing	506
7	April 2009	Jack and the Beanstalk	William Godwin	· My Shadow from A Child's Garden of Verses by Robert Louis Stevenson	507
8	May 2009	Goldilocks and the Three Bears	Robert Southey	· Foreign Lands from A Child's Garden of Verses by Robert Louis Stevenson	508
9	June 2009	Beauty and the Beast	Credited to Charles Perrault, but other sources credit Gabrielle-Suzanne Barbot de Villeneuve	· Aesop's Fables: The Dog and the Shadow · Ride A Cock-Horse	509
10	July 2009	Little Red Riding Hood	Charles Perrault	· Aesop's Fables: The Fox and the Grapes · Little Bo Peep	510
11	August 2009	Puss-In-Boots	Gianfrancesco Straparola/Charles Perrault	· Aesop's Fables: The Fox and the Stork · There was a Crooked Man · Peter Piper	511
12	September 2009	Rumplestiltskin	Brothers Grimm	· Aesop's Fables: The Miller, his Son and their Donkey · To market, to market · 3 Wise Men of Gotham	512
Canadian series imported into the UK:
513		Pinocchio	Carlo Collodi	· Aesop's Fables: The Ant and the Grasshopper · Pirate Story from A Child's Garden of Verses by Robert Louis Stevenson · The Animal World: The Grizzly Bear	
514		The Steadfast Tin Soldier	Hans Christian Andersen	· Aesop's Fables: The Actor and the Farmer · Young Night Thought from A Child's Garden of Verses by Robert Louis Stevenson · The Animal World: The Dingo	
515		Johnny Appleseed	---	· Pecos Bill (probably by Edward O'Reilly) · If All the Seas were One Sea (traditional Mother Goose tale) · The Animal World: The Kangaroo	
516		Aladdin and His Lamp	Brothers Grimm	· Aesop's Fables: The Boy and the Wolf · The Fat Man of Bombay from Book of Nonsense by Edward Lear · Wee Willie Winkie by William Miller · The Animal World: The Sperm Whale	
517		The Emperor's New Clothes	Hans Christian Andersen	· Aesop's Fables: The City Mouse and the Country Mouse · Peter, Peter · Baa, Baa, Black Sheep · The Swing from A Child's Garden of Verses by Robert Louis Stevenson	
518		The Golden Goose	Brothers Grimm	· Aesop's Fables: The Lion and the Mouse · Hark! Hark! · Humpty Dumpty · Rain/At the Seaside from A Child's Garden of Verses by Robert Louis Stevenson	
519		Paul Bunyan	W.B. Laughead	· Aesop's Fables: The Donkey and the Little Dog · Little Boy Blue · Where go the Boats? from A Child's Garden of Verses by Robert Louis Stevenson	
520		Thumbelina	Hans Christian Andersen	· Aesop's Fables: The Crow and the Pitcher · Bed in Summer from A Child's Garden of Verses by Robert Louis Stevenson · Cock Robin and Jenny Wren	
521		The King of the Golden River	John Ruskin	· Aesop's Fables: The Unhappy Crow · The Land of Nod from A Child's Garden of Verses by Robert Louis Stevenson · This is the Way	
522		The Nightingale	Hans Christian Andersen	· Aesop's Fables: The Hare and the Tortoise · The Moon from A Child's Garden of Verses by Robert Louis Stevenson · Mary Had a Little Lamb	
523		The Valiant Little Tailor	Brothers Grimm	· Aesop's Fables: The Fox and the Crow · Windy Nights from A Child's Garden of Verses by Robert Louis Stevenson · Wouldn't it be funny? · Jack Be Nimble	
524		The Wild Swans	Hans Christian Andersen	· Aesop's Fables: The Raven and the Swan · I Saw Three Ships come Sailing by · The Wind from A Child's Garden of Verses by Robert Louis Stevenson	
525		The Little Mermaid	Hans Christian Andersen	· Aesop's Fables: The Milkmaid and Her Pail · Ding, Dong, Bell! · A Cat Came Fiddling · The Animal World: The Raccoon	
526		The Frog Prince	Brothers Grimm	· Aesop's Fables: The Hares and the Frogs · Pussy Cat, Pussy Cat · What are Little Boys Made of? · The Animal World: The Condor	
527		The Golden-Haired Giant	Brothers Grimm	· Aesop's Fables: The Fox and the Goat · There was a Maid · The Animal World: The Moose	
528		The Penny Prince	Hans Christian Andersen	· Aesop's Fables: The Two Goats · Three Little Kittens · The Animal World: The Rabbit	
529		The Magic Servants	Brothers Grimm	· Aesop's Fables: The Wolf in Sheep's Clothing · Froggie Went A-Courtin' · The Animal World: The Tiger	
530		The Golden Bird	Brothers Grimm	· Aesop's Fables: The Wind and the Sun · London Bridge · The Animal World: The Seal	
531		Rapunzel	Brothers Grimm	· Aesop's Fables: The Mice in Council · Little Miss Muffet · The Animal World: The Reindeer	
532		The Dancing Princesses	Brothers Grimm	· Aesop's Fables: The Lark and her Young Ones · Little Jack Horner · The Animal World: The Porcupine	
533		The Mountain Fountain	---	· The Brothers Grimm: The Straw, the Coal and the Bean · Septimus Winner: Where, O Where · The Animal World: The Squirrel	
534		The Golden Touch	Nathaniel Hawthorne	· Aesop's Fables: Stone soup · Mistress Mary · The Animal World: The Turtle	
535		The Wizard of Oz	L. Frank Baum	· Aesop's Fables: The Fox and the Lion · Old Mother Hubbard · The Animal World: The Koala	
536		The Chimney Sweep	Hans Christian Andersen	· Aesop's Fables: The Fisherman and the Little Fish · Pat-a-Cake · The Animal World: The Beaver	
537		The Three Fairies	---	· Aesop's Fables: The Ant and the Dove · Rub-a-Dub-Dub · The Animal World: The Flamingo	
538		Silly Hans	Brothers Grimm	· Aesop's Fables: The Lion and the Dolphin · The North Wind · The Animal World: The Penguin	
539		The Enchanted Fish	Brothers Grimm	· Aesop's Fables: The Four Oxen and the Lion · The Queen of Hearts · The Animal World: The Armadillo	
540		The Tinder-Box	Hans Christian Andersen	· Aesop's Fables: The Lioness and her family · Hickety, Pickety · The Animal World: The Kinkajou	
541		Snow White and Rose Red	Brothers Grimm	· Aesop's Fables: The Rich Man's Guest · The Duck and the Kangaroo by Edward Lear · The Animal World: The Cougar	
542		The Donkey's Tale	Brothers Grimm	· Aesop's Fables: The Oak and the Reed · The Owl and the Pussycat by Edward Lear · The Animal World: The Flying Squirrel	
543		The House in the Woods	Brothers Grimm	· Aesop's Fables: The Treasure in the Vineyard · The Broom, the Shovel, the Poker and the Tongs by Edward Lear · The Animal World: Skunks	
544		The Golden Fleece - from Tanglewood Tales	Nathaniel Hawthorne	· Aesop's Fables: The Donkey and the Cricket · The Daddy Long-Legs and the Fly by Edward Lear · The Animal World: The Jaguar	
545		The Glass Mountain	No author attribution - ('Based on a Polish tale')	· Aesop's Fables: The Donkey and the Salt · There was an old man with a beard by Edward Lear · The Animal World: The Otter	
546		The Elves and the Shoemaker	Brothers Grimm	· Aesop's Fables: The Greedy Lion · There was an old lady of France by Edward Lear · The Animal World: The Heron	
547		The Wishing Table	Brothers Grimm	· Aesop's Fables: The Two Frogs · There was an old person of Brigg by Edward Lear · The Animal World: The Aardvark	
548		The Magic Pitcher	Based on The Miraculous Pitcher by Nathaniel Hawthorne	· Aesop's Fables: The Arab and his Camel · There was an old man who said, 'Hush!' by Edward Lear · The Animal World: The Aligator	
549		Simple Kate	Brothers Grimm	· Aesop's Fables: The Spendthrift and the Swallow · There was a young lady of Welling by Edward Lear · The Animal World: The Albatross	
550		The Singing Donkey	Brothers Grimm	· Aesop's Fables: The Fortune Teller · There was an Old man who said, "Well!" by Edward Lear · The Animal World: The Caribou	
551		The Queen Bee	Brothers Grimm	· Aesop's Fables: The Plane Tree · There was an Old man of Kilkenny by Edward Lear · The Animal World: The Puma	
552		The Three Little Dwarfs	Brothers Grimm	· Aesop's Fables: The Woodcutters and the Ax · There was an Old man of the West by Edward Lear · The Animal World: The Salamander	
553		King Thrushbeard	Brothers Grimm	· Aesop's Fables: The Man and the Satyr · There was an Old man in a Boat by Edward Lear · The Animal World: The Hamster	
554		The Enchanted Deer	---	· (tbc)	
555		The 3 Golden Apples	Nathaniel Hawthorne	· (tbc)	
556		The Elf Mound	Hans Christian Andersen	· (tbc)	
557		Silly Willy	---	· (tbc)	
558		The Magic Dish	---	· (tbc)	
559		The Japanese Lantern	---	· (tbc)	
560		The Doll Princess	---	· (tbc)	
561		Hans Humdrum	---	· (tbc)	
562		The Enchanted Pony	---	· (tbc)	
563		The Wishing Well	---	· (tbc)	
564		The Salt Mountain	---	· (tbc)	
565		The Silly Princess	---	· (tbc)	
566		Clumsy Hans	Hans Christian Andersen	· (tbc)	
567		The Bearskin Soldier	Brothers Grimm	· (tbc)	
568		The Happy Hedgehog	Brothers Grimm	· (tbc)	
569		The Three Giants	---	· (tbc)	
570		The Pearl Princess	---	· (tbc)	
571		How Fire Came To The Indians	---	· (tbc)	
572		The Drummer Boy	---	· (tbc)	
573		The Crystal Ball	Brothers Grimm	· (tbc)	
574		Brightboots	---	· (tbc)	
575		The Fearless Prince	---	· (tbc)	
576		The Princess Who Saw Everything	---	· (tbc)	
577		The Runaway Dumpling	---	· (tbc)	

Note: None of "The Animal World" are credited with a writer, but they are all illustrated by William A. Walsh.

== References and notes ==
- Goulart, Ron. Great American Comic Books. Publications International, Ltd., 2001.
- Overstreet, Robert M.. Official Overstreet Comic Book Price Guide. House of Collectibles, 2004.
- Classics Illustrated Junior at the Grand Comics Database
- Classics Illustrated Junior at the Comic Book DB (archived from the original)
