= Hal Kanter =

American screenwriter (1918–2011)

- Born: December 18, 1918; Savannah, Georgia, U.S.
- Died: November 6, 2011 (aged 92); Encino, California, U.S.
- Occupations: Writer, producer, director
- Years active: 1954–2008
- Known for: Work as creator/executive producer of the NBC-TV series Julia as well as writer for numerous Academy Awards broadcasts
- Spouse(s): Doris Kanter (1941-2011) (his death, 3 children)

Hal Kanter (December 18, 1918 – November 6, 2011) was an American writer, producer and director, principally for comedy actors such as Bob Hope, Jerry Lewis, and Elvis Presley (in Loving You and Blue Hawaii), for both feature films and television. Kanter helped Tennessee Williams turn the play by Williams into the film version of The Rose Tattoo. He was regularly credited as a writer for the Academy Award broadcasts. Kanter was also the creator and executive producer of the television series Julia.

== Biography ==
Henry "Hal" Kanter was born in 1918 to publisher Albert Kanter and Rose Ehrenrich, a Jewish family in Savannah, Georgia. He had two siblings, William and Saralea who both worked for their father's company, Classics Illustrated and later Penny Publications. In September 1941 Hal Kanter married Doris Prudowsky, a writer and singer, of Russian Jewish heritage.

Kanter started his career peddling jokes to Eddie Cantor for his radio program. Kanter recalls, "I'd listen to his show and say, 'I can write jokes as funny as that,' so I walked from my rooming house to his show, and told the guard, 'Mr. Kanter is here to see Mr. Cantor, figuring he'd see me because of our names, although his real name was Iskowitch. I was seventeen years old and had the nerve of a burglar." Although Kanter was not hired by Cantor, one of his writers, Hugh Wedlock Jr., paid Kanter $10 per week to write jokes. Wedlock would then resell Kanter's jokes to Cantor. Kanter stated, "So I became a ghostwriter to a ghostwriter."

In March 1941 Kanter joined the United States Army, serving till the end of World War II in 1945. Kanter wrote, produced, and acted in Armed Forces Radio Service shows aired over stations KOA (AM), KLZ, and other local stations in Colorado. He built and ran radio stations in Naval Base Eniwetok and Naval Base Guam; and served as a combat correspondent on Iwo Jima.

He directed Dolores Hart in her first film, Loving You.

Kanter's autobiography, So Far, So Funny: My Life in Show Business, was published in 1999 by McFarland & Company, Inc., of Jefferson, North Carolina. The book chronicles his early life, his struggles in Hollywood during his early years, and his eventual success in show business in general and as a comedy writer in particular.

Kanter died at his home in Encino, California on November 6, 2011, at the age of 92. His wife, Doris, passed in 2014.

== See also ==
- Wisconsin Center for Film and Theater Research
