= Kismet, Man of Fate =

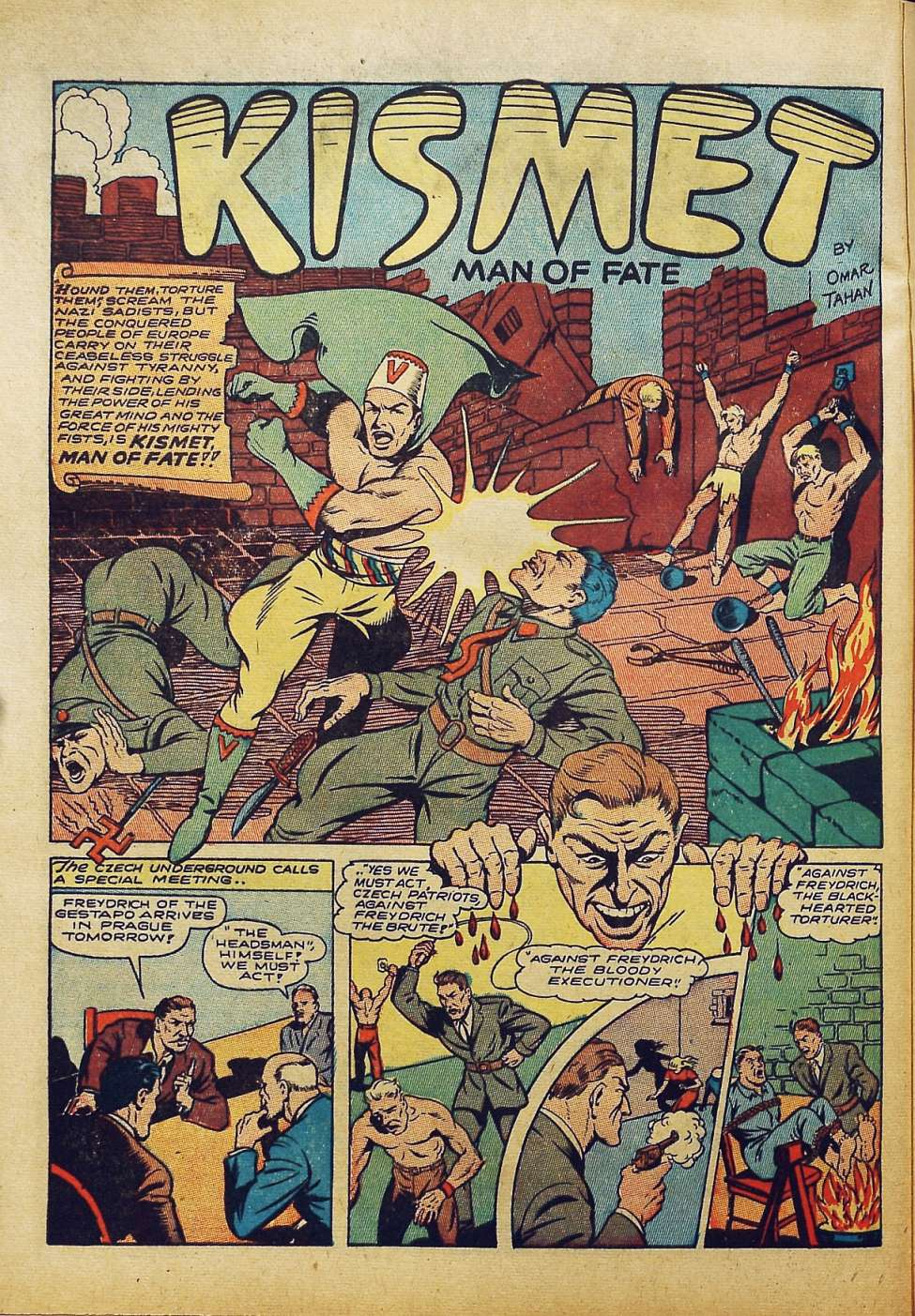
- Kismet, Man of Fate in Bomber Comics #1 (March 1944)

Publication information
- Publisher: Elliot Publishing Company, A Wave Blue World
- First appearance: Bomber Comics #1 (March 1944)
- Created by: Omar Tahan

In-story information
- Alter ego: Khalil Qisma
- Notable aliases: L'Homme du Sort, Rajul Al-Qadr, The Fez, The Green Line, The Marathon Man
- Abilities: Limited precognition ("foresense"), advanced gymnastic agility

Kismet, Man of Fate is a superhero published by Elliot Publishing Company in the Golden Age of Comic Books. The series features adventures of an Algerian superhero who was thought lost by the Allies at the end of World War II. The character originally appeared in Bomber Comics #1 (1944), making him the first identified Muslim superhero.

== 1940s publication ==
During the wartime boom of adventure comics, Elliot Publishing Company, best known for their Classics Illustrated series (as The Gilberton Company, Inc.), launched Bomber Comics, featuring several new heroes (e.g. boxer Kid Dixon, sky ace Eagle Evans, etc.) but ultimately lasting only four issues. Crediting the penname "Omar Tahan," the S. M. Iger Studio may have put writer Ruth Roche with artists Chuck Winter, Paul Cooper, inker Alex Blum, or pencilers Henry C. Kiefer and Matt Baker to originate the character of Kismet, Man of Fate. The superheroic Kismet, battling Nazis in wartime France, appeared in all four issues of Bomber Comics before it was discontinued and later fell into the public domain.

== Character biography ==
Bomber Comics revealed little of Kismet's origin, save his being Algerian and a Muslim. He was identified as an agent of the Allies and staunch enemy of the Axis powers. Moreover, even supernatural demonic forces recognized his allegiance as he thwarted Nazi plots in occupied France and Europe more largely. Never seen in any civilian attire (i.e. only ever clad in his signature fez, cape, gloves, jodhpurs, and boots), Kismet had no known alter ego or secret identity, yet he was regarded as an official operative of the Allies behind enemy lines. His prowess with fisticuffs, gymnastics, and unarmed combat suggested an ability to foresee some degree of fate, of "Allah's will" (i.e. limited precognition).

== Modern revival ==
In 2015, the end of Kismet's wartime adventures was included as part of the Broken Frontier Anthology, the product of a successful Kickstarter campaign led by Tyler Chin-Tanner and Wendy Chin-Tanner. Writer A. David Lewis, along with Noel Tuazon, Rob Croonenborghs, and Kel Nuttal, revived the character with a final wartime story.

Following the 2016 Orlando nightclub shooting, Lewis and his creative team produced a short, modern-day story of Kismet, first for GEEKED Magazine online and then reprinted by the Chin-Tanners' A Wave Blue World publishing house as part of a Free Comic Book Day 2017 give-away.

On May 2, 2017, Kismet, Man of Fate began as a weekly online series from A Wave Blue World's "Under Current" line, with Lewis, Tuazon, and Croonenborghs joined by letterer Taylor Esposito. On November 28, 2018, A Wave Blue World published a print edition entitled Kismet, Man of Fate - Volume 1: Boston Strong, featuring cover art by Natasha Alterici and a Foreword by Laila Alawa.

In July 2020, Lewis revealed that A Wave Blue World would not be producing a second volume and that he and the art team would be turning to a crowdfunding campaign instead. That effort, though successful, was shut down during the ongoing COVID-19 pandemic.

Lewis has since commented publicly that he would like to explore the character's asexuality were there future stories produced.

=== Broken Frontier conclusion ===
In the 2015 Broken Frontier Anthology story, Kismet's background is given more detail, including his full name (Khalil Qisma), his home (Algiers), and his occupation (jail guard) before becoming "Kismet." While fighting off a home invasion, Qisma discovers a fantastic material inside the wall of his house that, when worn as a cape, gives him his split-second glimpses of the future (his "foresense"). Later, he takes to the streets, thwarting local crimes until Frenchman Lamond Lamont enlists him to help in the European war effort. Leaving his wife and young children behind, Kismet accepts, leading to his Bomber Comics adventures.

Kismet's final wartime mission, however, brings him to the realization that Lamont has turned traitor and threatens the Allies plans to liberate France. He confronts Lamont who admits to his treachery just as Kismet foresees Lamont falling to his death. Unwilling to accept both his friend's betrayal and fate, Kismet denies his foresense and stops Lamont from falling; Lamont, however, does not wish to be saved and wriggles loose, falling to his slightly delayed death. Yet, Kismet's action—delaying Lamont's fate even momentarily—triggers some kind of supernatural phenomenon. Kismet suddenly disappears, removed from physical reality.

Some time later, Kismet is somehow bonded to Bostonian urban planner Qadar Hussein with whom he can communicate from a ghostly other plane of reality he terms "side-space." Qadar can switch places physically with Kismet, allowing the unaged superhero to return to action. Apparently, Qadar's sister Deena, their friend Rabia, and Lamont's descendant Larue Lamont are all aware of this double life.
