= Dell Horoscope =

Monthly Magazine of Personal Astrology

- Editor: Ronnie Grishman
- Categories: Astrology
- Frequency: Monthly
- Publisher: Dell Magazines
- Total circulation: 22,407 (2017)
- Founded: 1935
- Final issue: March/April 2020
- Company: Penny Publications
- Country: United States
- Based in: Norwalk, Connecticut
- Language: English
- Website: www.dellhoroscope.com
- ISSN: 1080-1421

Dell Horoscope was a periodic American magazine originally published by Dell Magazines and then sold to Penny Publications covering modern astrology, calling itself "the world's leading astrology magazine". It was in circulation between 1935 and 2020.

== History ==
The magazine was first published in November 1935 with the title Your Daily Horoscope: The Monthly Magazine of Personal Astrology. Its title changed several times during its existence. The magazine was published in New York City from its start in 1935 to 1985.

The publication received attention outside of the astrology community in recent years because of a 1979 article by Richard Nolle defining the concept of a supermoon.

According to its most recent statement of ownership published in the January 2018 issue, paid circulation of the magazine was 22,407 per issue.

Subscriptions were offered in print and digital formats. Print versions were found on newsstands or often in supermarket checkouts. In addition to the monthly periodical, annual yearbooks are published as well.

Dell Horoscope ended publication with the March/April 2020 issue.
