= Catholic Digest =

US Roman Catholic magazine (1936–2020)

- Cover of the March 2016 issue
- Categories: Roman Catholicism
- Publisher: Bayard U.S.
- Founder: Fr. Louis Gales
- First issue: November 1936; 89 years ago
- Final issue: Summer 2020
- Company: Bayard
- Country: United States
- Based in: New London, Connecticut
- Language: English
- Website: www.catholicdigest.com

Catholic Digest was an American Roman Catholic monthly magazine founded in 1936. By the 1950s Catholic Digest was publishing articles by such well-known Catholic authors as Fulton J. Sheen, Frank Sheed and Dorothy Day. In 2016 it was reaching two million readers. In Catholic Digest's last years in print the number of issues were decreased, and starting in 2019 there were only eight issues per year. It ceased publication after the Summer 2020 issue.

== Overview ==
During the 1930s and 40s the magazine published several articles on combating racism and prejudice. In the December 1944 issue Archbishop Francis J. Spellman wrote "No true American will nurture, promote, or incite anti-Semitic, anti-Negro, anti-Catholic, anti-any group of fellow law-abiding American citizens." The magazine also printed stories on the importance of faith and a positive attitude in gaining strength during illness. The July 1961 issue contained "What My Illness Taught Me," written by President John F. Kennedy.

Many columns appeared over the years. In May 1956 a reader wrote to Catholic Digest with a question about the Catholic faith. That letter was the start of What Would You Like to Know About the Church, which answered questions sent in by readers. The name was later changed to Ask Father and the column appeared until the magazine's demise.

In November 1987 the first Patrick's Corner appeared. Sean Patrick reminisced about growing up Catholic in Cleveland, Ohio, during the 1940s and 50s. The last Patrick's Corner was published in the Summer 2019 issue.

Several long-running columns lasted through the final issue. Perfect Assist told of people who helped those in need. The name was changed to Love Your Neighbor in March 2002. Daily Inspiration provided a short inspirational quote for each day of the month. Last Word was a two-page personal-experience essay. The first page was on the last page of the magazine, and the second on the next-to-last page.

During Catholic Digests final years, from the May 2019 issue through the June/July/August 2020 issue — the magazine averaged 74 pages of content.

== Publication history ==
=== Founding ===
Catholic Digest, originally titled The Catholic Book and Magazine Digest, was founded by Fr. Louis A. Gales, the assistant pastor of St. Agnes Church in Saint Paul, Minnesota. Gales had founded the Catechetical Guild, a company that published catechetical materials, and he wanted to publish a Catholic magazine modeled after Reader's Digest. He sent postcards to the 2,000 names on the Catechetical Guild mailing list, telling about his idea, and asking them to subscribe.

Saint Paul's Archbishop John Gregory Murray provided Gales with a loan of one thousand dollars, though he felt the magazine would fail. The archbishop also allowed Gales to use a one-room office in the Chancery basement. The office room contained the building's heating plant. Gales hired Nick Tschida, a high school student from St. Agnes Church, because Tschida could type and drive a car. Tschida would continue to work at Catholic Digest for 66 years. Gales asked a fellow Saint Paul priest, Fr. Paul Bussard to edit the magazine.

The first issue was dated November 1936, and had a print run of 13,000 copies. It had an orange paper cover, 64 pages, and no illustrations or advertisements. Previously printed religious articles were condensed to one or two pages, which made it easy for busy people to keep informed on Catholic topics.

=== Magazine expansion ===
Fr. Bussard was eager to expand the magazine and increase circulation. Original articles began being purchased and, though Catholic Digest continued to be based in Saint Paul, an additional office was opened in New York City. By 1948 the size had increased to 128 pages, and in 1961 it was up to 144 pages.

The May 1949 issue was the first to have a picture on the cover, and in the 1950s special paintings were commissioned for the covers. In 1947 the magazine reported 300,000 subscribers, and 850,000 subscribers in 1957.

=== Change of ownership ===
From 1936 until 1964 Catholic Digest was owned by founder Fr. Louis A. Gales and Fr. Paul Bussard, who was the first editor, and later took on the financial management of the publication. Bussard did not keep accurate financial records, and often carried out unwise financial transactions, such as lending money from the magazine's profits without a written agreement regarding repayment.

In 1962 Leo Binz was named the new archbishop of St. Paul and Minnesota, and he ordered a thorough audit of Catholic Digest's finances. Archbishop Binz made an interpretation of church law and declared that the two priests could no longer own the magazine. In 1964 Catholic Digest was sold to the University of St. Thomas.

In December 2001, the French Roman Catholic media group Bayard, Inc. purchased the magazine. In late 2011, Bayard closed down another of its publications, Faith & Family, moving its editor, Danielle Bean, over to Catholic Digest, which they rebooted with a new focus on faith and family.

In an April 9, 2020, press release, Baynard, Inc. announced it was closing down Catholic Digest.

== Editors ==
Fr. Paul Bussard was editor of Catholic Digest from 1936 to 1964. In December 1975 Henry Lexau became the first lay editor-in-chief and remained editor until at least 1986. In the Introduction to A Treasury of Catholic Digest — Favorite Stories of Fifty Years 1936 - 1986 Lexau remembers "editors in heaven" including Ed Harrigan, Harold O'Laughlin, Joe Aberwald and Maurice Murray. Richard J. Reece was editor in 2003, and Daniel Connors was editor-in-chief from 2005 to 2012. In March 2012 Danielle Bean became the first female editor-in-chief and Paul McKibben was the last managing editor.
