= Supermoon =

Full or new moon which appears larger

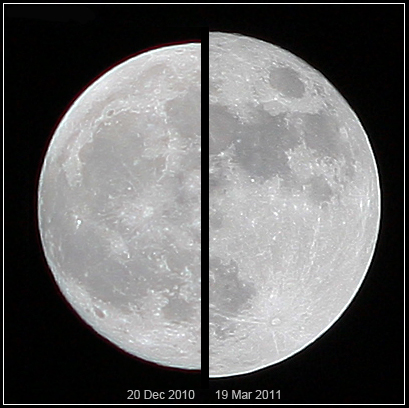
A juxtaposition of the apparent diameters of a more-average full moon on December 20, 2010 (left), and of the supermoon of March 19, 2011 (right) as viewed from Earth

A supermoon is a full moon or a new moon that nearly coincides with perigee—the closest that the Moon comes to the Earth in its orbit—resulting in a slightly larger-than-usual apparent size of the lunar disk as viewed from Earth.‍ The technical name is a perigee syzygy (of the Earth–Moon–Sun system) or a full (or new) Moon around perigee.‍ (Note: See perigee and syzygy) Because the term supermoon is astrological in origin, it has no precise astronomical definition.‍

The association of the Moon with both oceanic and crustal tides has led to claims that the supermoon phenomenon may be associated with increased risk of events like earthquakes and volcanic eruptions, but no such link has been found.‍

The opposite phenomenon, an apogee syzygy or a full (or new) Moon around apogee, has been called a micromoon.‍

== Definitions ==
The name supermoon was coined by astrologer Richard Nolle in 1979, in Dell Horoscope magazine arbitrarily defined as:

... a new or full moon which occurs with the Moon at or near (within 90% of) its closest approach to Earth in a given orbit (perigee). In short, Earth, Moon and Sun are all in a line, with Moon in its nearest approach to Earth.

— Richard Nolle‍

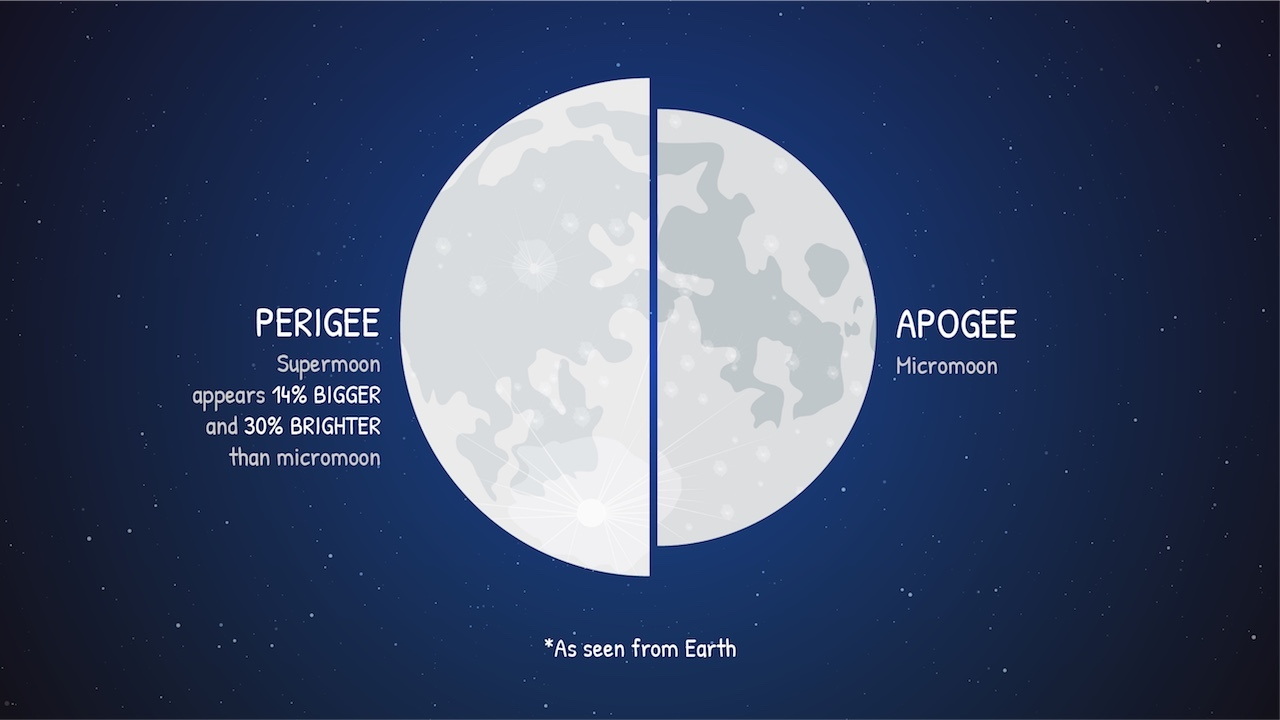
NASA image showing comparison of a supermoon (left) and a micromoon (right)

He came up with the name while reading Strategic Role Of Perigean Spring Tides in Nautical History and Coastal Flooding, published in 1976 by Fergus Wood, a hydrologist with NOAA.‍‍ Nolle explained in 2011 that he based calculations on 90% of the difference in lunar apsis extremes for the solar year. In other words, a full or new moon is considered a supermoon if $ld_s \leq ld_p + 0.1 * (ld_a - ld_p)$, where $ld_s$ is the lunar distance at syzygy, $ld_a$ is the lunar distance at the greatest apogee of the year, and $ld_p$ is the lunar distance at the smallest perigee of the year.‍‍

In practice, there is no official or even consistent definition of how near perigee the full Moon must occur to receive the supermoon label, and new moons rarely receive a supermoon label. Different sources give different definitions.‍‍

The term perigee-syzygy or perigee full/new moon is preferred in the scientific community.‍ Perigee is the point at which the Moon is closest in its orbit to the Earth, and syzygy is when the Earth, the Moon and the Sun are aligned, which happens at every full or new moon. Astrophysicist Fred Espenak uses Nolle's definition but preferring the label of full Moon at perigee, and using the apogee and perigee nearest in time rather than the greatest and least of the year.‍ Wood used the definition of a full or new moon occurring within 24 hours of perigee and also used the label perigee-syzygy.‍

Wood also coined the less-used term proxigee where perigee and the full or new moon are separated by 10 hours or less.‍ Nolle has also added the concept of extreme supermoon in 2000 describing the concept as any new or full moons that are at "100% or greater of the mean perigee".‍

== Occurrence ==
Of the possible 12 or 13 full (or new) moons each year, usually three or four may be classified as supermoons, as commonly defined.

The full moon occurred Thursday December 4, 2025 at 3:14 PST, following an occurrence on November 5, 2025. Due to the event occurring in December it is usually called the "cold moon". The full moon rises on the 4th and 5th of December, Thursday and Friday Evening.

The supermoon of November 14, 2016, was the closest full occurrence since January 26, 1948, and will not be surpassed until November 25, 2034.‍

The closest full supermoon of the 21st century will occur on December 6, 2052.‍

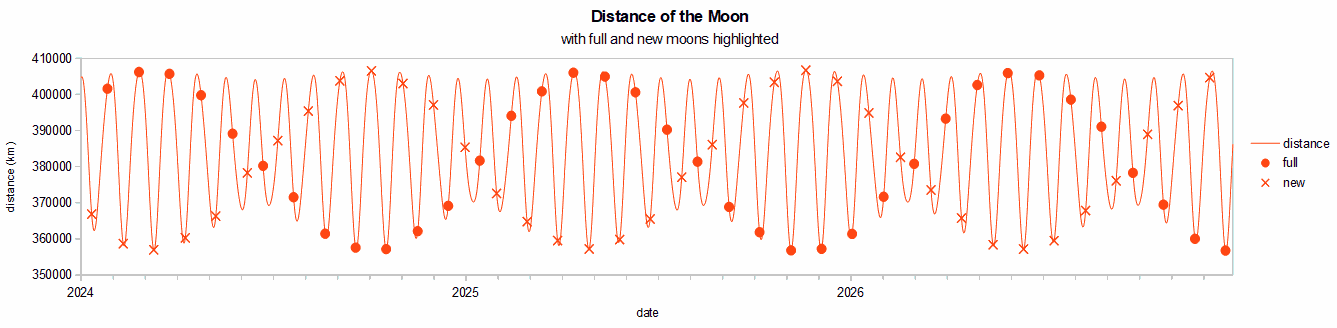
Supermoons will be the marked points nearest the bottom of the graph.

The oscillating nature of the distance to the full or new moon is due to the difference between the synodic month‍ (Note: The time it takes for the Moon to complete a full progression through its phases: one lunation.) and anomalistic months.‍‍ (Note: The time it takes for the Moon to return to either of its orbital apses (perigee or apogee). This differs slightly from a lunation because the Moon's orbit gradually precesses around Earth. If the synodic and anomalistic months were identical, the Moon would always be the same distance from Earth for a given lunar phase.) The period of this oscillation is about 14 synodic months, which is close to 15 anomalistic months. Thus every 14 lunations there is a full moon nearest to perigee.

Occasionally, a supermoon coincides with a total lunar eclipse. The most recent occurrence of this by any definition was in May 2022, and the next occurrence will be in October 2033.‍

In the Islamic calendar (a lunar calendar), the occurrence of full supermoons follows a seven-year cycle. In the first year, the full moon is near perigee in month 1 or 2, the next year in month 3 or 4, and so on. In the seventh year of the cycle the full moons are never very near to perigee. Approximately every 20 years the occurrences move to one month earlier. As of Gregorian year 2025 such a transition is occurring, so full supermoons occur twice in succession. For example in Hijri year 1446, they occur both in month 3 (Rabīʿ al-ʾAwwal, on September 18, 2024) and in month 4 (Rabīʿ ath-Thānī, on October 17, 2024).

== Appearance ==
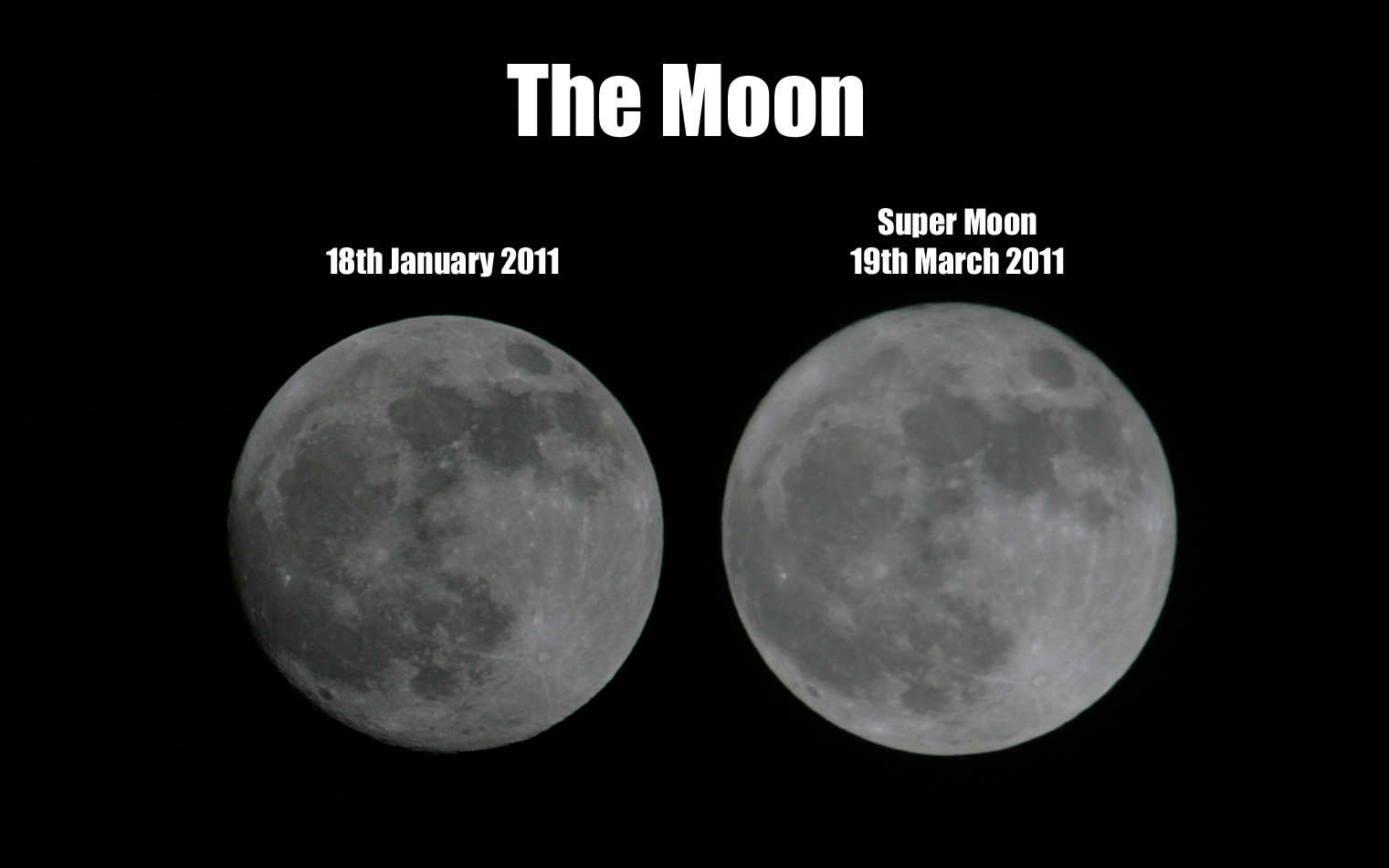
The supermoon of March 19, 2011 (right), compared to an average full moon of January 18, 2011 (left), as viewed from Earth

A full moon at perigee appears roughly 14% larger in diameter than at apogee.‍ Many observers insist that the Moon looks bigger to them. This is likely due to observations shortly after sunset when the Moon appears near the horizon and the Moon illusion is at its most apparent.‍

While the Moon's surface luminance remains the same, because it is closer to the Earth the illuminance is about 30% brighter than at its farthest point, or apogee. This is due to the inverse square law of light, which changes the amount of light received on Earth in inverse proportion to the distance from the Moon. But, the perceived brightness will be the same; the Moon will just be smaller in one's field of view. That change in size is exactly proportional to the change in the amount of light.‍ A supermoon directly overhead could provide up to 0.36 lux.‍

== Effects on Earth ==
Claims that supermoons can cause natural disasters, and the claim of Nolle that supermoons cause "geophysical stress", have been refuted by scientists.‍‍‍‍

Despite lack of scientific evidence, there has been media speculation that natural disasters, such as the 2011 Tōhoku earthquake and tsunami and the 2004 Indian Ocean earthquake and tsunami, are causally linked with the 1–2-week period surrounding a supermoon.‍ The 7.5 magnitude 2016 Kaikōura earthquake in New Zealand also coincided with a supermoon.‍‍ Tehran earthquake on May 8, 2020, also coincided with a supermoon.

Scientists have confirmed that the combined effect of the Sun and Moon on the Earth's oceans, the tide,‍ is greatest when the Moon is either new or full.‍ and that during lunar perigee, the tidal force is somewhat stronger,‍ resulting in perigean spring tides. While this increased tidal force is relatively weak‍‍‍ (Note: As an average of 1000 earthquakes of magnitude 5 or greater (18 >= magn. 7),‍ and multiple "supermoons", occur yearly, the law of truly large numbers guarantees that over a sufficiently-long interval, numerous "large" earthquakes will occur around the time of supermoons. Refuting the null hypothesis ("there is no relation between the variables") would entail demonstrating evidence for an alternative hypothesis, such as a statistically significant increase in earthquake frequency around the time of certain events. The inverse—formulating a hypothesis, then looking back through already-gathered data to find support (and disregarding unsupportive data)—is known as data dredging (see also Texas sharpshooter fallacy, apophenia).) in a global geophysical context, it can induce measurable local effects. For example, research based on 25 years of daily observations on a sandy beach has shown that the larger tidal ranges produced by supermoons, known as king tides, make beach erosion in the upper swash zone more likely.‍ These long-term data indicate that beach morphology fluctuates in cycles related to the supermoon, and that erosion during high waves can be more severe when coincident with a supermoon.

== Super Blood Moon ==
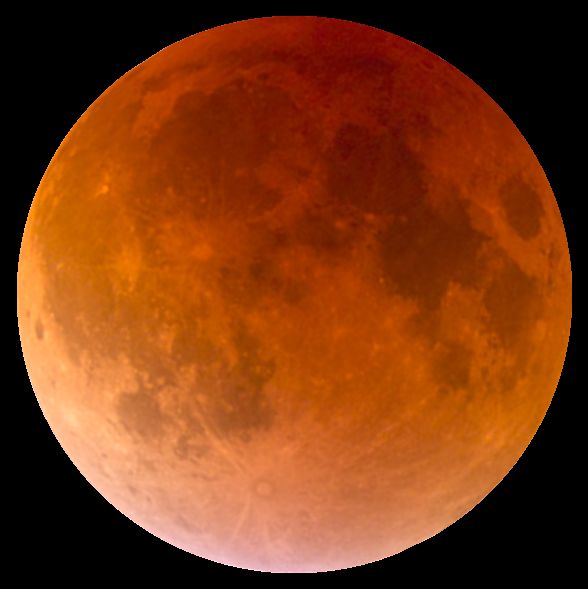
A Super Blood Moon on September 27, 2015

Total lunar eclipses which fall on supermoon and micromoon days are relatively rare. In the 21st century, there are 87 total lunar eclipses, of which 28 are supermoons and 6 are micromoons. Almost all total lunar eclipses in Lunar Saros 129 are micromoon eclipses.

The Super Blood Moon is an astronomical event that combines two phenomena: a supermoon and a total lunar eclipse, resulting in a larger, brighter, and reddish-colored Moon. A total lunar eclipse takes place when the Earth aligns between the Sun and the Moon, causing Earth's shadow to fall on the Moon. As the shadow covers the Moon, sunlight passing through Earth's atmosphere scatters, filtering out most blue light and casting a reddish hue on the Moon. This phenomenon is often called a blood moon because of its striking red or orange color.

When these two events coincide, the Moon appears both larger and redder than usual, leading to the term Super Blood Moon. This alignment creates a sight that has inspired folklore and intrigue for centuries. Super Blood Moons are relatively infrequent, occurring about once every few years, making them a notable event for astronomers and skywatchers alike.

== Annular solar eclipses ==
Annular solar eclipses occur when the Moon's apparent diameter is smaller than the Sun's. Almost all annular solar eclipses between 1880 and 2060 in Solar Saros 144 and almost all annular solar eclipses between 1940 and 2120 in Solar Saros 128 are micromoon annular solar eclipses.‍

== See also ==
- Apsis – Either of two extreme points in a celestial object's orbit
- Moon illusion – Perceived variation in the Moon's size
- Syzygy (astronomy) – Alignment of celestial bodies
- Wet moon – Horizontal (bowl appearance) crescent
