= Askeladden =

Main character in many Norwegian folktales

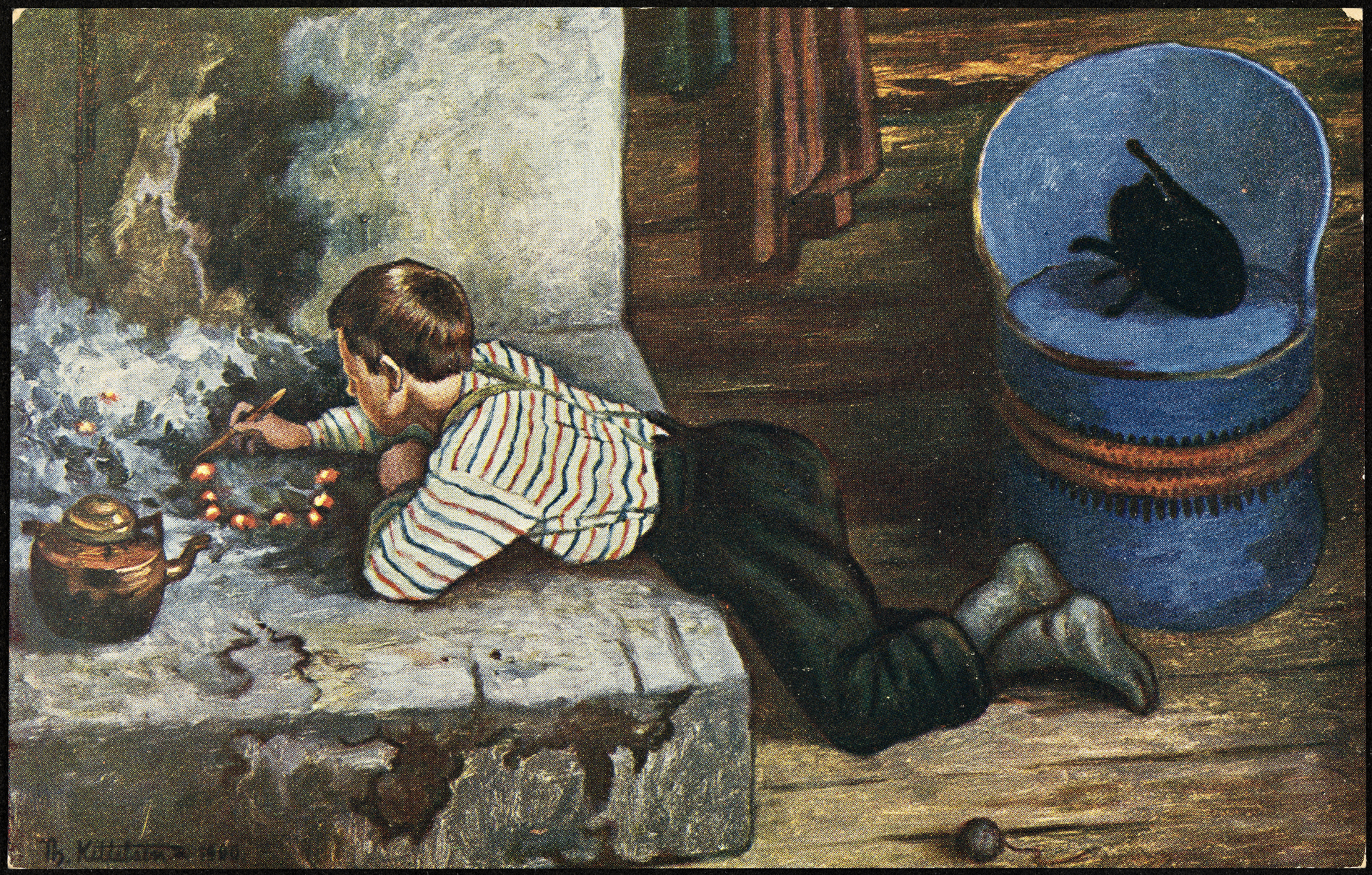
Askeladden by Theodor Kittelsen (1900) Original painting owned by the National Museum, Oslo

Ashlad (Norwegian "Askeladden" or "Oskeladden", full name "Esben Askelad" or "Espen Askeladd" or "Espen Oskeladd") is a main character in several tales collected in Asbjørnsen and Moe's Norwegian Folktales.

The character starts out being regarded as an incapable underachiever, but eventually proves himself by overcoming some prodigious deed, succeeding where all others have failed.

The character's name appeared as Boots in Dasent's 19th-century English translations.

== Name ==
The name Askeladden (meaning 'ash-lad') or Askeladd is the standard form which Asbjørnsen and Moe eventually settled for. However, the storytellers used this (Note: With variant spelling "Aaskeladen") alongside other variant names such as Askefis, sometimes interchangeably within the same tale. (Note: "A folklore collector noticed that one informant began a tale with the name 'Aaskefis'n' but later on called him 'Aaskeladden'"; "another storyteller used Askeladden for the name throughout but commented, 'We used to call him Aaskefisen.' Brunvald, citing NFS, Langset VI, field notes.)

The most frequently recorded original name was Oskefisen or Askefis, glossed as a person who blows on the coal to stoke the fire. (Note: Or, by Jørgen Moe, explained as "he who blows in the grate to get the fire up".) The latter word is attested since the 15th century, in proverbs. This would make sense, as the job of blowing on the embers was often assigned to the person of the household who was considered the least fit for other, more demanding chores – typically a fragile grandmother or a small child.

But because the editors felt Askefis to be too rustic, they favoured the name Askeladden (or altered it to Askepot), which seemed more refined. This adulteration was derided by P. A. Munch as overly prim and lacking courage. In Asbjørnsens's first edition (1843), the name appears as Askepot, which in Norway is commonly associated with Cinderella. The name was changed to Askeladden in the second edition, but strangely enough, in the first tale ("About Askeladden who Stole from the Troll"), the name Askepot was still retained in the narrative itself.

The form Esben Askepot was later changed to Esben Askelad in the second edition by Asbjørnsen and Moe, then later to Espen Askeladd by Moltke Moe (Note: The tale, " "Peer and Paul and Esben Askelad" in the second edition was No. 50; changed to Espen Askeladd and no. 49 in later editions (1904).)

=== Etymology ===
Askelad or Askeladd (without the definite -en suffix) are Danized, or Dano-Norwegian forms. The Norwegian form Oske-ladd is composed of oske 'ash' and ladd 'hair sock' (related to loden 'hairy, shaggy'), (Note: And further related to Old Norse loðinn and the byname of Ragnarr Loðbrók, "Shaggy Breeches".) with the explanation that ashes allowed to cling to the feet seem like furry socks.

A more conjectural etymology hypothesizes the second part to be related to lodden meaning "blow gently", which conforms with the idea behind the name Askefis, of a person who blows on the embers to enliven the fire.

As for Esben Oskelad, Esben is said to be a variant of Esbern, cognate with the Norse name Asbjørn and English name Osborn.

=== English translations ===
Askeladd/Oskeladd has been rendered into English as "Cinderlad" (or "Ash-Lad"), this fails to accurately reflect the meaning as outlined above.

George Webbe Dasent chose to translate the name (Askefis, Askepot) as "Boots", which was criticized as a "disenchanting rendering" of "Cinderson" by The Athenaeum literary magazine, but defended as "aptly styled" by Scottish folklorist W. A. Clouston. Dasent was well aware of cognate names in Scots English dialects, such as "Ashiepattle" and "Ashypet". Dasent says he coined the name "Boots" as representative of the tradition in English households that the youngsters of the family were expected to perform the meanest chores. He fails to elaborate more than this, but "boots" is glossed as "the servant at an inn who pulls off and cleans the boots of travellers" in a dictionary from the Victorian Era.

== General description ==
Askeladden is characterised as the runt of the family, being "the youngest, smallest, and weakest", yet "clever, bold, patient", and against all odds, eventually successful. The hero has great rewards in store, often the princess's hand in marriage and half the kingdom.

However, as Jan Brunvand has noted, there is somewhat of a gap between the Askeladden in the actual folktales, and the national hero and symbol of every countryman (Norwegian: landsmann) to which he has been elevated by the Norwegian populace.

In the folktales, by all accounts, Askeladden remains near the hearth and idly "roots about", but according to Norwegian sources, he is forced by his family to sit in the ashes in the hearth.

The character is also closely related to the common and quite nationalistic jokes of the three Scandinavian archetypes, the Norwegian, the Swede and the Dane. In those jokes, the Norwegian always succeeds in petty contests where the others do not. The jokes resemble the fairy-tale pattern and are mostly told by Norwegian children. Here, one can interpret the Norwegian as the youngest and underdog brother of the three, a parallel to the historical facts of Norway's position in Scandinavia.

== List of folktales ==
Askeladden is the protagonist in numerous folk tales:

Name	Translated name	Remarks
Om Askeladden som stjal Troldets Sølvander, Sengetæppe, og Gulharpe (NF #1);	About Ash Lad, Who Stole the Troll's Silver Ducks, Coverlet, and Golden Harp.	
Spurningen (NF #4);	The Quandary. (Note: Translated as "Taming the Shrew" by Dasent (1859).)	
Prinsessen som ingen kunne målbinde (NF #4 var.); (Note: A "slight variant" of Spurningen.)	The Princess who always had to have the Last Word.	
Askeladden som kappåt med trollet (NF #6);	Ash Lad, Who Competed with the Troll.	
Dukken i gresset (NF #25);	The Doll in the Grass.	
De syv folene (NF #31)	The Seven Foals.	
Risen som ikke hadde noe hjerte på seg (NF #36)	About the Giant Troll Who Never Carried His Heart With Him.	
Det har ingen nød med den som alle kvinnfolk er glad i (NF #38)	Nothing is Needed by the One That All Women Love.	
Askeladden som fikk prinsessen til å løgste seg (NF #39)	Ash Lad, Who Got the Princess to Say He Was Lying.	
Per, Pål og Espen Askeladd (NF #49)	Per and Paal and Esben Ash Lad.	
Jomfruen på glassberget (NF #51);	The Maiden on the Glass Mountain.	
Gullslottet som hang i luften (Ny Samling #72)	The Golden Castle that Hung in the Air (Note: Dasent: "The Golden Palace That Hung in the Air")	
Rødrev og Askeladden (Ny Samling #76)	Osborn Boots and Mr. Glibtongue	
Askeladden og de gode hjelperne (Ny Samling #79)	The Ash Lad and the Good Helpers (Note: Dasent:"Boots and his Crew")	
Gjete kongens harer (Ny Samling #98)	The King's Hares.	

== Survey of folktales ==
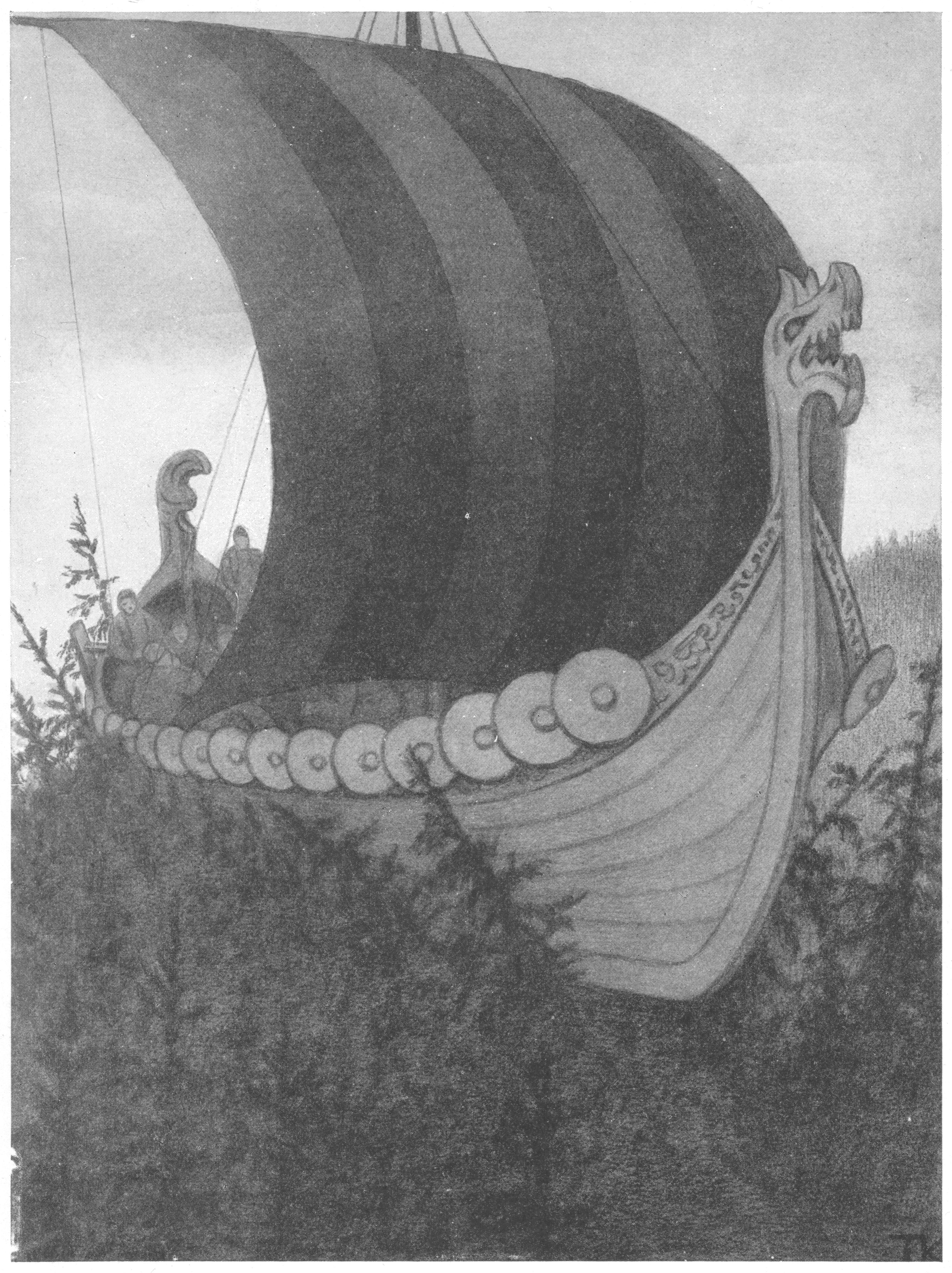
Askeladden og de gode hjelperne by Theodor Kittelsen. illustration from Samlede eventyr. Norske kunstneres billedutgave by Asbjørnsen and Moe

In many folk tales, the Ash Lad is portrayed as the youngest of three brothers. Early in a typical tale, the older brothers appear to have much greater chances of success in life. For example, one brother might be extremely well read, whereas another might be extremely competent in another area. In contrast, the Ash Lad is looked down upon as a seemingly drowsy ne'er do well, perhaps even as a loner or misunderstood eccentric, who spends too much time sitting by the fireplace lost in thought as he is poking the ashes.

As the typical story unfolds, the oldest brothers try first to heroically overcome some major crisis or problem. As an example, one tale involves rescuing a princess held captive in a land East of the Sun and West of the Moon (akin to the homonymous fairy tale). The two older brothers, who are tied to conventional thinking, typically fall flat on their faces. In contrast, it is the Ash Lad who comes up with creative solutions. He is smarter, more tactical, more receptive, and more aware of the needs of others. He outwits trolls, dodges charging unicorns, or gets a magic Viking ship to transport him (similar to an also-popular folk tale, "The Fool and the Flying Ship"), where he ultimately saves the princess.

The "heroic" trait of the character is probably most prominent in the stories told by Peter Christen Asbjørnsen and Jørgen Moe. The tales they collected present the "classical" Ash Lad. In other stories, collected by others, the character and his brothers are presented as mere scoundrels, even thieves. Those stories present the youngest brother as the one with the wits about him, and thus, he gets away with the loot. They always steal from the wealthy farmers or even the king, similar to the fabled Robin Hood. Those stories are documented from Vest-Agder, in their time, the poorest parts of Norway, where suppression was common. Thus, the Ash Lad has some similarities with the Norwegian crime writer Gjest Baardsen (1791–1849).

== Further analysis ==
The origin of the Askeladden character has been sought by some scholars in the old Norse god Loki, in his aspect as a fire vættir.

=== Parallels ===
In the "Peer and Paul and Esben Askelad," the father does not own even the shirt on his back, and tells his sons to make their fortune in the world. There is a variant collected by the NFS (Norsk Folkeminnesamling) where the father says he only has ragged skin trousers for clothes to provide, and sends out his sons to the world. To this has been found an Irish counterpart "Adventures of Gilla Na Chreck An Gour" (recté "Adventure of [an] Giolla an Chroicinn Gabhair" or 'The Fellow with the Goat-skin'), which is an ash-lad tale in which the woman provides the boy kept around the hearth with a goat-skin to wrap around the waist.

== Derivative literature ==
It has been observed that Henrik Ibsen's play Peer Gynt draws from Norwegian folklore, with some portions in particular owing to Askeladden tales. Albert Morey Sturtevant argued that Ibsen's almost proverbial phrase,

Den tør være nyttig til mange til ting
sa'e Ebsen, han tog op en skæreving

— Ibsen
Translation:

It may be useful for many a thing
quoth Esben and picked up a magpie's wing

— Sturtevant tr.

which express the notion that one may never know the usefulness of seemingly trifling things until it is tested, derived from Per, Pål og Espen Askeladd (where Esben and Espen Askeladd are equivalent). (Note: NF 49 listed above.) But Henri Logeman contested the choice of tale, and instead favored Spurningen, for in that story Askeladden not merely finds trifling things, but his finds included a dead magpie, like Ibsen's verse (A variant of Spurningen was published later, entitled Prinsessen som ingen kunne målbinde, and is also an alternative strong candidate). (Note: NF 4 Spurningen listed above, and Prinsessen som ingen kunne målbinde from the Eventyrbog for Børn ("Folktale-book for a child").)

== See also ==
- Aladdin
- Fire Boy (folktale)
- Ivan Tsarevich
- Jack (hero)
- Soria Moria Castle
- The Six Servants
- Vinland Saga
