= Ruth Roche =

Ruth Roche may refer to:

- Ruth Roche, Baroness Fermoy (1908–1993), friend and confidante of Queen Elizabeth The Queen Mother and the maternal grandmother of Diana, Princess of Wales
- Ruth Roche (comics) (1917–1983), comics writer and editor
