= Gilberton (publisher) =

American comic book publisher, known for Classics Illustrated

The Gilberton Company, Inc.
- Parent company: Elliot Publishing Company (1941–1942); Frawley Corporation (from 1967)
- Founded: 1942; 84 years ago
- Founder: Albert Lewis Kanter
- Defunct: 1971; 55 years ago
- Country of origin: United States
- Headquarters location: New York City
- Key people: William E. Kanter, Hal Kanter
- Publication types: Comic books
- Fiction genres: Adaptations of literary classics
- Imprints: Many (see below)

The Gilberton Company, Inc. (/ˈɡɪlbərtən/) was an American publisher best known for the comic book series Classics Illustrated featuring adaptations of literary classics. Beginning life as an imprint of the Elliot Publishing Company, the company became independent in 1942, Between 1941 and 1962, domestic sales of Gilberton's publications totaled 200 million. Gilberton was sold to the Frawley Corporation in 1967. The company ceased publishing in 1971.

== History ==
Russian-born publisher Albert Lewis Kanter (1897–1973) recognizing the appeal of early comic books, believed he could use the new medium to introduce young and reluctant readers to "great literature". In October 1941, with the backing of two business partners, he created Classic Comics for Elliot Publishing Company, its debut issue being The Three Musketeers, followed by Ivanhoe and The Count of Monte Cristo. In addition to the literary adaptations, the comics featured author profiles, educational fillers, and ads for the coming titles. In later editions, a catalog of titles and a subscription order form appeared on back covers.

Ruth Roche created the first Muslim superhero, Kismet, Man of Fate, published in Gilberton's Bomber Comics #1-4 (1944).

By the time of Classics Comics #4, in 1942, the title outgrew the space it shared with Elliot, and Kanter moved the operation to different offices, changing the corporate identity to the Gilberton Company, Inc. Reprints of previous titles began in 1943. Wartime paper shortages forced Kanter to reduce the 64-page format to 56 pages, and, in 1948, rising paper costs reduced books to 48 pages. With issue #35 in March 1947 (The Last Days of Pompeii) the Classic Comics series' name was changed to Classics Illustrated.

In 1946, the founder's son William E. "Bill" Kanter (born 1923) became an editor at Gilberton. Kanter was instrumental in getting Classics Illustrated distributed nationally in the U.S. through Curtis Circulation, alongside magazines like The Saturday Evening Post, Ladies' Home Journal, Holiday, The Atlantic, and Esquire.

Beginning in 1947, Classics Illustrated began to be distributed internationally, in English-speaking countries like Australia (Ayers & James, 1947–1953), Canada (via Gilberton, 1948–1951), and the United Kingdom (Thorpe & Porter, 1951–1963). Translated versions of the series became popular in Brazil (Editora Brasil-América Limitada, 1948–1961), Greece (Ekdóseis Pechlivanídi, the period 1951–1990), Mexico (Editora de Periódicos La Prensa, 1951–1973), and Norway (Serieforlaget, 1954–1956, before being taken over by a Gilberton branch).

Classics Illustrated's success spawned imitators, including Stories by Famous Authors Illustrated, published by Seaboard Publishing. As detailed on the Grand Comics Database:

Seaboard published 5 issues of Fast Fiction, skipped a month[, and] then reprinted them in order as Stories by Famous Authors Illustrated, followed by 8 new issues. . . . Their format was identical to Classics Illustrated and [they used] the main Classics artist, Henry C. Kiefer, [for] at least 4 or 5 issues of [the title]. Gilberton . . . acquired Seaboard before the 14th issue was published. Gilberton acquired not only the company name but also the 30 pages drawn for Red Badge of Courage, which they published in the 98th issue of Classics Illustrated.

In addition to Classics Illustrated, Gilberton published its spin-offs Classics Illustrated Junior (1953–1962), Classics Illustrated Special Issue (1955–1964), and The World Around Us (1958–1961).

The publication of new titles ceased in 1962 for various reasons. The company lost its second-class mailing permit; and cheap paperbacks, CliffsNotes, and television drew readers away from the series. Gilberton's last new issue was Classics Illustrated #167 Faust (August 1962), although other issues had been planned.

=== Gilberton World-Wide Publications ===
In the period 1956–1957, when the popularity of Classics Illustrated was at its height, the company created Gilberton World-Wide Publications, establishing a number of Northern European branch companies to translate Classics Illustrated into their languages — in Denmark (Illustrerede Klassikere), the Netherlands (Classics), Norway (Illustrerte Klassikere), Sweden (Illustrerade Klassiker), and West Germany (Illustrierte Klassiker). (The Norwegian branch took over publishing Classics Illustrated from Serieforlaget).

In 1959, Gilberton acquired the British publisher/distributor Thorpe & Porter (which had been distributing UK editions of Classics Illustrated since 1951). In 1962, the production of new issues of Classics Illustrated shifted from Gilberton's New York offices to Thorpe & Porter, with the publisher's son Bill Kanter overseeing everything beginning in 1963. As a consequence, some of the planned, unpublished issues of the U.S. Classics Illustrated appeared in some foreign editions.

Bill Kanter was very involved with Gilberton World-Wide Productions; in 1965, Gilberton's Swedish branch, Illustrerade Klassiker, was reorganized into Williams Förlag AB — one theory is that the Williams name was derived from William Kanter.

In 1966, after going bankrupt, Thorpe & Porter was sold off to National Comics Publications (i.e., DC Comics); this sale included all the Gilberton World-Wide Productions European branches. A few years later, in 1971, all those branches — now in the hands of Warner Bros. — were renamed some variation of Williams Publishing.

=== 1967 sale and demise ===
In 1967, Kanter sold Gilberton to Catholic business magnate Patrick Frawley's Twin Circle Publishing Co., which brought out two more issues of Classics Illustrated but mainly concentrated on foreign sales and reprinting older titles. After four years, Twin Circle discontinued the line because of poor distribution. By the early 1970s, Classics Illustrated and Junior had been discontinued, although the Classics Illustrated branding would be used on a number of made-for-television films in the period 1978–1982, including The Time Machine, Donner Pass: The Road to Survival, and The Legend of Sleepy Hollow. Since the series' demise, various companies have reprinted its titles.

== Imprints ==
- Classics Illustrated
- Elliot Publishing Company
- Famous Authors, Ltd.
- Gilberton Company
- Gilberton Company (Canada) Limited
- Gilberton Company, Inc.
- Gilberton Corporation
- Gilberton World-Wide Publications, Inc.
- Long Island Independent
- The Gilberton Publishing Company (Canada) Limited

== Titles published ==
- Classic Comics (1941–1947) — Name-changed in March 1947 to Classics Illustrated with issue #35 (The Last Days of Pompeii).
- Bomber Comics (1944)
- Classics Illustrated (1947–1967)
- Classics Illustrated Junior (1953–1971)
- Classics Illustrated Special Issue (1955–1962)
- The World Around Us (1958–1961)

== See also ==
- Pendulum Press
- Penny Publications

== Sources ==
- Elliot at Grand Comics Database
- Gilberton at Grand Comics Database
