= Albert Kanter =

Russian-American publisher and creator of Classics Illustrated

- Born: April 11, 1897 Baranovitch, Russian Empire (now Belarus)
- Died: March 17, 1973 (aged 75) U.S.
- Area: Publisher
- Notable works: Gilberton; Classics Illustrated; Classics Illustrated Junior
- Spouse: Rose Ehrenrich (m. 1917)

Albert Lewis Kanter (April 11, 1897 – March 17, 1973) was the creator of Classics Illustrated and Classics Illustrated Junior. Kanter began creating Classic Comics with "The Three Musketeers" in October 1941. His renditions of classic novels in comic book form popularized classic tales for a younger audience.

== Life and work ==
=== Early life ===
Kanter was born in Baranovitch in the Russian Empire (now Belarus) and immigrated to the United States in 1904. He then lived in Nashua, New Hampshire, for some time. He left high school at the age of sixteen, and worked as a traveling salesman for years. He married Rose Ehrenrich in 1917 and moved to Savannah, Georgia. They had three children, named Henry (Hal), William, and Saralea.

=== Career ===
Kanter worked in real estate in Miami, but the Great Depression put an end to it, and Kanter moved his family to New York City. He worked for Colonial Press and then Elliot Publishing Company (which may have been an imprint of Malverne Herald). Elliot got into the comics market in 1941; one of their first titles was Double-Up Comics, which was made up of remaindered superhero comics from other publishers (like Harvey's Pocket Comics and Speed Comics).

Kanter was inspired to create comics based on classic novels in 1939 when his children showed more interest in reading horror comics instead of the classic novels in their home library. He started out by commissioning an illustrated version of Alexandre Dumas' The Three Musketeers. Recognizing the appeal of early comics, Kanter believed he could use the burgeoning medium to introduce young and reluctant readers to "great literature". In October 1941, with the backing of two business partners, he created Classic Comics.

Classic Comics' success opened classic novels to a large audience of young people for decades. During World War II the U.S. military and the American Red Cross ordered over 40,000,000 copies for distribution. By August 1967 1.5 billion copies of 167 titles were printed globally and translated into 32 languages.

By the time of Classics Illustrated #4, in 1942, the title outgrew the space it shared with Elliot, and Kanter moved the operation to different offices, creating the corporate identity Gilberton Company, Inc. Classic Comics later became Classics Illustrated in March 1947, with the release of "The Last Days of Pompeii", the 35th issue.

In addition to Classics Illustrated, Kanter presided over its spin-offs Classics Illustrated Junior, Specials, and The World Around Us. Between 1941 and 1962, sales totaled 200 million.

The last Classics Illustrated comic created was The Negro Americans in 1965. In 1969, for health reasons, Kanter sold his company to Twin Circle Publishing Co. Its conservative Catholic publisher Patrick Frawley, whose Frawley Corporation brought out two more titles but mainly concentrated on foreign sales and reprinting older titles. By the early 1970s, Classics Illustrated and Junior had been discontinued.

Albert's brother, Mike Kanter, worked as Classics Illustrated's distribution manager. Albert Kanter's son William "Bill" Ehrenreich Kanter and daughter Saralea Kanter Emerson worked for Classics Illustrated for many years. Saralea was an editor of the company's crossword puzzle publications. Gilberton published its first puzzle magazine in 1962. Gilberton became Penny Press in 1973 created by Bill and his wife, Penny. Their sons, Peter, Buzz, and Andy also worked for Penny Press.

Kanter's first born son, Hal Kanter, was writer-producer-director of films and television series and specials. All three of Albert and Rose's children were born in Savannah, Georgia.
