= The Tempest (media company) =

Internet media and entertainment company

The Tempest, Inc.
- Website type: Media and Entertainment
- Headquarters: Austin, TX, {{{location_country}}}
- Founders: Laila Alawa, Mashal Waqar
- Key people: Laila Alawa (Founder & CEO); Mashal Waqar (Co-founder); Lauren McEwen (CFO); Arsh Khan (COO)
- Launched: Spring 2016
- Current status: Inactive

The Tempest was an American multinational digital media and entertainment company for women and non-binary individuals that was founded in 2016 by Laila Alawa. Their purpose was to serve as "the destination for diverse women to share, inspire, and celebrate life through storytelling, experiences, and a global community." It was owned by The Tempest, Inc. The site has been inactive since October 2021 and the domain is inoperable.

== History ==
The Tempest was founded by Laila Alawa (CEO) in 2016. Alawa had worked at the White House and Congress for three years prior but left to found the new company. In 2017, Alawa tapped Mashal Waqar to join the company as her co-founder. The name of the website alludes to the disruption that diverse storytelling by women brings to the world. As of 2021, Cheddar reported that The Tempest reaches an audience of over 10 million globally.

In 2020, it surpassed 8 million monthly visitors. The Tempest's increasing global popularity among young women is attributed in part to its young staff. Writers are advised to write about stories that interest them; this can range from international politics and up-and-coming beauty influencers to technology and cultural experiences.

On December 22, 2020, The Tempest announced Federica Bocco as the publication's new Editor-in-Chief.

Around October 2021, posts on the Facebook and Twitter pages ceased and the website is no longer active, with no explanation provided.

== Content ==
The Tempest produces editorial and video programming, live events, and social, shareable content delivered across major social media platforms, and covers a variety of categories including style, health, food, entertainment, careers, technology, news, politics, and more.

More than 2,000 contributors identifying as women or non-binary from more than twenty countries regularly contribute original content. In January 2021, The Tempest launched a vertical dedicated to literary analyses. Prior to the launch, book reviews on The Tempest were widespread but unfocused.

== Impact ==
A study on ethnic media consumption and production by Professors Matthew D. Matsaganis of Rutgers University and Shirley Yu of University of Toronto found that The Tempest actively creates conversations around the socioeconomics of the digital space, journalistic norms, and personal concepts of identity.

== Reception ==
Founder and CEO, Laila Alawa, is a Forbes 30 Under 30, called by Forbes "a leader transforming the future of media".

Forbes 30 Under 30 named the company to their Middle East list in 2019.
