= Patrick Frawley =

American businessman

- Born: Patrick Joseph Frawley, Jr. May 26, 1923; León, Nicaragua
- Died: November 3, 1998 (aged 75); Santa Monica, California
- Occupations: Businessman, Publisher, Producer
- Known for: Frawley Pen Company/Paper Mate; Schick; Technicolor, Inc. Frawley Corporation; Twin Circle Publishing Co. Classics Illustrated
- Spouse: Geraldine Frawley (m. 1945)
- Children: two sons, five daughters
- Parent(s): Patrick Frawley and Maria (née Peugnet)
- Family: 5 sisters, Joan, Louise, Irene, Mary and Agnes Frawley

Patrick Joseph Frawley, Jr. (1923–1998) was a Nicaraguan-American business magnate whose portfolio included Paper Mate, Schick, and Technicolor, Inc. A devout Catholic, he was a leading American conservative figure from the late 1950s onward. He became involved in publishing and film production from the late 1960s.

== Biography ==
Frawley was born in León, Nicaragua, to an Irish-born father and a French-Spanish mother. He grew up in San Francisco, though he dropped out of high school and returned to Nicaragua as a teenager to learn the ways of business from his father.

Because of his father's United Kingdom citizenship, Frawley enlisted in the Royal Canadian Air Force and served in World War II. In 1945, he married a Canadian woman named Geraldine and settled in San Francisco.

Shortly after the war, Frawley acquired his first company, a ballpoint pen parts manufacturer that had defaulted on its loan, renaming it the Frawley Pen Company. In 1949, the Frawley Pen Company developed an ink that dried instantly; the pen that delivered this ink was called "The Paper Mate." The company claims to have made the "first pen with a retractable ballpoint tip" in 1950.

In 1955, the Frawley Pen Company was obtained by The Gillette Company, Inc. for $15.5 million, and formed the basis for the Paper Mate Division of Gillette. Frawley used the profits to buy controlling shares in Shick and Technicolor, Inc.

Fidel Castro's takeover of a Shick factory in Cuba in 1958 awakened Frawley politically, and from that point forward he advocated (mostly behind the scenes) for anti-communist causes. Frawley and Walter Knott, founder of Knott's Berry Farm, provided financial support to Barry Goldwater's 1964 presidential campaign, and they funded Fred Schwarz's anticommunist rallies. He provided funds to the anti-communist Information Council of the Americas (INCA), founded in 1961. His Schick Company sponsored television showings of the INCA film "Hitler in Havana" (1966), which suggested that Castro had culpability in the assassination of President Kennedy.

Frawley had alcohol addiction problems, and in 1964 checked into the Shadel Sanatorium in Seattle for aversion therapy. He thought the experience was so valuable that he "bought the hospital for Schick, and renamed it Schick Shadel."

In 1967, Frawley established the Twin Circle Publishing Co. as a subsidiary of Schick Investment Corp, founding the Catholic weekly newspaper Twin Circle. That same year, he acquired Gilberton's Classics Illustrated line of comic books from founder Albert Kanter. He continued selling Classics Illustrated and its sister series Classics Illustrated Junior under the publisher name the Frawley Corporation. Frawley published the series final titles, "In Freedom's Cause" and "Negro Americans," in 1969, but mainly concentrated on foreign sales and reprinting older titles. By the early 1970s, Classics Illustrated and Classics Illustrated Junior had been discontinued, although Frawley held on to the rights at least through the mid-1980s.

By 1970, Twin Circle Publishing broadcast daily radio hits and a weekly half-hour television show espousing Frawley's conservative Catholic views. At that point, he took over publishing the National Catholic Register newspaper, changing its editorial focus from progressive to conservative.

In 1970, Schick became a subsidiary of Warner-Lambert. Also in 1970, Canadian theatre and film producer Harry Saltzman won control of Technicolor from chairman Frawley in a proxy fight.

In 1971, Frawley (on behalf of Schick), along with Charles E. Sellier Jr., and Rayland Jensen founded Schick Sunn Classic Pictures, based in Park City, Utah. The company produced independent feature films, documentaries, and made-for-television movies; in the period 1977–1982 the company produced a number of television films with the Classics Illustrated brand, including The Time Machine, Donner Pass: The Road to Survival, and The Legend of Sleepy Hollow.

In 1995, Frawley sold the National Catholic Register and (the renamed) Catholic Twin Circle to the Legion of Christ.

Frawley died on November 3, 1998, in Santa Monica, California, leaving behind a sister, two sons, five daughters, and 20 grandchildren.
