= A. David Lewis =

American graphic novel writer and comic book scholar

- Born: Aaron David Lewis; 1977 (age 48–49) Boston, Massachusetts, United States
- Areas: Writer, Editor, Publisher
- Notable works: The Lone and Level Sands Kismet, Man of Fate The Prophet: A Graphic Novel Adaptation

Aaron David Lewis (born 1977 in Boston, Massachusetts) is an American comic book and graphic novel writer. He is also a comics scholar focusing on literary theory, religious studies, and graphic medicine.

He is the founder of the Caption Box comic book imprint. He has also served as an instructor at Georgetown University, Northeastern University, MCPHS, Bentley University, and Boston University (as a teaching fellow for Frank Korom, Stephen Prothero, and Steven T. Katz). Additionally, he has given lectures at conferences such as WizardWorld, San Diego Comic-Con, and the New York Comic-Con, among others. He is an editorial board member for the International Journal of Comic Art under editor John Lent. He was an executive board member for the Comics Studies Society. He has also been involved in several podcasts.

== Early life ==
Lewis was raised in Framingham, Massachusetts. He graduated from Brandeis University with a B.A. in English and Psychology in 1999. He earned his M.A. in English Literature from Georgetown University. He earned his PhD in Religion and Literature from Boston University. He has described himself as a liberal and progressive convert to Islam, though he also notes living "a rather pluralistic, semi-omnistic life" with elements of his Jewish upbringing and congregation with the Unitarian Universalists.

== Career ==
Lewis's 2005 work, The Lone and Level Sands (written by Lewis, and illustrated by Marvin Mann and Jennifer Rodgers), won a Howard E. Day Prize and has been nominated for three Harvey Awards in 2007. His 2002 creation, Mortal Coils, was named one of the winners of the 2003 Cinescape Literary Genre Competition, and in 2004 it was given the Paper Screen Gem Award for Mystery/Suspense. It was republished as a hardcover, color edition by Archaia Comics; Mann and Lewis collaborated again through Archaia with Some New Kind of Slaughter, or Lost in the Flood (and How We Found Home Again): Diluvian Myths from around the World in 2009.

In the late 2006, Lewis started a PhD program studying religion and literature at Boston University. There he also helped organize the "Graven Images: Religion in Comic Books and Graphic Novels Conference" and co-edit its later text Graven Images: Religion in Comic Books and Graphic Novels published in 2010. He completed his PhD in 2012 and revamped his dissertation work into the book American Comics, Literary Theory, and Religion: The Superhero Afterlife published in 2014 by Palgrave Macmillan.

In 2011, Lewis became co-editor of Muktatafaht: A Middle East Comics Anthology initially through the Harvard University Center of Middle East Studies' Outreach Center but, due to administrative circumstances, shopped elsewhere. He is also the organizer of the Chain World Freeform Comics Experiment and its customized book The Tome, and, in 2014, a founding member of Sacred and Sequential, an organization of religion & comics scholars.

In 2015, Lewis's co-edited volume with Christopher Moreman, entitled Digital Death: Mortality and Beyond in the Online Age, was a winner of the Ray at Pat Browne Award for "Best Edited Collection", and his American Comics, Literary Theory, and Religion: The Superhero Afterlife was nominated for "Best Scholarly/Academic Work" in the Will Eisner Comic Industry Awards.

In 2017, Lewis edited and contributed to essays on Islamic representation and Muslim characters in superhero comic books and graphic novels.

In a 2018 interview with Nicholas Yanes of Sequart Organization, Lewis stated that his next work would focus on an academic manuscript of the depictions of cancer battles in comics, to tentatively be called: Cancer in Comic Books. That later become condensed as chapters in Keywords/Keyimages in Graphic Medicine and his own Body, Soul, and Comics: Graphic Religion and Graphic Medicine.

During the pandemic, Lewis launched the Graphic Medicine Review, the first journal dedicated to the field of graphic medicine. The open access, online publication originated at the MCPHS University Library and subsequently moved in 2023 to the Lamar Soutter Library at the UMass Chan Medical School under the co-editorship of Mary Piroun.

In 2023, he was named as one of the six national judges for that year's Eisner Awards.

On July 1, 2025, Lewis announced that he had received a promotion to Associate Professor of English and Health Humanities at MCPHS University. That same year, Lewis joined a team of co-organizers in staging the New England Graphic Medicine Summit on Longwood Avenue in Boston. Likewise, on July 2, 2026, Lewis also announced that he would be assuming the role of Director for the Health Humanities major at MCPHS University.

== Controversy ==
Lewis has posted publicly about the challenges in having his 2026 article "'Futurity Itself': The Expansiveness of Pictorial Embodiment in Transgender and Non-Binary Graphic Memoirs" published for over a year-and-a-half. The issue did not seem to originate with the Studies in Comics journal in which it eventually appeared but, instead, with an earlier, unnamed publication source or site.

== Nonprofit work ==
Lewis was the founder and president of Comics for Youth Refugees Incorporated Collective (CYRIC), a 501(c)(3) nonprofit organization in Massachusetts dedicated to producing free comic books based in Syrian folklore for refugee children. By 2019, the organization had sent over 1000 copies of their Haawiyat anthologies overseas to camps and schools along the Turkish border in partnership with NuDay Syria (for which Lewis was also a board member).

On January 14, 2026, it was announced that Lewis would join the board of the Graphic Medicine International Collective as Treasurer.

== Comics bibliography ==
- "Alabaster Cities" in 9-11: Emergency Relief (Alternative Comics, 2001)
- Mortal Coils (Red Eye Press & Caption Box, 2002–2005)
- The Lone and Level Sands (with art by Marvin Perry Mann and Jennifer Rodgers, Caption Box, 2005; Archaia Studios Press, 2006)
- Empty Chamber (with art by Jason Copland, Silent Devil Entertainment, 2007)
- "Res Libero" in Postcards: True Stories That Never Happened (with art by Danielle Corsetto, Villard, 2007)
- Some New Kind of Slaughter, or Lost in the Flood (and How We Found Home Again): Diluvian Myths from Around the World (with writing and art by Marvin Perry Mann, Archaia Studios Press, 2008)
- Kismet, Man of Fate (with art by Noel Tuazon, colors by Rob Croonenborghs, and letters by Taylor Esposito, A Wave Blue World, 2017–2022)
- The Prophet: A Graphic Novel Adaptation (with art by Justin Rentería), Graphic Mundi, 2023, an adaptation of The Prophet by Kahlil Gibran

== Scholarly bibliography ==
- Graven Images: Religion in Comic Books and Graphic Novels as co-editor with Christine Hoff Kraemer (Continuum, 2010)
- Digital Death: Mortality and Beyond in the Online Age as co-editor with Christopher Moreman (Praeger, 2014)
- American Comics, Literary Theory, and Religion: The Superhero Afterlife (Palgrave, 2014)
- Muslim Superheroes: Comics, Islam, and Representation as co-editor with Martin Lund (Mizan, 2017)
- Body, Soul, and Comics: Graphic Religion and Graphic Medicine (University Press of Mississippi, 2026)
