= The Brave Little Tailor =

German fairy tale

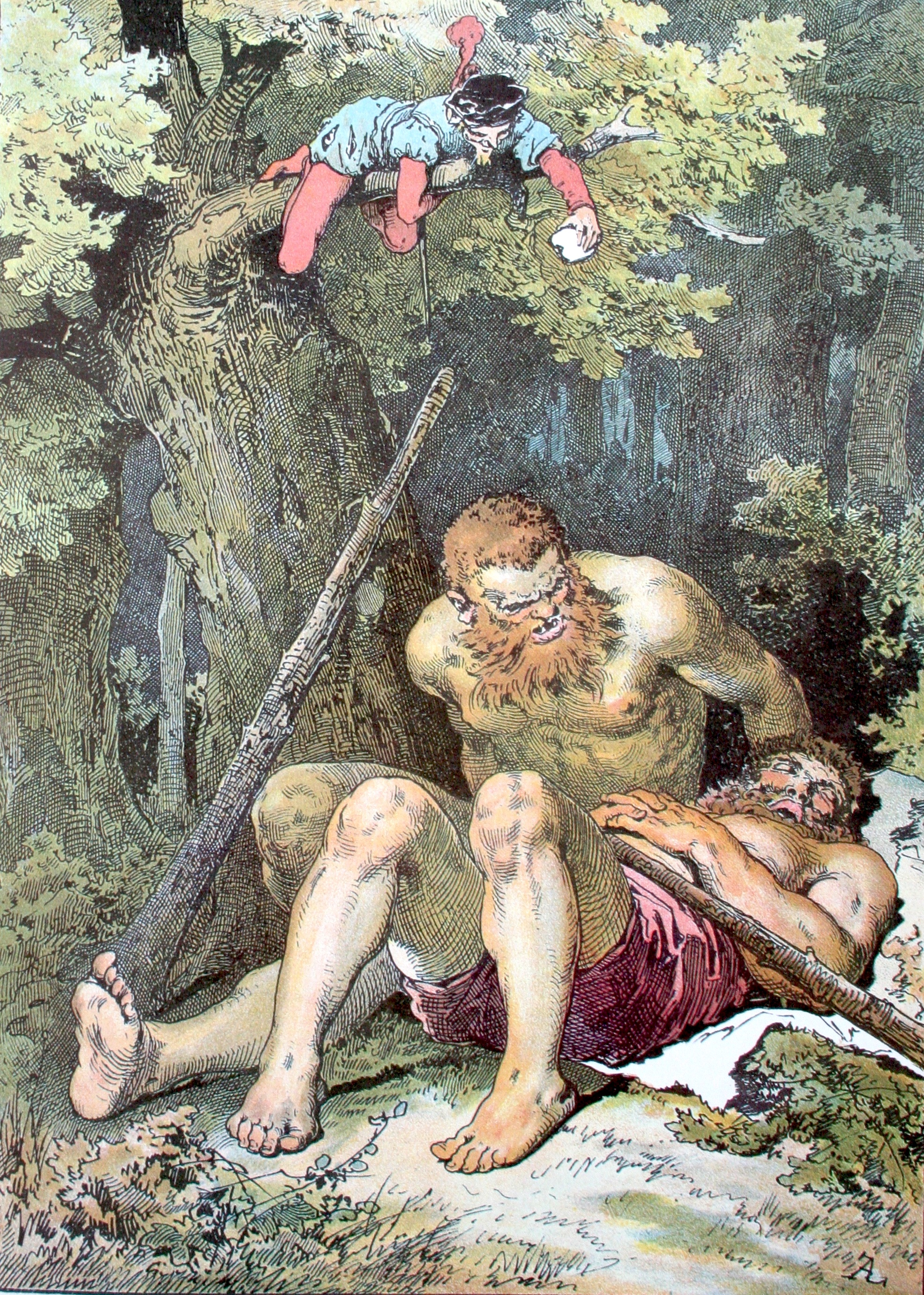
- The tailor provokes the giants. Illustration by Alexander Zick

Folk tale
- Name: The Brave Little Tailor
- Also known as: The Valiant Little Tailor
- Aarne–Thompson grouping: ATU 1640 (The Brave Tailor)
- Country: Germany
- Published in: Grimm's Fairy Tales
- Related: "Jack and the Beanstalk", "Jack the Giant Killer", "The Boy Who Had an Eating Match with a Troll"

"The Brave Little Tailor" or "The Valiant Little Tailor" or "The Gallant Tailor" (German: Das tapfere Schneiderlein) is a German fairy tale collected by the Brothers Grimm (KHM 20). "The Brave Little Tailor" is a story of Aarne–Thompson Type 1640, with individual episodes classified in other story types.

Andrew Lang included it in The Blue Fairy Book. The tale was translated as Seven at One Blow. Another of many versions of the tale appears in A Book of Giants by Ruth Manning-Sanders.

It is about a tailor who tricks many giants and a ruthless king, into believing in his incredible feats of strength and bravery, leading to him winning wealth and power.

== Origin ==
The Brothers Grimm published this tale in the first edition of Kinder- und Hausmärchen in 1812, based on various oral and printed sources, including Der Wegkürzer (c. 1557) by Martinus Montanus.

== Synopsis ==
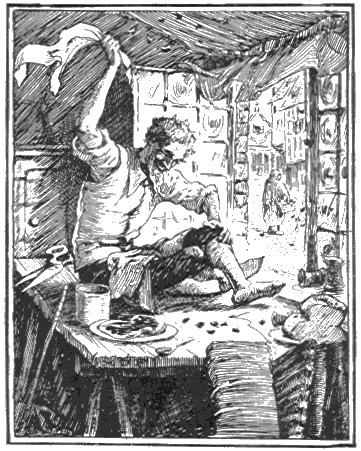
The tailor prepares to squash the flies. Illustration from Andrew Lang's The Blue Fairy Book (1899).

A tailor is preparing to eat some jam, but when flies settle on it, he kills seven of them with one blow of his hand. He makes a belt describing the deed, reading "Seven at One Blow". Inspired, he sets out into the world to seek his fortune. The tailor meets a giant who assumes that "Seven at One Blow" refers to seven men. The giant challenges the tailor. When the giant squeezes water from a boulder, the tailor squeezes milk, or whey, from cheese. The giant throws a rock far into the air, and it eventually lands. The tailor counters the feat by tossing a bird that flies away into the sky; the giant believes the small bird is a "rock" which is thrown so far that it never lands. Later, the giant asks the tailor to help him carry a tree. The tailor directs the giant to carry the trunk, while the tailor will carry the branches. Instead, the tailor climbs on, so the giant carries him as well, but it appears as if the tailor is supporting the branches.

Impressed, the giant brings the tailor to his home, where other giants live as well. During the night, the giant attempts to kill the tailor by smashing the bed with an iron bar. However, the tailor, having found the bed too large, had slept in the corner. Upon returning and seeing the tailor still alive, the other giants flee in fear of the small man.

The tailor enters the royal service, but the other soldiers are afraid that he will lose his temper and then seven of them might die with every blow. They tell the king that either the tailor leaves military service or they will. Afraid of being killed for sending him away, the king instead attempts to get rid of the tailor by sending him to fight two giants along with a hundred horsemen, offering him half his kingdom and his daughter's hand in marriage if the tailor can kill the giants. By throwing rocks at the two giants while they sleep, the tailor provokes the pair into fighting each other until they are both killed, after which the tailor stabs them in their hearts.

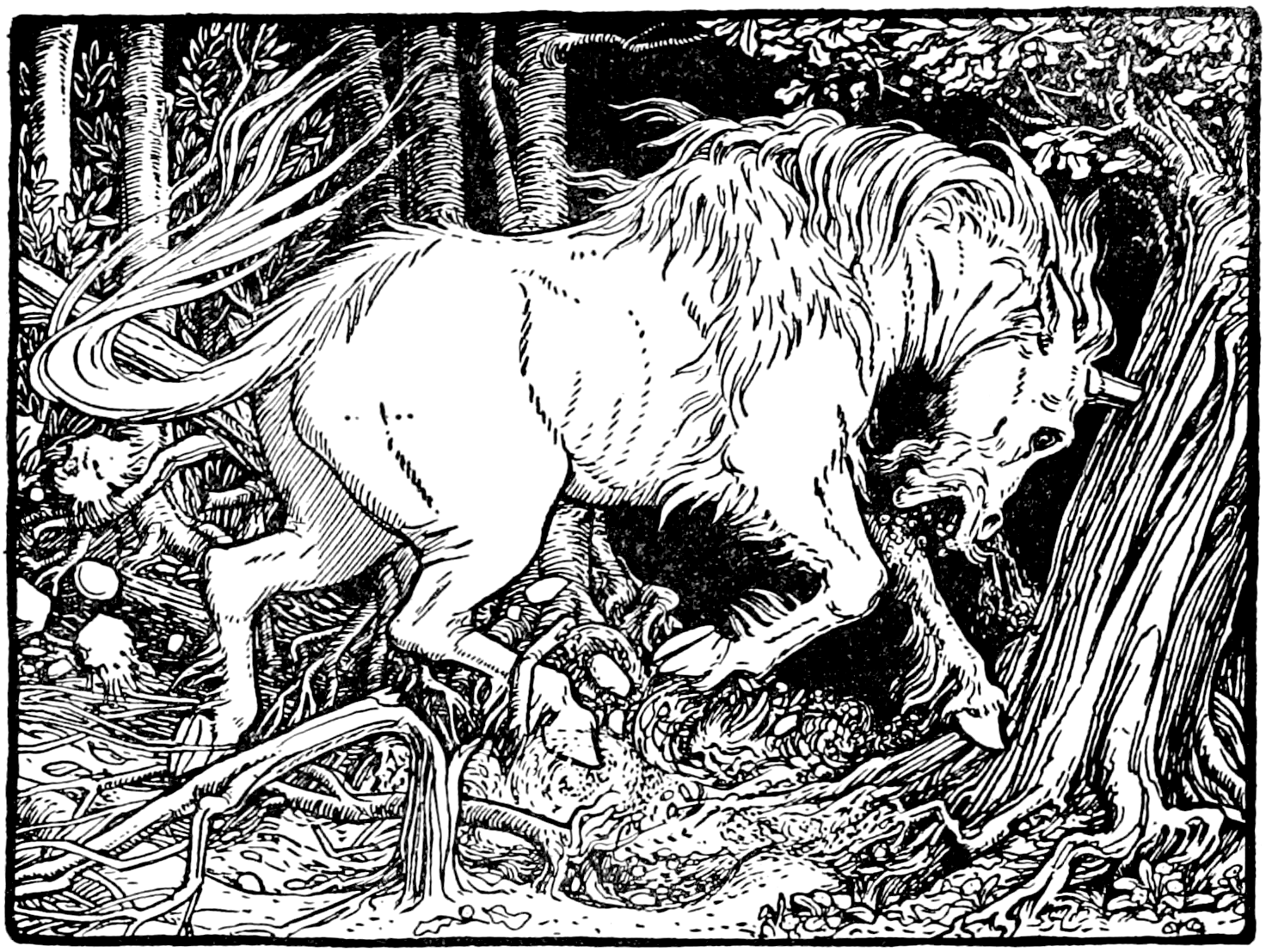
The ferocious unicorn trapped in the tree. Illustration by John Batten for Joseph Jacobs's Europa's Fairy Book (1916).

The king, surprised the tailor has succeeded, reneges on his promise and requires more of the tailor before he can claim his rewards. The king next sends him after a unicorn, another seemingly impossible task, but the tailor traps it by standing before a tree and when the unicorn charges, he steps aside and it drives its horn into the trunk. The king subsequently sends him after a wild boar, but the tailor traps it in a chapel with a similar luring technique.

Duly impressed, the king relents, marries the tailor to the princess and makes him the ruler of half the original kingdom. The tailor's new wife hears him talking in his sleep and realizes with fury that he was merely a tailor and not a noble hero. Upon the princess's demands, the king promises to have him killed or carried off. A squire warns the tailor of the king's plan. While the king's servants are outside the door, the brave little tailor pretends to be talking in his sleep and says "Boy, make the jacket for me, and patch the trousers, or I will hit you across your ears with a yardstick! I have struck down seven with one blow, killed two giants, led away a unicorn, and captured a wild boar, and I am supposed to be afraid of those who are standing just outside the bedroom!" Terrified, the king's servants leave. The king does not try to kill the tailor again, who lives out his days as a king in his own right.

== Analysis ==
In the Aarne–Thompson–Uther system of folktale classification, the core of the story is motif type 1640, named The Brave Tailor for this story. It also includes episodes of type 1060 (Squeezing Water from a Stone); type 1062 (A Contest in Throwing Stones); type 1052 (A Contest in Carrying a Tree); type 1051 (Springing with a Bent Tree); and type 1115 (Attempting to Kill the Hero in His Bed).

"The Brave Little Tailor" has close similarities to other folktales collected around Europe, including "The Boy Who Had an Eating Match with a Troll" (Norway) and "Stan Bolovan" (Romania). It also shares many elements with "Jack the Giant Killer" (Cornwall and England, with ties to "Bluebeard" folktales of Brittany, and earlier Arthurian stories of Wales), though the protagonist in that story uses his guile to actually kill giants. Both the Scandinavian and British variants feature a recurring stock character fairy-tale hero, respectively: Jack (also associated with other giant-related stories, such as "Jack and the Beanstalk"), and Askeladden, also known as Boots. It is also similar to the Greek myth of Hercules in which Hercules is promised the ability to become a god if he slays the monsters, much like the main character in "The Brave Little Tailor" is promised the ability to become king through marrying the king's daughter if he kills the beasts in the story.

The technique of tricking the later giants into fighting each other is identical to the technique used by Cadmus, in Greek mythology and a related surviving Greek folktale, to deal with the warriors who sprang up where he sowed dragon's teeth into the soil. In the 20th-century fantasy novel The Hobbit, a similar strategy is also employed by Gandalf to keep three trolls fighting amongst themselves, until the rising sun turns them to stone.

=== Variants ===
Folklorist Joseph Jacobs, in European Folk and Fairy Tales (or Europa's Fairy Book) tried to reconstruct the protoform of the tale, which he named "A Dozen at One Blow".

In the English version of the story collection Grimm's Goblins: Grimm's Household Stories, the story of The Brave Little Tailor and another one of the Brothers Grimm's story, The Young Giant, are combined as one story called The Young Giant And The Tailor.

==== Europe ====
A variant has been reported to be present in Spanish folktale collections, specially from the folktale compilations of the 19th century. The tale has also been attested in American sources.

A scholarly inquiry by Italian Istituto centrale per i beni sonori ed audiovisivi ("Central Institute of Sound and Audiovisual Heritage"), produced in the late 1960s and early 1970s, found twenty-four variants of the tale across Italian sources.

A Danish variant, Brave against his will ("Den tapre Skrædder"), was collected by Jens Christian Bay.

Joseph Jacobs located an English version from Aberdeen, named Johnny Gloke, which was first obtained by Reverend Walter Gregor with the name John Glaick, the Brave Tailor and published in The Folk-Lore Journal. Jacobs wondered how the Grimm's tale managed to reach Aberdeen, but he suggests it might have originated from an English compilation of the brothers' tales. The tale was included in The Fir-Tree Fairy Book.

Irish sources also contain a tale of lucky accidents and a fortunate fate that befalls the weaver who squashes the flies in his breakfast: The legend of the little Weaver of Duleek Gate (A Tale of Chivalry). The tale was previously recorded in 1846 by Irish novelist Samuel Lover.

In the Hungarian tale Százat egy ütéssel ("A Hundred at One Blow"), at the end of the tale, the tailor mumbles in his sleep about threads and needles, and his wife, the princess, hears it. When confronted by his father-in-law, the tailor dismisses any accusations by saying he visited earlier a tailor's shop in the city.

A Russian variant collected by Alexander Afanasyev, called "The Tale of the Bogatyr Gol' Voyanskoy" (the name roughly translatable as "poor warrior") has a peasant kill a number of horse-flies and mosquitoes bothering his horse. After that, he goes to adventure on said horse after leaving a message about his "deed" carved into a tree, inviting other heroes to join him. After being joined by Yeruslan Lazarevich, Churilo Plyonkovich and Bova Korolevich, the four defeat the defenders of a kingdom ruled by a princess, upon which the peasant drinks the magic water the princess has, becomes a bogatyr for real and marries her.

==== Asia ====
A similar story, Kara Mustapha (Mustafa), the Hero, was collected by Hungarian folklorist Ignác Kúnos, from Turkish sources.

Francis Hindes Groome proposed a parallel between this tale and the Indian story of Valiant Vicky, the Brave Weaver. Valiant Vicky was originally collected by British author Flora Annie Steel from a Punjabi source, with the title Fatteh Khân, Valiant Weaver.

Sometimes the weaver or tailor does not become a ruler, but still gains an upper station in life (general, commander, prime minister). One such tale is Sigiris Sinno, the Giant, collected in Sri Lanka. Other variant is The Nine-killing Khan.

"The Story of Brave Kong" is a Cambodian variant. The Kong is a coward who relies on his cowives and luck to succeed.

== Character analysis ==
- Tailor – this character is clever, intelligent, and confident. He uses misdirection and other cunning to trick other characters. For example, various forms of psychological manipulation to influence the behavior of others, such as turning the pair of giants against each other, and playing on the assassins' and the earlier giants' assumptions and fears. Similarly, he uses decoy tactics to lure the quest animals (unicorn, boar) into his traps, and to avoid being killed in the first giant's bed. This reliance on trickery and manipulation by the protagonist is a feature of the stock character of the antihero.
- King – this character is very mistrusting and judgmental, who uses the promise of half the kingdom to persuade the protagonist to take on seemingly deadly tasks. The king is one-dimensional as a character, and is essentially a plot device, the source of challenges for the protagonist to overcome to achieve the desired goal.
- Princess – the prize for completing all these challenges is the hand in marriage of the princess, and along with it, half the kingdom. She sets great store by the social class of royal birthright, so when she finds out that the man she has married is no more than a poor tailor, she is furious, and tries to have him killed. Her self-absorbed vindictiveness, and its easy defeat, is consistent with the stock character of the shrewish bride.

== Adaptations ==
- Mickey Mouse appeared in a 1938 short cartoon, Brave Little Tailor, based on this tale.
- Tibor Harsányi composed a suite, L'histoire du petit tailleur, for narrator, seven instruments, and percussion in 1950. One of the most famous recordings of this work was performed by the Orchestre de la Société des Concerts du Conservatoire conducted by Georges Prêtre, with Peter Ustinov as the narrator reading in both English (Angel Records, 1966) and French (Pour les Enfants, EMI Classics France, 2002).
- The story formed an episode of the second season of Grimm's Fairy Tale Classics, a 1987–1989 anime television series.
- The Valiant Little Tailor was featured in the first season of Happily Ever After: Fairy Tales for Every Child, a 1995–2000 HBO animated TV series, where it was set in the West African Sahel. The tailor was called Bongo and was voiced by David Alan Grier and also featured the voice talents of James Earl Jones as King Dakkar, Mark Curry as the Giant, Dawnn Lewis as Princess Songe, and Zakes Mokae as an exclusive character named Mr. Barbooska.
- Le vaillant petit tailleur is a 2004 French-language novel by Éric Chevillard retelling the fairy tale in a postmodernist way.
- "Satmaar Palowan" ("The Wrestler Who Kills Seven"), a short story by Bengali writer Upendrakishore Ray Chowdhury, was inspired by this tale.
- A Soviet cartoon based on the fairy tale was produced in 1964, directed by the Brumberg sisters.
- This story is adapted in the 1999 animated series Simsala Grimm.
- In the game Fairytale Fights, he acts as the main antagonist who is stealing all the fame and glory from four fable characters (Little Red Riding Hood, Snow White, Beanstalk Jack, and The Naked Emperor) by stalking them throughout the game and lets them do all the life-threatening hard work before swooping in after every victory to steal the prize and claim the credit for himself. His fame was short-lived after the heroes defeated him and exposed his storybook to the fairytale village that he's a fraud. The Tailor tried to escape, but was flattened and killed by the father giant who dropped the heroes' books on top of him and took his book; this resulted of the heroes' fame finally being restored and the villagers cheering them on.
