= Stan Bolovan =

Romanian fairy tale

Folk tale
- Name: Stan Bolovan
- Mythology: Romanian
- Country: Romania

Stan Bolovan is a Romanian fairy tale collected in Rumänische Märchen by Mite Kremnitz (1882). Fairy tale collector Andrew Lang included it in his The Violet Fairy Book (1901). Versions of the tale were later retold by Ruth Manning-Sanders in A Book of Dragons (1965) and A Choice of Magic (1971), and by Christopher Rawson in The Usborne Book of Dragons (1979).

== Synopsis ==
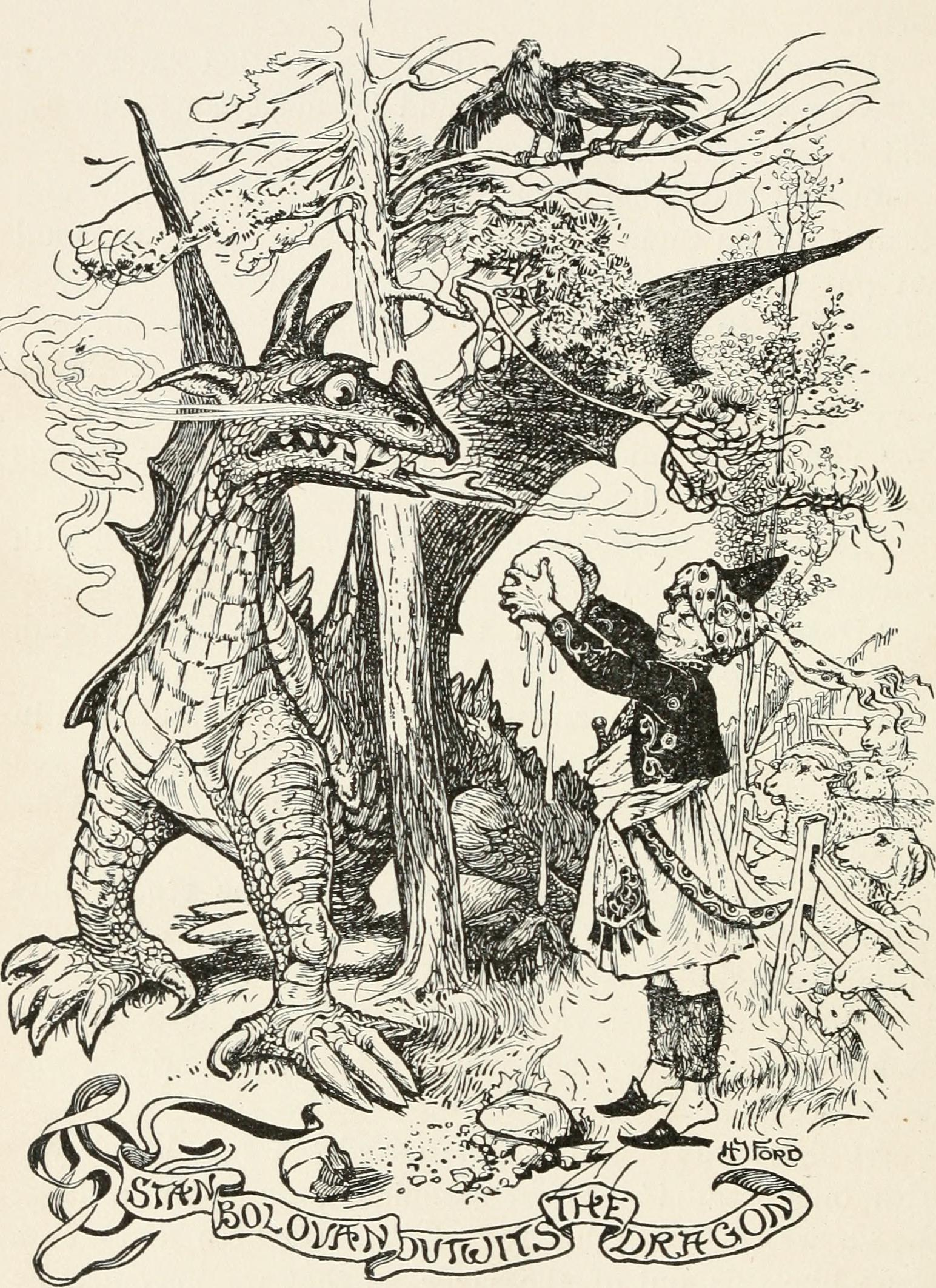
Illustration from Andrew Lang's Fairy Books

Stan Bolovan's wife was sad, though they were prosperous. Finally, she confessed that she was grieved that they had no children. Stan visited a wise man and begged him for children, and ignored his warnings about feeding them all. He returned to find his wife delighted: they had a hundred children. Soon, they found they could not feed them all, and Stan set out to find food. He found a flock of sheep and hoped to steal some, but a dragon stole animals and milk from the flock. He asked, and the shepherds promised him a third of the flock if he rid them of the dragon. He met up with the dragon and said he ate rocks by night and flowers by day and would fight. He set a contest: he squeezed buttermilk from cheese, and the dragon tried to squeeze it from a rock, and had to own he was better. The dragon offered him service with his mother, who would pay him sacks of ducats. The mother set them two trials: her son threw a staff as far as he could, and then it was Stan's turn. First, he told the dragon he was afraid that he would kill him with the force; then he claimed to be waiting until the moon got out of the way. The mother then sent them to fetch water, and Stan could not have carried the skins she sent, but when he said it was too much bother and threatened to carry the stream instead, the dragon carried them for him. The mother then sent them to gather wood, and Stan started to tie trees together, declaring he would carry back the entire wood, and the dragon brought back wood for him, before he uprooted the forest. The mother told her son to crack open his head in the night. Stan hid under a pig's trough and was not harmed. They gave him gold to go away, which he could not carry, but he said he wanted to stay in her service, because his friends would be ashamed of him, to carry so little; they urged him to go, and he went on the condition that the dragon carry back the gold for him. He did not want to go all the way home with the dragon, so that it would not know where he lived, but his hungry children came running, and were so hungry they shouted for the dragon's flesh. Terrified, the dragon dropped the gold and ran away, leaving Stan and his family to prosper with it.

== Fairy Tales with Similar Elements ==
- The Boy Who Had an Eating Match with a Troll
- The Valiant Little Tailor
