= Faith & Family =

- Editor: Danielle Bean
- Categories: Catholic magazine
- Frequency: Bi-monthly
- Publisher: Bayard, Inc.
- Founded: 1967 (as Twin Circle); 2000 (as Faith & Family)
- Final issue: 2011
- Company: Bayard
- Country: United States
- Based in: New London, Connecticut
- Language: English
- Website: www.faithandfamilylive.com
- ISSN: 1099-923X

Faith & Family was a bi-monthly periodical about Catholic living, with a particular emphasis on marriage and motherhood. Launched in 1967 as Twin Circle, the magazine was renamed Faith & Family in 2000; it folded in 2011. The headquarters of Faith & Family was in New London, Connecticut.

Faith & Family Magazine received the Catholic Press Association's "Best General Interest Magazine" award six years in a row (from 2002 to 2007).

== Publication history ==
Twin Circle was founded as a weekly newspaper by Patrick Frawley's Twin Circle Publishing Co. in 1967. At some point, it changed its name to Catholic Twin Circle, and was sold to the Legion of Christ in 1995.

Circle Media acquired the biweekly Catholic Twin Circle and renamed it Faith & Family. In 2000 it was restarted in the magazine format and began to be published on a bimonthly basis.

The online version of the magazine was launched in August 2008 and featured a daily blog with posts about food, culture, health, family life, and life in the Church.

The French Roman Catholic media group Bayard, Inc. acquired the magazine from Circle Media in February 2011. Soon after Faith & Family was acquired, Bayard shut it down. Faith & Family's last editor by Danielle Bean; Bean was moved over to a relaunched Catholic Digest (also owned by Bayard, Inc.).
