= Boots and His Brothers =

Norwegian fairy tale

Boots and His Brothers (Norwegian: Per, Pål og Espen Askeladd) is a Norwegian fairy tale collected by Peter Christen Asbjørnsen and Jørgen Moe in their Norske Folkeeventyr.

== Synopsis ==
A king had his castle shadowed by a great oak tree, and had no well that held water year round. He declared that whoever cut down the oak and dug the well would have the princess and half the kingdom.

Three brothers, who had set out because their father was too poor to give them anything, were going to his palace. The youngest son heard something hewing, and went off. He found an axe that was hewing by itself, and it said that it had been waiting for him. He took it and went back, telling his brother that it had been an axe, and endured their ridicule. Again, he heard something digging, found a shovel digging by itself, and took it as well; then he wondered where a brook came from, and found not a spring but a walnut, which he stopped up with moss.

When they reached the king, he had decreed that whoever tried and failed to cut down the oak and dig the well would have his ears clipped off and be put on a deserted island. The two older tried, failed, and suffered the punishment. The youngest set the axe to cut down the tree, the spade to dig the well, and the nut to fill it.

The story says that it was just as well that the brothers lost their ears, because it spared them hearing people's comments that their youngest brother had not been a fool to wonder.

== Translations ==
A German language translation of the tale was Peter und Paul und Esben Aschenbrödel - Aschenbrödel usually referring to a male Cinderella.

== Analysis ==
=== Tale type ===
The tale is classified in the international Aarne-Thompson-Uther Index as type ATU 577, "The King's Tasks". Its original name is also the title of the tale type in Norway, according to scholar Ørnulf Hodne's The Types of the Norwegian Folktale.

=== Variants ===
Folklorist Stith Thompson stated that the tale type was "popular" in Norway, but also "confined to that country". Hodne's catalogue listed 22 variants of the tale type in Norway.

== See also ==
- Boots and the troll
- Boots Who Made the Princess Say, "That's a Story"
