= Ding Dong Bell =

English language nursery rhyme

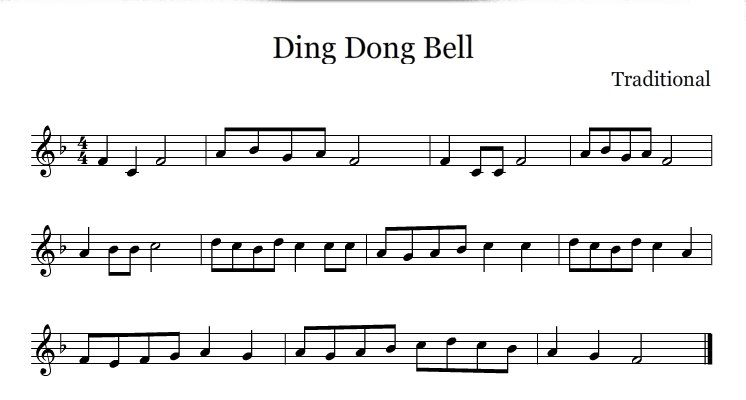
- Sheet music

Nursery rhyme
- Published: 1580
- Songwriter: Traditional

"Ding Dong Bell" or "Ding Dong Dell" is a popular English language nursery rhyme. It has a Roud Folk Song Index number of 12853.

The nursery rhyme tells the story of a naughty boy who throws a cat into a well. The rhyme starts with the sound of bells ringing (“Ding Dong Bell”) to grab attention. It then describes how the cat was thrown into the well by a mischievous child (often named Johnny Green), but is later rescued by a kind boy (Tommy Stout). The rhyme serves as a moral lesson, teaching children not to be cruel to animals and that such actions are wrong. The rescue part emphasizes kindness and taking responsibility to correct bad actions.

== Words ==
Ding Dong Bell
Tune for Ding Dong Bell

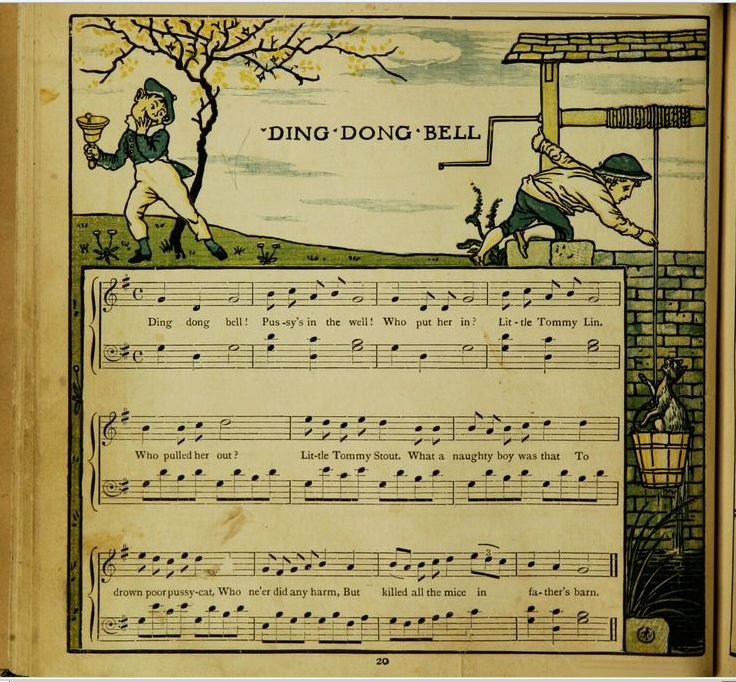
Ding Dong Bell song on a page from The Baby's Opera: A book of old Rhymes and The Music by the Earliest Masters

One modern version, cited by The Oxford Dictionary of Nursery Rhymes, is:

Ding dong bell,
Pussy’s in the well.
Who put her in?
Little Johnny Green.
Who pulled her out?
Little Tommy Stout.
What a naughty boy was that,
To try to drown poor pussy cat,
Who never did him any harm,
But killed the mice in his farmer's barn.

== Origins ==
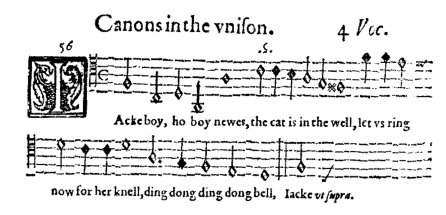
The verse printed in Thomas Ravenscroft's Pammelia, Musicks Miscellanie (1609) as a canon for four voices

The earliest recorded reference to the rhyme is from John Lant, the organist of Winchester Cathedral in 1580, who recorded the following rhyme:

Jacke boy, ho boy newes,
The cat is in the well,
Let us ring now for her Knell,
Ding dong ding dong Bell.

It was printed in Thomas Ravenscroft's Pammelia, Musicks Miscellanie in 1609, as a canon for four voices.

The phrase 'Ding, dong, bell' also appears in these passages of Shakespeare's plays:

The Tempest, Act I, Scene II:

Sea nymphs hourly ring his knell:
Hark! Now I hear them – Ding, dong, bell.

The Merchant of Venice, Act III, Scene II:

Let us all ring fancy's knell;
I'll begin it – Ding, dong, bell.

The earliest version to resemble the modern one is from Mother Goose's Melody published in London around 1765. The additional lines that include (arguably) the more acceptable ending for children with the survival of the cat are in James Orchard Halliwell's Nursery Rhymes of England, where the cat is pulled out by "Dog with long snout".

Several names are used for the malevolent Johnny Green, including Tommy O' Linne (1797) and Tommy Quin (c. 1840). Iona and Peter Opie suggested that it may have had its origins in Tom a lin or Tom o' Lin, the protagonist of another nursery rhyme.

== William Stonard's composition ==
There is also a version composed as a four-part round by William Stonard (1585–1630) to the following text:

Ding, ding, ding dong bell, ding, ding, ding, ding dong bell.
Oh cruel death that stopped the breath of him I loved so well.
Alack and well away 'tis a heavy day that ever us befell.
Then for his sake some order let us take that we may ring his knell.

== Reformed versions ==
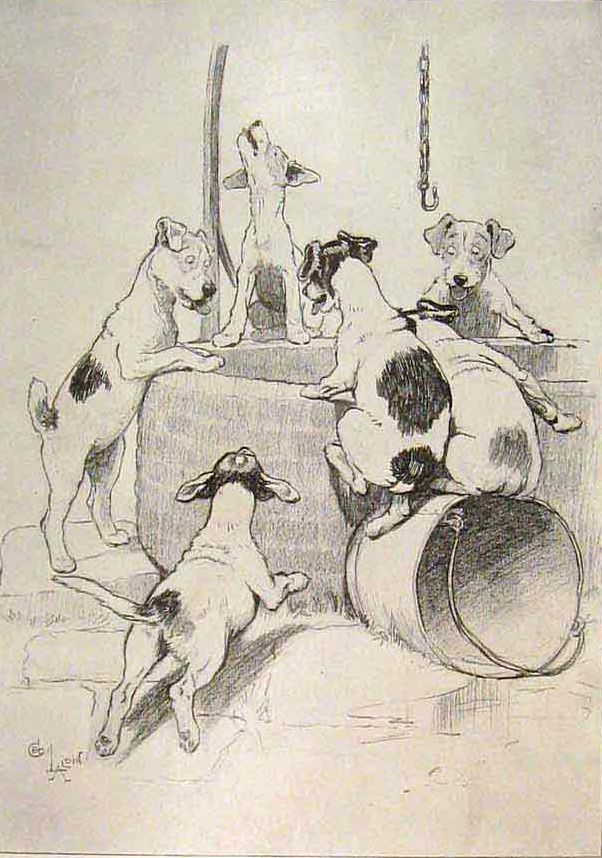
Illustration of the rhyme from an issue of The Illustrated London News (1905)

The most common modern version is arguably already a moderation of the theme of the original rhyme. The fear that children might be affected by the violence of the rhyme and specifically that children might be tempted to put cats in wells, led to several attempts to reform the rhyme. In his New Nursery Rhymes for Old (1949) Geoffrey Hall published the following alternative:

Ding dong bell
Pussy's at the well
Who took her there?
Little Johnny Hare.
Who'll bring her in?
Little Tommy Thin.
What a jolly boy was that
To get some milk for pussy cat
Who ne'er did any harm
But played with the mice in
His father's barn.
