= Boots Who Made the Princess Say, "That's a Story" =

Norwegian fairy tale

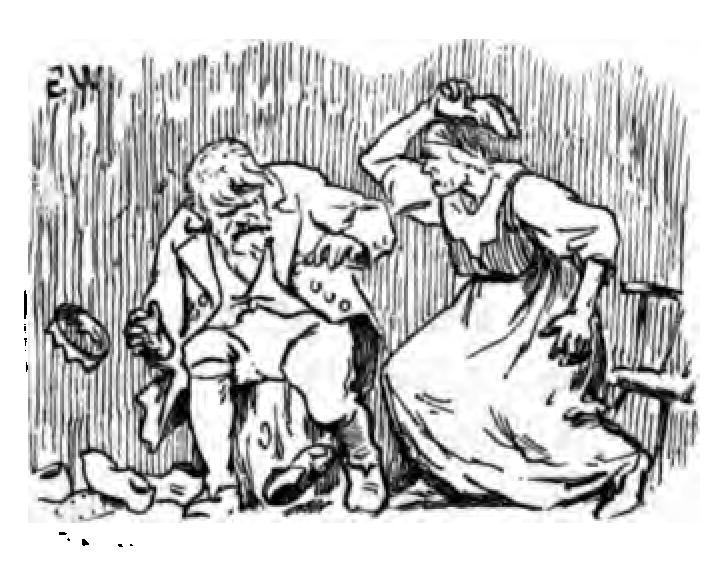

Folk tale
- Name: Boots Who Made the Princess Say, "That's a Story"
- Also known as: The Ash Lad Who Made the Princess Say, "You're a Liar"
- Aarne–Thompson grouping: 852
- Country: Norway
- Published in: Norske Folkeeventyr

"Boots Who Made the Princess Say, 'That's a Story'" or "The Ash Lad Who Made the Princess Say, 'You're a Liar'" is a Norwegian fairy tale collected by Peter Christen Asbjørnsen and Jørgen Moe in Norske Folkeeventyr.

It is Aarne–Thompson type 852.

== Synopsis ==
A princess was a constant liar. The king said that anyone who got her to say "That's a lie" would marry her and get half the kingdom. After many had tried, three brothers did as well, and when it was the turn of the youngest son (named Boots in some versions, or Askeladden 'Ash-lad', in others), he traded lies with her: The princess claimed a farmyard too large for a man at one end to hear the horn blown at the other end; the son that a just bred cow that crossed their farmyard would give birth at the other side, and on with more tall tales until the son claimed he had seen her father and his mother cobbling, and his mother boxed her father's ears.

"That's a lie!" said the Princess; "my father never did any such thing in all his born days!"

== Variant ==
Baroness Emma Orczy, of The Scarlet Pimpernel fame, translated a Hungarian variant of the story in her book Old Hungarian Fairy Tales, titled "That's Not True!" (Hungarian: "Az már nem igaz!"). In this version, it is the king who reacts to the absurd story the peasant tells.

== See also ==
- Boots and His Brothers
- Boots and the troll
- Boots Who Had an Eating Match with a Troll
