= Penny Publications =

American magazine publisher

- Logo of Penny Publications.
- Founded: 1973; 53 years ago in Stamford, Connecticut
- Founders: William E. Kanter and Penny Kanter
- Country of origin: United States
- Headquarters location: 6 Prowitt Street, Norwalk, Connecticut
- Key people: Peter Kanter
- Publication types: Magazines, books
- Nonfiction topics: Crosswords, puzzles
- Fiction genres: Mysteries
- Imprints: Penny Press; Crosstown Publications; Dell Magazines
- Official website: pennypublications.com

Penny Publications, LLC is an American magazine publisher specializing in puzzles, crosswords, sudokus as well as mystery and science fiction magazines. Penny Publications publishes over 85 magazines distributed through newsstands, in stores, and by subscription in the United States and Canada. Penny Publications' headquarters are in Norwalk, Connecticut, and their printing office is located in Loudon, New Hampshire.

== History ==
Penny Publications was founded in 1973 in Stamford, Connecticut, by the husband-and-wife team of William E. "Bill" Kanter and Penny Kanter. Bill Kanter was the son of Albert Kanter (1897–1973), founder of the Gilberton Company, formerly the publisher of Classics Illustrated. (Note: The Gilberton name was retired in 1967, when the Classics Illustrated brand was sold to Patrick Frawley.) The Kanters combined the remaining Gilberton assets with a struggling crossword publisher to form Penny Press and Crosstown Publications. The parent company was named after Penny. In an homage to Classics Illustrated, one of the company's first titles was Classic Crosswords.

In March 1996, Penny Publications acquired Dell Magazines, founded in 1921 by George T. Delacorte, Jr. Dell Magazines, later popularly known for its science fiction and mystery magazines, had also from early on published puzzle magazines, including crossword games, beginning in 1931 with Dell Crossword Puzzles. Dell Crossword Puzzles, Official Crossword Puzzles, and Pocket Crossword Puzzles have all been published continuously for more than 60 years.

Beginning in 2001, by arrangement with Three Across, Penny Publications has offered "New York Times style" crosswords to membership groups such as The Crosswords Club, The Large-Print Crosswords Club, and The Uptown Puzzle Club.

In early 2010, Penny Publications renewed its agreement with Comag Marketing Group LLC for sale, marketing, and distribution of all of its titles, both under Penny Press and under Dell Magazine brands, in the U.S., Canada, and elsewhere.

In 2025, Penny Publications sold Alfred Hitchcock's Mystery Magazine, Ellery Queen's Mystery Magazine, Asimov's Science Fiction and Analog Science Fiction and Fact to Must Read Magazines, a division of a new publishing company, Must Read Books Publishing.

== Magazines and imprints published ==
Magazines and imprints published by Penny Publications include:

* Crossword
- Dell Collector's
- Dell Crossword Puzzles
- Dell's Best Easy Crosswords
- Family Favorites
- Family Variety Puzzles & Games
- Fill-In
- Logic and Math
- Official Crossword Puzzles
- Original Logic Problems
- Original Sudoku
- Penny Press Selected Series
- Penny's Finest Word Seeks
- Pocket Crossword Puzzles
- Sudoku
- Tournament Variety Puzzles
- Variety (not to be confused with Variety magazine)
- Will Shortz' WordPlay
- Word Seek
- Word Search
