= The Sea-Hare =

German fairy tale

Folk tale
- Name: The Sea-Hare
- Aarne–Thompson grouping: ATU 554
- Country: Germany
- Published in: Grimms' Fairy Tales

"The Sea-Hare" is a German fairy tale collected by the Brothers Grimm, number 191.

It is Aarne-Thompson type 554, The Grateful Animals, and similar to 851, Winning the Princess with a Riddle.

Stith Thompson classified the tale as AT 329, "Hiding from the Devil (Princess)", tales where the hero must hide from the princess's mirror or windows that can peer into the whole world.

== Synopsis ==
A princess had a magical tower with twelve windows, and whenever she looked from a window, she saw more clearly from it than the one before. Being haughty, she had no wish to marry, and decreed that any suitor must hide from her to win her, but if she found him, he was to lose his head. After ninety-seven lost their lives, three brothers presented themselves, and the first two lost. The youngest son asked for three tries. He went hunting and spared a raven, a fish, and a fox. The raven tried to hide him in an egg, where he could be seen only from the eleventh window. The fish swallowed him, where he could be seen only from the twelfth. The fox turned him into a pretty "sea-hare" (an uncertain mammal rather than the present-day sea snail) and sold him to the princess. When she went to the windows, he hid in her hair. She could not see him, and angrily threw the sea-hare out of her hair. He sneaked off, the fox restored him, he went to claim her, and they married.

== Adaptations ==
Two Hungarian variants of the tale were adapted into episodes of the Hungarian television series Magyar népmesék ("Hungarian Folk Tales") (hu), with the titles Zöld Péter ("Green Peter") and Kiskondás ("The Little Swineherd").

== See also ==
- The White Snake
- The Riddle (fairy tale)
