= Laila Alawa =

American entrepreneur and researcher (born 1991)

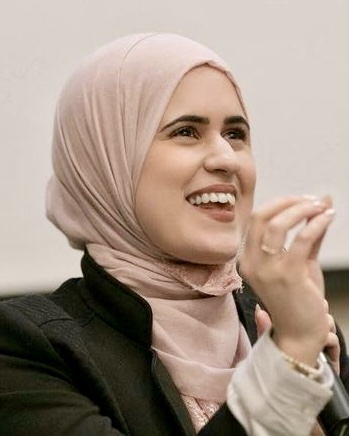
- Born: 17 August 1991 (age 34); Ishøj, Denmark
- Education: Wellesley College
- Website: www.lailaalawa.com

Laila Alawa (born 1991) is a Syrian-American entrepreneur, psychology researcher, and writer. Her work on examining gendered stereotypes in STEM led to results displaying continued issues in discrimination and prejudice against women in STEM fields. She is recognized by The New York Times as an innovator for her global media and entertainment company, The Tempest. In 2018, Alawa was named to Forbes 30 Under 30 lists In America and Europe.

== Personal life ==
Alawa spent early years of her life living in Japan, where her father studied engineering, after moving from her original birthplace, Denmark - her mother's native land. As a child, Alawa then moved to the United States with her five younger siblings and parents. The Alawa family moved from Upstate New York to Berkley, Massachusetts following the events of 9/11. Alawa's mother was an educated woman with a degree in pedagogy, and chose to homeschool her children. She eventually received her American citizenship in 2015.

Alawa is a practicing Muslim woman and has remarked on the struggles she has faced experiencing Islamophobia. She has remarked, "I've grown up as a visible Muslim, with people spitting on me, yelling at me, harassing me."

== Career ==
Alawa began her post-graduate career working on examining socio-cognitive processing at Princeton University. Following her work at Princeton, she moved to Washington, DC, and explored digital branding, journalism, and communications work. During that time, she also worked on Capitol Hill.

She decided to found the beta version of The Tempest, using research principles from her time at Princeton University. She also felt that she and other diverse millennial women were not represented by mainstream media. After she left her full-time digital branding job, Alawa began working at The Tempest full-time.

== Research ==
Alawa studies organizational leadership, social interactions, and stereotypes in real-world contexts. In particular, she is interested in the unconscious assessments of oneself and others, resulting in in-group and out-group classifications.

At Wellesley College, Alawa worked on examining the effects of stereotypes as possible gendered obstacles to women in science.

Later published in the Psychology of Women Quarterly, the study established that overlap in perceptions was due to stereotypes about the agency and communion of women, men, and scientists.

To date, the findings have been used in more than 200 studies exploring STEM and gendered representation, as well as the World Bank Group and Parliament of the United Kingdom to seek support for STEM education initiatives.

== The Tempest ==
While originally focused on personal essays and editorials exploring gender and ethnic equality, the media platform gained new attention when it began incorporating perspectives of more than 1200 thought-leaders from more than 90 countries, including subjects such as the cultural stigma of abortion in South Africa and university protests against Richard Spencer. The Tempest launched internationally at South by Southwest in March 2016.

By November 2019, there were more than 8 million unique visitors each month, according to comScore.

In 2016, Alawa managed a collaboration with Voxe, a French NGO that created a system for comparing the platforms of political candidates to help voters.

Posts on the outlet's Facebook and Twitter pages stopped around October 2021, and the website is no longer accessible, with no explanation provided.
