= Blockhead Hans =

Fairy tale by Hans Christian Andersen

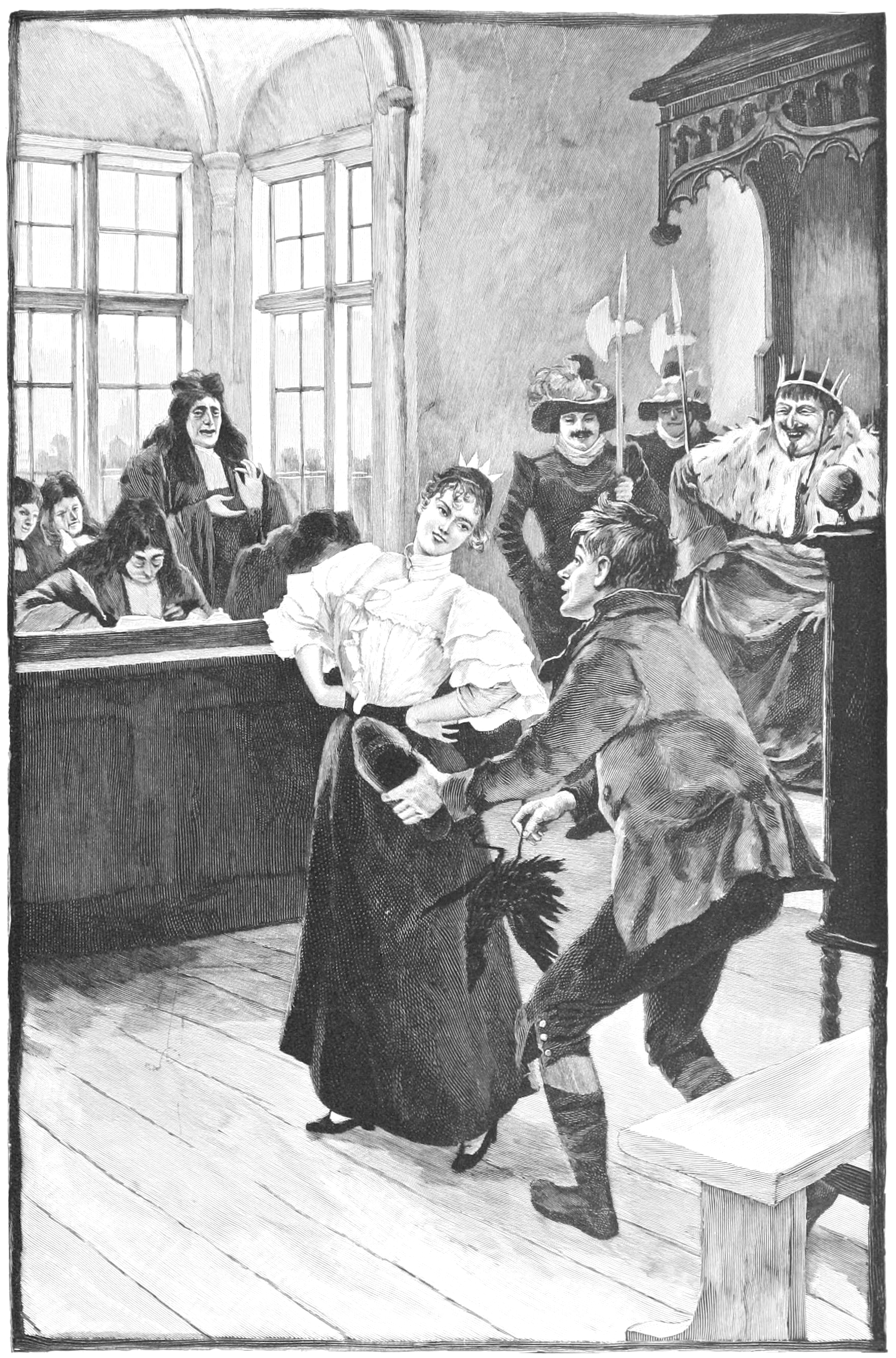
1900 illustration by Hans Tegner

"Blockhead Hans" (Danish: Klods-Hans) is a literary fairy tale by Hans Christian Andersen. It was first published in Danish in 1855. An early English translation (as "Blockhead Hans") appeared in Andrew Lang's 1894 The Yellow Fairy Book, although Lang gave no source for the tale. The tale has been variously translated as "Clumsy Hans", "Silly Hans" and "Jack the Dullard". It is number 119 in the Hans Christian Andersen Centre's register of Andersen's literary works.

== Story ==
The two educated sons of an old squire want to marry the princess, who has said that she would marry the man who chose his words best. They study hard to speak well, and their father gives them each a horse to ride to the King's hall. A third, much less intelligent son called Blockhead-Hans wants to win the princess as well, but his father will not give him a horse, so he rides a goat, instead.

On the way to the King's hall, Blockhead-Hans picks up gifts to give to the princess: a dead crow, an old wooden shoe without the top, and mud. At the King's throne, three reporters and an editor stand by each window. They write down what each of the many suitors says, to publish later. The fireplace is very hot, and each suitor is failed by the princess. Both brothers stammer and fail to impress the princess with their words. Blockhead-Hans rides his goat into the royal hall, and remarks about the heat. The princess replies that she is roasting young roosters, meaning the suitors. "That's good!" replies Blockhead-Hans; "then can I roast a crow with them," taking out the dead crow. The Princess approves and asks Blockhead if he also has something to cook it in. He produces the shoe, calling it "a cooking implement with tin rings," and places the dead crow in it. The princess approves and asked where the soup is. Blockhead-Hans pours mud on the crow. She likes him and decides to marry him. The princess tells him that the reporters are writing down everything he said to be published. Blockhead says, "Then I will give the editor my best," and throws mud in the editor's face. Blockhead-Hans marries the princess and later becomes king.

== See also ==
- Andrew Lang's Fairy Books
