= Grundmann =

Grundmann is a surname. Notable people with the surname include:

- Arthur Grundmann (1920–1987), German politician
- Emil Otto Grundmann (1844–1890), German painter who studied in Antwerp under Baron Hendrik Leys, later moving to America
- Erhard Grundmann, German luger from Czechoslovakia
- Erich Grundmann (1906–1973), Knight's Cross of the Iron Cross recipient during World War II
- Oliver Grundmann (born 1971), German politician
- Susan Tsui Grundmann, American attorney
- Walter Grundmann (1906–1976), German Protestant theologian during the Third Reich and DDR
- Wolfgang Grundmann (born 1948), member of the Red Army Faction
- Reiner Grundmann (born 1955), German sociologist

== See also ==
- Grundmann aldehyde synthesis, chemical reaction that produces an aldehyde from an acyl halide
- Grundman (surname page)
