= Classics Illustrated =

American comic book series

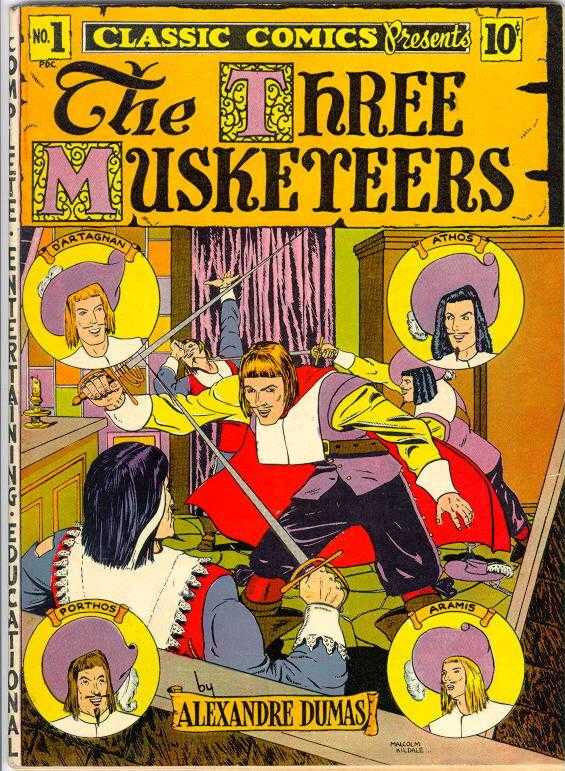
- Three Musketeers, issue #1, Classic Comics, published in 1941

Publication information
- Publisher: Elliot Publishing Co. (1941–1942); Gilberton Company, Inc. (1942–1967); Frawley Corporation (Twin Circle) (1967–1971)
- Format: Ongoing series
- Publication date: 1941 – 1969
- No. of issues: 169

Creative team
- Created by: Albert Kanter
- Artist(s): Lillian Chestney, Henry C. Kiefer, Jack Abel, Matt Baker, Dik Browne, Lou Cameron, Sid Check, L.B. Cole, Reed Crandall, George Evans, Denis Gifford, Graham Ingels, Alex Blum, Everett Raymond Kinstler, Jack Kirby, Roy Krenkel, Gray Morrow, Joe Orlando, Norman Nodel, Norman Saunders, John Severin, Joe Sinnott, Angelo Torres, Al Williamson, George Woodbridge

Classics Illustrated is an American comic book/magazine series featuring adaptations of literary classics such as Les Misérables, Moby-Dick, Hamlet, and the Iliad. Created by Albert Kanter, the series began publication in 1941 and finished its first run in 1969, producing 169 issues. Following the series' demise, various companies reprinted its titles. Since then, the "Classics Illustrated" brand has been used to create new comic book adaptations. This series is different from the Great Illustrated Classics, which is an adaptation of the classics for young readers that includes illustrations, but is not in the comic book form.

== 1941–1971: Elliot / Gilberton ==
Recognizing the appeal of early comic books, Russian-born publisher Albert Lewis Kanter (1897–1973) believed he could use the new medium to introduce young and reluctant readers to "great literature". He created Classic Comics for Elliot Publishing Company in 1941 with its debut issues being The Three Musketeers, followed by Ivanhoe and The Count of Monte Cristo. The first five titles were published irregularly under the banner "Classic Comics Presents", while issues #6 and 7 were published under the banner "Classic Comics Library" with a ten-cent cover price. Arabian Nights (issue #8), illustrated by Lillian Chestney, is the first issue to use the "Classics Comics" banner.

With the fourth issue, The Last of the Mohicans, in 1942, Kanter moved the operation to different offices, and the corporate identity was changed to the Gilberton Company, Inc. Reprints of previous titles began in 1943. World War II paper shortages forced Kanter to reduce the 64-page format to 56 pages. Some titles were packaged in gift boxes of threes or fours during the period, with specific themes such as adventure or mystery.

Classic Comics is marked by varying quality in art and is celebrated today for its often garish but highly collectible line-drawn covers. Original edition Classic Comics in "near mint" condition command prices in the thousands of dollars.

With issue #35 in March 1947 (The Last Days of Pompeii) the series' name was changed to Classics Illustrated. In 1948, rising paper costs reduced books to 48 pages. In 1951 (issue #81), line-drawn covers were replaced with painted covers, and the price was raised from 10 cents to 15 cents (and, at a later date, to 25 cents).

Classics Illustrated benefitted from nationwide distribution (thanks to an agreement with Curtis Circulation) beginning in late 1951, and Kanter began promoting the series as an educational tool. Despite this, Dr. Jekyll and Mr. Hyde (issue #13) and Uncle Tom's Cabin (issue #15) were both cited in Dr. Fredric Wertham's 1954 condemnation of comic books Seduction of the Innocent, in the first case for reducing the story to little more than its violent elements, and in the second case for simplifying the full characterizations of the book to stereotypes.

Classics Illustrated #65 — Benjamin Franklin (published in November 1949) — written by Adelaide Lee (adaptation) and illustrated by Alex Blum, Robert Hebberd, and Gus Schrotter, was given the 1956 Thomas Alva Edison Foundation National Mass Media Award for Best American History Comic Book.

As Classics Illustrated became more standardized in the 1950s, Gilberton re-issued earlier editions with new art (and sometimes new script adaptations). All editions were re-issued with new cover art in the 1950s and '60s.

In addition to Classics Illustrated, Kanter presided over its spin-offs Classics Illustrated Junior (1953), Classics Illustrated Special Issue (1955), and The World Around Us (1958). Between 1941 and 1962, sales totaled 200 million copies.

Of the original 169 issues of Classic Comics/Classics Illustrated produced in the period 1941–1969, the writers with the most representation included Jules Verne, with ten works adapted; Alexandre Dumas, with nine; James Fenimore Cooper, with eight; and Robert Louis Stevenson, with seven. Charles Dickens, Walter Scott, William Shakespeare, Mark Twain, and H. G. Wells were all well-represented, with five works adapted each. Seven female authors had their work adapted. Up through 1951, all adaptations were from work in the public domain. Beginning in 1952, the series occasionally created authorized adaptations of popular 20th-century fiction by such authors as Charles Nordhoff and James Norman Hall (four of their novels), Frank Buck (two of his novels), Charles Boardman Hawes (two novels), Erich Maria Remarque, Talbot Mundy, Walter Van Tilburg Clark, and Emerson Hough.

In addition to the literary adaptations, each issue of Classics Illustrated featured author profiles, educational fillers, and an advertisement for the coming title. In later editions, a catalog of titles and a subscription order form appeared on back covers.

The publication of new titles in the U.S. ceased in 1962 for various reasons. The company lost its second-class mailing permit; and cheap paperbacks, Cliff's Notes, and television drew readers away from the series. Kanter's last new title was issue #167 Faust (August 1962), though other titles had been planned. Two of these titles – an adaptation of G. A. Henty's In Freedom's Cause, and the original title, Negro Americans: The Early Years – appeared in the company's foreign editions. In addition, in 1962–1963, the British publisher Thorpe & Porter, which at that point was owned by Gilberton, produced 13 new issues of Classics Illustrated, which were never published in the U.S. Most of the script adaptations were done by Classics Illustrated editor Alfred Sundel.

In 1967, Kanter sold his company to Twin Circle Publishing Co. and its conservative Catholic publisher Patrick Frawley, whose Frawley Corporation in 1969 finally published In Freedom's Cause and Negro Americans, but mainly concentrated on foreign sales and reprinting older titles. After four years, Twin Circle discontinued the line because of poor distribution, and licensed the rights to other companies until it sold the rights to First Classics, Inc. in 2011.

=== Writers and artists ===
The work of adapting the source material and writing comics scripts was done by a group of mostly unknown writers. Alfred Sundel, a long-time editor on the series, scripted more than 20 first-edition adaptations and more than 10 revised editions. Others with a lot of script adaptation credits include Ken Fitch (sometimes credited as "Kenneth W. Fitch") with 22 issues, Harry G. Miller (sometimes credited as "Harry Glickman") with twelve, Evelyn Goodman with nine, and John O'Rourke with nine. Other writers with multiple adaptations to their names included Ruth Roche, George Lipscomb, Annette T. Rubenstein, and Sam Willinsky.

Henry C. Kiefer was the main artist for many issues of Classic Comics and Classics Illustrated, and his work came to define the "look" of the series. For Classic Comics, he illustrated the second cover for The Prince and the Pauper, issue #29, cover for The Adventures of Sherlock Holmes, issue #33, and the first Classics Illustrated issue The Last Days of Pompeii, issue #35. For Classics Illustrated, he drew the majority of at least 20 issues from the series in the period 1947–1953. Alex Blum also illustrated more than 20 issues of the series in the period 1948–1955. Norman Nodel illustrated more than 20 issues of Classics Illustrated (a number of them being re-issues with new art).

Other artists who contributed to Classic Comics include Lillian Chestney (Arabian Nights, issue #8, and Gulliver's Travels, issue #16), Webb and Brewster (Frankenstein, issue #26), and Matt Baker (Lorna Doone, issue #32). Oliver Twist (issue #23) was the first title produced by the Eisner & Iger shop.

Other notable artists who drew multiple issues of Classics Illustrated included George Evans, Lou Cameron, Reed Crandall, Pete Costanza, L.B. Cole, John Severin, Gray Morrow, and Joe Orlando. Lesser-known names with multiple credits include Rudy Palais, Arnold Hicks, Maurice Del Bourgo, Louis Zansky, August Froehlich, and Bob Webb, Jack Abel, Stephen Addeo, Charles J. Berger, Dik Browne, Denis Gifford, Roy Krenkel, John Parker, Norman Saunders, Joe Sinnott, Al Williamson and George Woodbridge.

=== Classics Illustrated Junior ===
Classics Illustrated Junior featured Albert Lewis Kanter's comic book adaptations of fairy and folk tale, myth and legends. In 1953, Classics Illustrated Junior debuted with Snow White and the Seven Dwarfs; the line eventually numbered 77 issues, ending publication in 1971. Issues included miscellanea such as an Aesop fable and a full-page illustration to color with crayons. Artists included John Costanza and Kurt Schaffenberger.

=== Classics Illustrated Special Issue ===
Despite numbering that aligns with the main Classics Illustrated title, Classics Illustrated Special Issue is generally regarded as a separate title; instead of adaptations, subjects were historical or biographical. Published in December and June from December 1955 to 1964, issues were generally 100 pages long — twice the size of a typical Classics Illustrated. Notable artists included Angelo Torres, Bruno Premiani, Don Perlin, Edd Ashe, Everett Kinstler, George Evans, Gerald McCann, Graham Ingels, Gray Morrow, Jack Kirby & Dick Ayers, Joe Orlando, John Tartaglione, Norman Nodel, Pete Morisi, Reed Crandall, Sam Glanzman, and Sid Check.

== 1990–1991: First Comics ==
Classics Illustrated

Publication information
- Publisher: First Comics
- Format: Ongoing series
- Publication date: Feb. 1990 – June 1991
- No. of issues: 27

Creative team
- Artist(s): Kyle Baker, Pat Boyette, Rick Geary, Gary Gianni, Peter Kuper, Tom Mandrake, Dean Motter, Mike Ploog, P. Craig Russell, Bill Sienkiewicz, John K. Snyder III, Dan Spiegle, Joe Staton, Jill Thompson, Ricardo Villagran, Gahan Wilson
- Editor(s): Wade Roberts (issues #1–17), Valarie Jones (issues #18–25), Byron Erickson (issues #26–27)

In 1988 First Comics partnered with Berkley Publishing to acquire the rights, and announced it was reviving the Classics Illustrated brand with all-new adaptations. In 1990 (after some delays), Classics Illustrated returned after a nearly 30-year hiatus, with a line-up of artists that included Kyle Baker, Dean Motter, Mike Ploog, P. Craig Russell, Bill Sienkiewicz, Joe Staton, Rick Geary and Gahan Wilson.

The line lasted only a little over a year, publishing 27 issues. Titles solicited but never published were Kidnapped, Twenty Thousand Leagues Under the Seas, The Red Badge of Courage, The War of the Worlds, Around the World in Eighty Days, and The Last of the Mohicans. Kidnapped, adapted by Mike Vosburg, was later published by Papercutz in 2012.

== 1997–1998: Acclaim Books ==
In 1997–1998, Acclaim Books (the successor to Valiant Comics) published a series of recolored reprints of the Gilberton issues in a digest size format with accompanying study notes by literary scholars. The Acclaim line included Mark Twain's Adventures of Huckleberry Finn, with art by Frank Giacoia; and The Three Musketeers, illustrated by George Evans. The series favored Mark Twain, also with reprints of Pudd'nhead Wilson, The Prince and the Pauper and Tom Sawyer. Other reprints in this series were Fyodor Dostoyevsky's Crime and Punishment, Herman Melville's Moby-Dick and Nathaniel Hawthorne's The House of the Seven Gables. The series lasted 62 issues, with three of the final four issues being all-new adaptations.

== 2008–2014: Papercutz ==
In 2007, Papercutz acquired the Classics Illustrated license and announced that they would begin publishing new graphic novels ("Classics Illustrated Deluxe") as well as reprints of the First Comics series from 1990 to 1991. The new modern adaptations were largely produced in France; Papercutz published 12 volumes – including The Wind in the Willows, Frankenstein, Treasure Island, and The Adventures of Tom Sawyer – from 2008 to 2014.

The First Comics reprint series of adaptations was published by Papercutz in a different order from the originals and emphasized some of the later, low-circulation volumes. 19 issues were published (out of the original 27) from 2008 to 2014.

== 1989–present: First Classics, Inc. ==
First Classics, Inc., formed in 1989, eventually took over management of the Classics Illustrated rights licensed to First Publishing (formerly First Comics) by the Frawley Corporation.

Starting in 2002, First Classics enlisted Jack Lake Productions (JLP) of Canada to produce Classics Illustrated and Classics Illustrated Junior books based on the original Gilberton lineup, many of them remastered by JLP.

In August 2011, First Classics purchased the rights to the Classics Illustrated family of books from Frawley Corporation.

In 2020, First Classics and Jack Lake Productions settled their long-running dispute over the rights to Classics Illustrated. Some main outcomes of the settlement were that Jack Lake Productions and the artists involved with the CI book remastering will be cited in books that use the remastered art, and reaffirmation of First Classics as the rights holder to Classics Illustrated.

Through the years, First Classics worked with Trajectory, Inc. to license Classics Illustrated throughout the world, and also to create and make available many titles in the Classics Illustrated family of books in e-book format. First Classics currently publishes these e-books. Classics Illustrated continues to be published throughout the world in various languages through license from First Classics. In English, Classic Comic Store (CCS Books) of the UK re-publishes much of the Classics Illustrated lineup.

== Digital editions ==
In 2011, Marblehead, Massachusetts-based Trajectory Inc. issued the first digital editions of Gilberton Classics Illustrated regular and Junior lines. In 2014, Trajectory Inc. was granted the exclusive worldwide rights to produce, distribute and license the brand. The primary rights-holder for the digital editions is First Classics, Inc.

== International editions ==
| Country | Publisher | Classics Illustrated native name | Publication start | Publication end | Issues | Notes | Source |
|---|---|---|---|---|---|---|---|
| Australia | Ayers & James | Classic Comics (later Classics Illustrated) | 1947 | 1953 | 72 | | |
| Brazil | Editora Brasil-América Limitada | Edição Maravilhosa | 1948 | 1961 | 200 | | |
| Canada | Gilberton | Classics Illustrated | 1948 | 1951 | 78 | | |
| Canada | Jack Lake Productions | Classics Illustrated | 2003 | 2013 | 86 | | |
| Denmark | I.K. | Illustrerede klassikere | 1956 | 1974 | 227 | In 1969, I.K. began publishing Stjerneklassiker ("Star Classics"), featuring more Classics Illustrated reprints; this series was continued beginning in 1970 by the successor to I.K., Williams lasting until 1974. | |
| France | Williams France | Les classiques illustrés | 1973 | 1974 | 15 | | |
| Germany | Internationale Klassiker | Illustrierte Klassiker | 1956 | 1972 | 204 | Publisher later became Bildschriftverlag (BSV). BSV was acquired by National Periodical Publications (DC Comics) in 1966. In October 1973, the publisher became Williams (independent of BSV), with its headquarters on Elbchaussee in Hamburg. | |
| Germany | Norbert Hethke Verlag | Illustrierte Klassiker | 1991 | 2002 | 206 | Reprints of German I.K./BSV/Williams versions | |
| Germany | BSV Hannover | Illustrierte Klassiker | 2015 | present | 36 | Revived the title with issue #206; it continues to the present day | |
| Greece | Ekdóseis Pechlivanídi (Ατλαντίς / Πεχλιβανίδης) | Klassiká Eikonografiména (Κλασσικά Εικονογραφημένα) | 1951 | 1990 | 806 | Three separate series (1951–1970, 1975–1980, 1989–1990); many reprints of their own publications, but also created 90 original adaptations of Greek myths and stories | |
| Iceland | Gudmundar Karlsson | Sígildar Sögur | 1956 | 1957 | 26 | | |
| India | H. R. Publications | Classics Illustrated | 1994 | 1994 | 42 | | |
| Italy | Editrice il Picchio | I Classici Illustrati | 1979 | 1979 | 8 | | |
| Mexico | Editora de Periódicos La Prensa | Clásicos Ilustrados | 1951 | 1973 | 182 | Some new covers for the Mexican audience | |
| Netherlands | Classics | Illustrated Classics | 1956 | 1976 | 214 | Publisher founded as a European branch of Gilberton. The company changed names to "Williams" in the early 1970s; most of its remaining titles were acquired by Kontekst in 1979. | |
| Norway | Serieforlaget | Illustrerte Klassikere | 1954 | 1976 | 229 | Series acquired in 1957 by Illustrerte Klassikere, another European branch of Gilberton; later renamed Williams Forlag | |
| Philippines | G. Miranda & Sons | Famous Classics Illustrated | 1971 | 1972 | 26 | Although the logo design and covers emulated the original series, much of the content seems to have been original. Its serial numbering differs. | |
| Portugal | Empresa Nacional de Publicidade (ENP) | Obras-Primas Ilustradas | 1955 | 1964 | 14 | | |
| Sweden | Illustrerade Klassiker | Illustrerade Klassiker | 1956 | 1976 | 549 | Publisher reorganized into Williams Förlags AB in 1965; published many reprints of their own issues. Some early issues, at least, were original Scandinavian adaptations, often written by Alfred Sundel. The art for these was usually from a Spanish studio like Editorial Bruguera, with many covers by Antonio Bernal Romero. | |
| United Kingdom | Thorpe & Porter | Classics Illustrated | 1951 | 1963 | 181 | Produced and published 13 new issues of the series which were never released in the U.S. | |
| United Kingdom | Classic Comic Store | Classics Illustrated | 2008 | present | 87 | | |
| Yugoslavia | Vecernje novosti - Kekec | Novosti za decu - Klasici u stripu | 1968 | 1968 | 21 | | |

=== Brazil ===
In 1948, the Brazilian comic book publisher Brazilian-American Editions, Ltd (EBAL) launched the Marvellous Edition series, which reprinted many issues of Classics Illustrated, and which included original adaptations of Brazilian novels.

In the 1990s, Editora Abril published some stories from the First Comics Classics Illustrated series. In 2010, HQM Editora published Through the Looking-Glass, originally adapted in 1990 by Kyle Baker for the First Comics series.

=== Canada ===
Gilberton published a Canadian version of Classics Illustrated in the period 1948–1951, putting out 78 issues.

In 2003, Toronto's Jack Lake Productions revived Classics Illustrated Junior, creating new remastered artwork from the original editions. In 2005, Jack Lake Productions published a Classics Illustrated 50th-anniversary edition of The War of the Worlds in both hard and softcover versions. In November 2007, Jack Lake Productions published for the first time in North America Classics Illustrated #170 The Aeneid (originally published in the UK) along with issues #1 of The Three Musketeers, #4 of The Last of the Mohicans, and #5 of Moby Dick.

In October 2016, Jack Lake Productions republished under the Classic Comics banner eleven remastered original Gilberton titles:

- #11 Don Quixote
- #14 Westward Ho!
- #17 The Deerslayer
- #20 The Corsican Brothers
- #21 Three Famous Mysteries
- #22 The Pathfinder
- #79 Cyrano de Bergerac
- #122 The Mutineers
- #123 Fang and Claw
- #168 In Freedom's Cause
- #174 Captain Blood – new addition, originally published in Stories by Famous Authors Illustrated #2 (Seaboard Publishing, 1950).

=== Germany ===
The German publisher Internationale Klassiker, later renamed Bildschriftenverlag (BSV), was founded in 1956 to publish translated editions of Classics Illustrated (as Illustrierte Klassiker). The company released 204 issues of the title from 1956 to 1972. BSV was acquired by National Periodical Publications (DC Comics) in 1966. In October 1973, the publisher became Williams (independent of BSV), with its headquarters on Elbchaussee in Hamburg. In 2013, the publisher BSV Hannover revived the title with issue #206; it continues to the present day.

Meanwhile, beginning in 1991 and lasting until 2002, the German publisher Norbert Hethke Verlag reprinted the Illustrierte Klassiker series.

=== Greece ===
In Greece the series is named Κλασσικά Εικονογραφημένα (Klassiká Eikonografiména, meaning "Classics Illustrated") and has been published continuously since 1951 by Εκδόσεις Πεχλιβανίδη (Ekdóseis Pechlivanídi, Pechlivanídis Publications). It is based on the American series, with the difference that well-known Greek illustrators and novelists work to adapt stories of particular Greek interest. In addition to the titles that were translated from the US Classics Illustrated more than 70 titles were published with themes from Greek mythology and Greek history. Κλασσικά Εικονογραφημένα are read by thousands of young Greeks, and the first issues are of interest to collectors.

The publishing house of Κλασσικά Εικονογραφημένα, Εκδόσεις Πεχλιβανίδη (Pechlivanídis Publications), was founded by three brothers of the Πεχλιβανίδης (Pechlivanídis) family from the Greek-speaking parts of Asia Minor: Μιχάλης, Michális, Michael; Κώστας, Kóstas; and Γιώργος, Giórgos, George), collectively known as αδελφοί Πεχλιβανίδη (Pechlivanídis brothers). They had extensive experience in publishing from the 1920s, mainly in advertising – but also in children's books after 1936, when Κώστας Πεχλιβανίδης (Kóstas Pechlivanídis) finished his studies in the – then modern – printing techniques in Leipzig.

The Pechlivanídis brothers had inherited the printing press of Bavarian lithographer Grundman – and his experience as well. Having worked for years with offset printing, the Pechlivanídis brothers founded after the war the Εκδόσεις Ατλαντίς (Atlantis Publications) house in order to restart publishing children's books. They had read Classics Illustrated while traveling in the US, and arranged to publish them in Greece as well.

The first issue of Κλασσικά Εικονογραφημένα was made available on 1 March 1951. It was an adaptation of Victor Hugo's Les Misérables, and attracted extensive critique in Greece, both positive and negative. It was the first "American" kind of comic in Greece and also the first four-color or tetrachromatic offset (with 336 multicolored illustrations as the front page advertised). Its cost at the time was 4,000 drachmas, and the first edition (90,000 copies) went out of print quickly and was reprinted twice in the following days. According to Atlantis, it sold about a million copies.

=== United Kingdom ===
==== Thorpe & Porter / Williams ====
The British publisher Thorpe & Porter published Classics Illustrated reprints (and a few original stories) from 1951 to 1963. Of the 181 British issues, (Note: When reprinting issues, some issues were dropped, resulting in multiple issues, such as two versions of #152.) 13 had never appeared in America. Additionally, there were some variations in cover art.

The British Classics Illustrated adaptation of Dr. No was never published under the U.S. Classics Illustrated line, but instead was sold to DC Comics, which published it in 1963 as #43 in their superhero anthology series, Showcase. The comic followed the plot of the film with images of the film's actors rather than Ian Fleming's original novel.

In 1976–1977, the successor company to Thorpe & Porter, Williams Publishing, released the Double Duo series, which for the first time reprinted translated issues of Classics Illustrated originally published in Swedish (by Illustrerade klassiker / Williams Förlags AB) in the period 1964–1970. Each digest-sized issue contained two stories, coming in at a total of 68 pages per issue. All the stories were illustrated by members of a Spanish comics studio.

==== Classic Comic Store ====
In September 2008, Classic Comic Store, based in the U.K., began publishing both the original Gilberton Classics Illustrated regular and Junior lines for distribution in the U.K., Republic of Ireland, South Africa, Australia and New Zealand. The issue number sequence is different from the original runs, although the Junior series was in the same sequence as the original, but with numbering starting at 1 instead of 501. The covers were digitally 'cleaned up' and enhanced, based on the original US covers. In September 2009, Classic Comic Store Ltd announced that although they would continue to publish the Classics Illustrated titles, they were no longer publishing the Junior series after issue 12, but rather importing the issues from Canada. This meant that the numbers used would be as per the Canadian issues (i.e. the first one imported would be issue 513). In October 2012 (when issue 44 had been dispatched), Classic Comic Store Ltd no longer continued with a subscription service in the UK, because of the costs involved. The company told subscribers that they were planning on producing four issues at a time, but not on a specified time scale. The first of these batches (issues 45–48) was produced in October 2013. The second batch (49, 57–62) was available in August 2016 (although the issues stated "First Published May 2016"). The gap (50–56) was a result of the artwork for them being unavailable to Classic Comic Store in refreshed form, the intention being to publish them at a future date; this was completed by March 2019, after which issues continued to be produced in order from the last previously published issue.

New publications for Classic Comic Store editions:

- July 2011: Nicholas Nickleby (issue #32) became the first new title in the 48-page series since Gilberton's 1969 publication of #169 (Negro Americans: The Early Years). The artwork came from the November 1950 Stories by Famous Authors Illustrated (Seaboard Publishing) edition of Nicholas Nickleby and retained the original Gustav Schrotter interior art. (Note: From the issue's introduction: "Classic Comic Store has now added the [November 1950 Famous Authors Illustrated] edition of Nicholas Nickleby to the Classics Illustrated series as issue No. 32, the first title in the 48-page series since the 1969 publication of No. 169, Negro Americans:The Early Years. Nicholas Nickleby retains the 1950 [Gustav] Schrotter interior art." ("Introduction". Classics Illustrated (UK). No. 32. Classic Comic Store Ltd. June 2011. p. 48.))
- October 2012: The 39 Steps (issue #44) became the second brand-new title to the Classics Illustrated canon.
- September 2013: The Argonauts (issue #48) was published – one of 13 which were never issued in the US collection but only in the UK.
- March 2019: The Aeneid (issue #72) was published – another which was not issued in the original US collection but only in the UK – although in 2007, it was issued in North America as #170.
- March 2019: Through the Looking-Glass (issue 73) was published – this was not issued in the original US collection, but was published in 1990 as #3 in the First Comics run.

===== Expanded World Series Facsimile Series =====
In March 2024, Classic Comic Store started publishing a new series under their Classics Illustrated Joint European Series (JES), which publishes classic stories and true histories from all over the world, available in English for the first time.

Current titles:

- March 2024

1. Stalingrad (originally published in 1962 in Spanish by Editorial Novaro)
2. Dunkirk (originally published in 1962 in Spanish by Editorial Novaro)
3. D-Day: The Normandy Invasion (originally published in 2015 in Spanish by Editorial Novaro)
4. Beowulf (originally published in 1963 in Spanish by Editorial Novaro)

== Issues ==
=== Original Elliot/Gilberton run ===
Authorship is based on William B. Jones Jr.'s Classics Illustrated: A Cultural History, second edition (Jefferson, N.C.: McFarland & Company, Inc., 2002), Appendices A and B; as well as the information held by Michigan State University Libraries Special Collections Division in their Reading Room Index to the Comic Art Collection as well as the Grand Comics Database.

| Issue | Original publication (Note: Publication dates in parentheses indicate a "best guess" by the Grand Comics Database.) | Title | Author | Original adaptation | Original illustrator | Later adaptation | Later illustrator |
Issued as Classic Comics titles
| 1 | October 1941 | The Three Musketeers | Alexandre Dumas, père | Malcolm Kildale | Malcolm Kildale | | George Evans |
| 2 | December 1941 | Ivanhoe | Walter Scott | Albert Kanter | Edd Ashe | | Norman Nodel |
| 3 | March 1942 | The Count of Monte Cristo | Alexandre Dumas, père | | Ray Ramsey; Allen Simon; Vivian Lipman | | Lou Cameron |
| 4 | August 1942 | The Last of the Mohicans | James Fenimore Cooper | | Ray Ramsey | | John Severin; L. B. Cole; Stephen L. Addeo |
| 5 | September 1942 | Moby Dick | Herman Melville | Louis Zansky | Louis Zansky (with Harvey Kurtzman) | | Norman Nodel |
| 6 | October 1942 | A Tale of Two Cities | Charles Dickens | Evelyn Goodman | S. M. Zuckerberg (as "Stanley Maxwell Zuckerberg") | Annette T. Rubenstein | Joe Orlando (with George Evans) |
| 7 | December 1942 | Robin Hood | (Uncredited; based in part on Merry Adventures of Robin Hood by Howard Pyle) | Evelyn Goodman | Louis Zansky and Fred Eng | Annette T. Rubenstein? | Jack Sparling |
| 8 | February 1943 | Arabian Nights | --- | Alfred Sundel | Lillian Chestney; Charles Berger | Alfred Sundel | Charles Berger |
| 9 | March 1943 | Les Misérables | Victor Hugo | Evelyn Goodman | R. H. Livingstone | Alfred Sundel | Norman Nodel |
| 10 | April 1943 | Robinson Crusoe | Daniel Defoe | Evelyn Goodman | S. M. Zuckerberg (as "Stanley Maxwell") | | Sam Citron; Charles Sultan |
| 11 | May 1943 | Don Quixote | Miguel de Cervantes | Samuel Abramson | Louis Zansky | — | – |
| 12 | June 1943 | Rip Van Winkle and the Headless Horseman | Washington Irving | Dan Levin | R. H. Livingstone (as "Rolland Livingstone") | | Norman Nodel |
| 13 | August 1943 | Dr Jekyll & Mr Hyde | Robert Louis Stevenson | Evelyn Goodman | Arnold Hicks | | Lou Cameron |
| 14 | September 1943 | Westward Ho! | Charles Kingsley | Daniel Kushner | Allen Simon | — | — |
| 15 | November 1943 | Uncle Tom's Cabin | Harriet Beecher Stowe | Evelyn Goodman | R. H. Livingstone | — | — |
| 16 | December 1943 | Gulliver's Travels | Jonathan Swift | Daniel Kushner | Lillian Chestney | — | — |
| 17 | January 1944 | The Deerslayer | James Fenimore Cooper | Evelyn Goodman | Louis Zansky | — | — |
| 18 | March 1944 | The Hunchback of Notre Dame | Victor Hugo | Alfred Sundel | Evelyn Goodman | Alfred Sundel | Reed Crandall and George Evans |
| 19 | April 1944 | Huckleberry Finn | Mark Twain | Evelyn Goodman | Louis Zansky | — | Mike Sekowsky & Frank Giacoia |
| 20 | June 1944 | The Corsican Brothers | Alexandre Dumas, père | Stephen Burrows | Allen Simon | — | — |
| 21 | July 1944 | Three Famous Mysteries (The Sign of the Four, "The Murders in the Rue Morgue," "The Flayed Hand") | Arthur Conan Doyle/Edgar Allan Poe/Guy de Maupassant | Dan Levin | Louis Zansky; Allen Simons; Arnold Hicks | — | — |
| 22 | October 1944 | The Pathfinder | James Fenimore Cooper | Evelyn Goodman | Louis Zansky | Alfred Sundel (unpublished) | Norman Nodel (unpublished) |
| 23 | July 1945 | Oliver Twist | Charles Dickens | Georgina Campbell | Arnold Hicks | Alfred Sundel | Reed Crandall and George Evans |
| 24 | September 1945 | A Connecticut Yankee in King Arthur's Court | Mark Twain | Ruth Roche and Tom Scott | Jack Hearne | | Jack Sparling |
| 25 | October 1945 | Two Years Before the Mast | R. H. Dana Jr. | Ruth Roche | Bob Webb (as "Robert Hayward Webb") and David Heames | — | — |
| 26 | December 1945 | Frankenstein | Mary W. Shelley | Ruth Roche | Bob Webb (as "Robert Hayward Webb") and Ann Brewster | — | — |
| 27 | April 1946 | The Adventures of Marco Polo | Marco Polo; Donn Byrne | Emanuel Demby | Homer Fleming | — | — |
| 28 | June 1946 | Michael Strogoff | Jules Verne | Pat Adams | Arnold Hicks | — | — |
| 29 | July 1946 | The Prince and the Pauper | Mark Twain | Scott Feldman and Jack Bass | Arnold Hicks | — | — |
| 30 | September 1946 | The Moonstone | Wilkie Collins | Dan Levin | Don Rico | — | — |
| 31 | October 1946 | The Black Arrow | Robert Louis Stevenson | Tom Scott and Ruth Roche | Arnold Hicks | — | — |
| 32 | December 1946 | Lorna Doone | R. D. Blackmore | Ruth Roche | Matt Baker | — | — |
| 33 | January 1947 | The Adventures of Sherlock Holmes (The Hound of the Baskervilles) | Arthur Conan Doyle | | Louis Zansky with Henry C. Kiefer | — | — |
| 34 | February 1947 | Mysterious Island | Jules Verne | Manning Stokes | David Heames; Bob Webb (as "Robert Hayward Webb") | — | — |
Issued as Classics Illustrated titles
| 35 | (March 1947) | The Last Days of Pompeii | Edward Bulwer-Lytton | I. Thos | Henry C. Kiefer (as "H. C. Kiefer") | Alfred Sundel | Jack Kirby and Dick Ayers |
| 36 | (April 1947) | Typee | Herman Melville | Harry G. Miller | Ezra Whiteman | — | — |
| 37 | (May 1947) | The Pioneers | James Fenimore Cooper | Sam Willinsky | Rudy Palais | — | — |
| 38 | (June 1947) | The Adventures of Cellini | John Addington Symonds | Leslie Katz | August Froehlich | Alfred Sundel | Dino Battaglia |
| 39 | (July 1947) | Jane Eyre | Charlotte Brontë | Harry G. Miller (as "Harry Glickman") | Harley Griffiths | Alfred Sundel | H. J. Kihl |
| 40 | (August 1947) | Mysteries ("The Pit and the Pendulum," "The Unparalleled Adventure of One Hans Pfaall," "The Fall of the House of Usher") | Edgar Allan Poe | Samuel Willinsky | August Froehlich; Henry C. Kiefer; Harley Griffiths | — | — |
| 41 | (September 1947) | Twenty Years After | Alexandre Dumas, père | Harry G. Miller | Robert C. Burns | — | — |
| 42 | | The Swiss Family Robinson | Jonathan Wyss | Elspeth Campbell | Henry C. Kiefer | | Norman Nodel |
| 43 | (November 1947) | Great Expectations | Charles Dickens | | Henry C. Kiefer | — | — |
| 44 | (December 1947) | Mysteries of Paris | Eugene Sue | Albert Avitabile | Henry C. Kiefer | — | — |
| 45 | (January 1948) | Tom Brown's School Days | Thomas Hughes | | Homer Fleming | Alfred Sundel | John Tartaglione |
| 46 | | Kidnapped | Robert Louis Stevenson | John O'Rourke | Bob Webb and David Heames | — | — |
| 47 | | Twenty Thousand Leagues Under the Seas | Jules Verne | | Henry C. Kiefer | — | — |
| 48 | | David Copperfield | Charles Dickens | George Lipscomb | Henry C. Kiefer | — | — |
| 49 | | Alice in Wonderland | Lewis Carroll | | Alex Blum | — | — |
| 50 | | Tom Sawyer | Mark Twain | Harry G. Miller | Aldo Rubano | — | — |
| 51 | | The Spy | James Fenimore Cooper | | Arnold Hicks | — | — |
| 52 | (October 1948) | The House of the Seven Gables | Nathaniel Hawthorne | John O'Rourke | Harley Griffiths | | George Woodbridge |
| 53 | (November 1948) | Christmas Carol | Charles Dickens | George Lipscomb | Henry C. Kiefer | — | — |
| 54 | (December 1948) | The Man in the Iron Mask | Alexandre Dumas, père | John O'Rourke | August Froehlich | | Ken Battefield |
| 55 | (January 1949) | Silas Marner | George Eliot | Harry G. Miller (as "Harry Glickman") | Arnold Hicks | — | — |
| 56 | (February 1949) | Toilers of the Sea | Victor Hugo | Harry G. Miller (as "Harry Glickman") | August Froehlich | Alfred Sundel | Angelo Torres |
| 57 | (March 1949) | The Song of Hiawatha | Henry Wadsworth Longfellow | | Alex Blum | — | — |
| 58 | (April 1949) | The Prairie | James Fenimore Cooper | | Rudy Palais (as "Rudolph Palais") | — | — |
| 59 | | Wuthering Heights | Emily Brontë | Harry G. Miller (as "Harry Glickman") | Henry C. Kiefer | — | — |
| 60 | (June 1949) | Black Beauty | Anna Sewell | | August Froehlich | Alfred Sundel | L. B. Cole, Norman Nodel, and Stephen Addeo |
| 61 | | The Woman in White | Wilkie Collins | John O'Rourke | Alex Blum | — | — |
| 62 | (August 1949) | Western Stories ("The Luck of Roaring Camp," "The Outcasts of Poker Flat") | Bret Harte | | Henry C. Kiefer | — | — |
| 63 | | The Man Without a Country | Edward Everett Hale | John O'Rourke | Henry C. Kiefer | Alfred Sundel | Angelo Torres and Stephen Addeo |
| 64 | | Treasure Island | Robert Louis Stevenson | Ken Fitch | Alex Blum | — | — |
| 65 | | Benjamin Franklin – Autobiography | Benjamin Franklin | Adelaide Lee | Alex Blum; Robert Hebberd; Gus Schrotter (as "Gustave Schrotter") | — | — |
| 66 | (December 1949) | The Cloister and the Hearth | Charles Reade | Leslie Katz | Henry C. Kiefer | — | — |
| 67 | | The Scottish Chiefs | Jane Porter | John O'Rourke | Alex Blum | — | — |
| 68 | | Julius Caesar | William Shakespeare | | Henry C. Kiefer | Alfred Sundel | Reed Crandall and George Evans |
| 69 | | Around the World in 80 Days | Jules Verne | | Henry C. Kiefer | — | — |
| 70 | | The Pilot | James Fenimore Cooper | | Alex Blum | — | — |
| 71 | (May 1950) | The Man Who Laughs | Victor Hugo | | Alex Blum | Alfred Sundel | Norman Nodel |
| 72 | | The Oregon Trail | Francis Parkman | John O'Rourke | Henry C. Kiefer | — | — |
| 73 | (July 1950) | The Black Tulip | Alexandre Dumas, père | Ken Fitch | Alex Blum | — | — |
| 74 | (August 1950) | Mr Midshipman Easy | Frederick Marryat | Ken Fitch | Bob Lamme | — | — |
| 75 | (September 1950) | The Lady of the Lake | Walter Scott | George Lipscomb | Henry C. Kiefer | — | — |
| 76 | | The Prisoner of Zenda | Anthony Hope | Ken Fitch | Henry C. Kiefer | — | — |
| 77 | | The Iliad | Homer | | Alex Blum | — | — |
| 78 | | Joan of Arc | --- | Sam Willinsky | Henry C. Kiefer | — | — |
| 79 | | Cyrano de Bergerac | Edmond Rostand | Ken Fitch | Alex Blum | — | — |
| 80 | (February 1951) | White Fang | Jack London | Ken Fitch | Alex Blum | — | — |
| 81 | | The Odyssey | Homer | | Harley Griffiths | — | — |
| 82 | | The Master of Ballantrae | Robert Louis Stevenson | Ken Fitch | Lawrence Dresser | — | — |
| 83 | (May 1951) | The Jungle Book | Rudyard Kipling | | Alex Blum; William Bossert | — | Norman Nodel |
| 84 | (June 1951) | The Gold Bug and Other Stories | Edgar Allan Poe | | Alex Blum | — | — |
| 85 | | The Sea Wolf | Jack London | John O'Rourke | Alex Blum | — | — |
| 86 | | Under Two Flags | Ouida | Ken Fitch (as "Kenneth W. Fitch") | Maurice Del Bourgo; John Bulthuis | — | — |
| 87 | | A Midsummer Night's Dream | William Shakespeare | Sam Willinsky | Alex Blum | — | — |
| 88 | | Men of Iron | Howard Pyle | John O'Rourke | Lawrence Dresser; Gus Schrotter (as "Gustav Schrotter"); Harry Daugherty | — | — |
| 89 | | Crime and Punishment | Dostoyevsky | | Rudy Palais (as "Rudolph Palais") | — | — |
| 90 | | Green Mansions | W H Hudson | George Lipscomb | Alex Blum | — | — |
| 91 | | The Call of the Wild | Jack London | Ken Fitch | Maurice Del Bourgo | — | — |
| 92 | | The Courtship of Miles Standish and Evangeline | Longfellow | | Alex Blum | — | — |
| 93 | | Pudd'nhead Wilson | Samuel L Clemens | | Henry C. Kiefer | — | — |
| 94 | | David Balfour | Robert Louis Stevenson | | Rudy Palais | — | — |
| 95 | May 1952 | All Quiet on the Western Front | Erich Maria Remarque | Ken Fitch | Maurice Del Bourgo | — | — |
| 96 | | Daniel Boone | John Bakeless | Ken Fitch | Alex Blum | — | — |
| 97 | | King Solomon's Mines | H. Rider Haggard | Ken Fitch (as "Kenneth W. Fitch") | Henry C. Kiefer (as "H. C. Kiefer") | — | — |
| 98 | | The Red Badge of Courage | Stephen Crane | | Gus Schrotter (as "Gustav Schrotter") | — | — |
| 99 | | Hamlet | William Shakespeare | Sam Willinsky | Alex Blum | — | — |
| 100 | | Mutiny on the Bounty | Charles Nordhoff & James Norman Hall | Ken Fitch | Morris Waldinger | — | — |
| 101 | | William Tell | Frederick Schiller | Ken Fitch | Maurice Del Bourgo | — | — |
| 102 | | The White Company | Arthur Conan Doyle | Ken Fitch | Alex Blum | — | — |
| 103 | | Men Against the Sea | Charles Nordhoff & James Norman Hall | Ken Fitch | Rudy Palais | — | — |
| 104 | | Bring 'Em Back Alive | Frank Buck and Edward Anthony | Ken Fitch | Henry C. Kiefer | — | — |
| 105 | | From the Earth to the Moon | Jules Verne | | Alex Blum | — | — |
| 106 | | Buffalo Bill | (Uncredited; possibly based on An Autobiography of Buffalo Bill by William Cody) | | Maurice Del Bourgo | — | — |
| 107 | | King — of the Khyber Rifles | Talbot Mundy | | Sy Moskowitz | — | — |
| 108 | | Knights of the Round Table | (Uncredited; based in part on The Story of King Arthur and his Knights by Howard Pyle) | | Alex Blum | — | — |
| 109 | | Pitcairn's Island | Charles Nordhoff & James Norman Hall | Ken Fitch | Rudy Palais | — | — |
| 110 | (August 1953) | A Study in Scarlet | Arthur Conan Doyle | Ken Fitch | Sy Moskowitz | — | — |
| 111 | | The Talisman | Walter Scott | Ken Fitch (as "Kenneth W. Fitch") | Sy Moskowitz (as "Seymour Moskowitz") | — | — |
| 112 | | The Adventures of Kit Carson | Edward Ellis | Ken Fitch (as "Kenneth W. Fitch") | Rudy Palais | — | — |
| 113 | | The Forty Five Guardsmen | Alexandre Dumas, père | Ken Fitch | Maurice Del Bourgo | — | — |
| 114 | | The Red Rover | James Fenimore Cooper | | Pete Costanza | — | — |
| 115 | | How I Found Livingstone | Henry M Stanley | | Sal Trapani and Sal Finocchiaro | — | — |
| 116 | | The Bottle Imp (also "The Beach of Falesá") | Robert Louis Stevenson | | Lou Cameron | — | — |
| 117 | | Captains Courageous | Rudyard Kipling | Ira Zweifach | Pete Costanza | — | — |
| 118 | | Rob Roy | Walter Scott | Harry G. Miller | Rudy Palais and Walter Palais | — | — |
| 119 | | Soldiers of Fortune | Richard Harding Davis | Harry G. Miller | Kurt Schaffenberger | — | — |
| 120 | | Hurricane | Charles Nordhoff & James Norman Hall | Harry G. Miller | Lou Cameron | — | — |
| 121 | | Wild Bill Hickok | Wild Bill Hickok | Ira Zweifach | Medio Iorio and Sal Trapani | — | — |
| 122 | | The Mutineers | Charles Boardman Hawes | Harry G. Miller | Pete Costanza | — | — |
| 123 | | Fang and Claw | Frank Buck | | Lin Streeter | — | — |
| 124 | | The War of the Worlds | H. G. Wells | Harry G. Miller | Lou Cameron | — | — |
| 125 | | The Ox-Bow Incident | Walter Van Tilburg Clark | Lorenz Graham | Norman Nodel | — | — |
| 126 | | The Downfall | Émile Zola | | Lou Cameron | — | — |
| 127 | | The King of the Mountains | Edmond About (translated by Mary Louise Booth) | | Norman Nodel | — | — |
| 128 | | Macbeth | William Shakespeare | Lorenz Graham | Alex Blum | — | — |
| 129 | (November 1955) | Davy Crockett | (Uncredited; based on A Narrative of the Life of David Crockett of the State of Tennessee by Davy Crockett) | | Lou Cameron | — | — |
| 130 | | Caesar's Conquests (see also Caesar's Civil War) | Julius Caesar | Annette T. Rubenstein | Joe Orlando | — | — |
| 131 | | The Covered Wagon | Emerson Hough | Annette T. Rubenstein | Norman Nodel | — | — |
| 132 | | The Dark Frigate | Charles Boardman Hawes | Annette T. Rubinstein | Ed Waldman; Bob Webb | — | — |
| 133 | | The Time Machine | H. G. Wells | Lorenz Graham | Lou Cameron | — | — |
| 134 | | Romeo and Juliet | William Shakespeare | | George Evans | — | — |
| 135 | | Waterloo | Chatrian Erckmann | | Graham Ingels | — | — |
| 136 | | Lord Jim | Joseph Conrad | | George Evans | — | — |
| 137 | | The Little Savage | Frederick Marryat | | George Evans | — | — |
| 138 | | Journey to the Center of the Earth | Jules Verne | | Norman Nodel | — | — |
| 139 | | Reign of Terror | G. A. Henty | | George Evans | — | — |
| 140 | | On Jungle Trails | Frank Buck | | Norman Nodel | — | — |
| 141 | | Castle Dangerous | Walter Scott | | Stan Campbell | — | — |
| 142 | | Abraham Lincoln (Abraham Lincoln: A Biography) | Benjamin P. Thomas | | Norman Nodel | — | — |
| 143 | | Kim | Rudyard Kipling | | Joe Orlando | — | — |
| 144 | | First Men in the Moon | H. G. Wells | | George Woodbridge; Al Williamson; Angelo Torres; Roy Krenkel | — | — |
| 145 | | The Crisis | Winston Churchill | | George Evans | — | — |
| 146 | | With Fire and Sword | Henryk Sienkiewicz | Betty Jacobson | George Woodbridge | — | — |
| 147 | | Ben Hur | Lew Wallace | Betty Jacobson | Joe Orlando | — | — |
| 148 | | Buccaneer | Based on the Cecil B. DeMille film, which was in turn based on the novel Lafitte the Pirate by Lyle Saxon | | Bob Jenney; George Evans | — | — |
| 149 | | Off on a Comet | Jules Verne | | Gerald McCann | — | — |
| 150 | | The Virginian | Owen Wister | | Norman Nodel | — | — |
| 151 | | Won by the Sword | G. A. Henty | | John Tartaglione | — | — |
| 152 | | Wild Animals I Have Known | Ernest Thompson Seton | | L. B. Cole | — | — |
| 153 | | The Invisible Man | H. G. Wells | Alfred Sundel | Norman Nodel | — | — |
| 154 | | The Conspiracy of Pontiac | Francis Parkman | Alfred Sundel | Gerald McCann | — | — |
| 155 | | The Lion of the North | G. A. Henty | Alfred Sundel | Norman Nodel | — | — |
| 156 | | The Conquest of Mexico | Bernal Diaz Del Castillo | Alfred Sundel | Bruno Premiani | — | — |
| 157 | | The Lives of the Hunted | Ernest Thompson Seton | Alfred Sundel | Norman Nodel | — | — |
| 158 | | The Conspirators | Alexandre Dumas, père | Alfred Sundel | Gerald McCann | — | — |
| 159 | | The Octopus | Frank Norris | Alfred Sundel | Gray Morrow | — | — |
| 160 | | The Food of the Gods | H. G. Wells | Alfred Sundel | Tony Tallarico | — | — |
| 161 | | Cleopatra | H. Rider Haggard | Alfred Sundel | Norman Nodel | — | — |
| 162 | | Robur the Conqueror | Jules Verne | Alfred Sundel | Don Perlin | — | — |
| 163 | | The Master of the World | Jules Verne | Alfred Sundel | Gray Morrow | — | — |
| 164 | | The Cossack Chief | Nikolai Gogol | Alfred Sundel | Sid Miller | — | — |
| 165 | | The Queen's Necklace | Alexandre Dumas, père | Alfred Sundel | Gray Morrow | — | — |
| 166 | | Tigers and Traitors | Jules Verne | Alfred Sundel | Norman Nodel | — | — |
| 167 | (August 1967) | Faust | Goethe | Alfred Sundel | Norman Nodel | — | — |
| 168 | Winter 1969 | In Freedom's Cause | G. A. Henty | Alfred Sundel | George Evans; Reed Crandall | — | — |
| 169 | Spring 1969 | Negro Americans, the Early Years | (biographical sketches of Crispus Attucks, Peter Salem, Prince Hall, Prince Whipple, Oliver Cromwell, Spy James, Deborah Gannett, Benjamin Banneker, Phillis Wheatley, James Beckwourth, Harriet Tubman, Frederick Douglass, Robert Smalls, William Carney, Martin Delany, Charles H. Davis, Henry Flipper, Isaiah Dorman, Nat Love, Daniel Hale Williams, Elijah McCoy, Garrett A. Morgan, Granville T. Woods, Booker T. Washington, George Washington Carver, and Matthew Henson) | Deena Weintraub | Norman Nodel; Martin Nodell; Gray Morrow | — | — |

=== Classics Illustrated Special Issue ===
Publication dates from Classics Central.

| Issue | Original publication (Note: Publication dates for Classics Illustrated Special Issue from Classics Central.) | Title | Chapters | Author | Illustrator(s) | Notes |
|---|---|---|---|---|---|---|
| 129A | December 1955 | The Story of Jesus | N/A | Lorenz Graham | William A. Walsh & Alex Blum | |
| 132A | June 1956 | The Story of America | The Man Who Discovered America, The Birth of America, Paul Revere's Ride, The Star Spangled Banner | | Lou Cameron | |
| 135A | (December 1956) | The Ten Commandments | The Ten Commandments, Joseph and His Brethren | Lorenz Graham | Norman Nodel | |
| 138A | June 1957 | Adventures in Science | The Story of Flight, Andy's Atomic Adventure, The Discoveries of Louis Pasteur, From Tom Tom to TV | | Pete Costanza | |
| 141A | December 1957 | The Rough Rider | The Rough Rider | | | Biography of Theodore Roosevelt; "prepared in cooperation with the Theodore Roosevelt Centennial Commission." |
| 144A | June 1958 | Blazing the Trails West | "Gold, Fur and Freedom"; "Daniel Boone"; "The Lewis and Clark Expedition"; "The Santa Fe Trail"; "Fur and Mountains"; "Kit Carson"; "Texas and the Alamo"; "The Mexican War" | | | |
| 147A | December 1958 | Crossing the Rockies | The Oregon Trail, Death and the Donners, This Is the Place, The Gold Rush, The Apache Wars, The Overland Mail, The Pony Express, Bound by Rails | | Don Perlin, Norman Nodel; George Evans; Reed Crandall; Joe Orlando | |
| 150A | June 1959 | Royal Canadian Mounted Police | "March to Fort Whoop-Up"; "Pony soldiers"; "Indians and outlaws"; "Unrest and rebellion"; "Patrolling the prairies"; "The gold rush"; "Into the far North"; "The modern Mountie"; "Manhunt!"; "Molding a Mountie" | | Sam Glanzman; Graham Ingels; Sid Check; Stan Campbell; Ray Ramsey; Norman Nodel | |
| 153A | December 1959 | Men, Guns and Cattle | Horns and Hoofs, Iron Fisted Marshall, Wild Bill Hickok, The Chisholm Trail, The Lincoln County War, Dodge City Lawman, The Last Warpath, The West's Wildest Town, The Death of Tombstone, Koohoppers and Cactus Cats, The Closing Frontier | | George Evans; Gerald McCann; Everett Kinstler; Norman Nodel; George Peltz | |
| 156A | June 1960 | The Atomic Age | Adventure North, The Smallest Particle, Inside the Atom, The Atomic Furnace, The Magic Mineral, Alpha, Beta, and Gamma, Atoms for Power, The Radioscope, Atoms and Industry, Atoms and Agriculture, Atoms and Medicine, The Healing Rays, The Atom Tomorrow | | Norman Nodel; Bruno Premiani; Sam Glanzman; Everett Kinstler; George Evans | |
| 159A | December 1960 | Rockets, Jets and Missiles | The Flight of the X-1, Space Talk, The Jet Is Born, Space Talk, Jet Engines, Jets Around the World, Space Talk, Rockets Through Time, Space Talk, The Wizard of Worcester, Space Talk, Rocket Engines, Don't Do It Yourself, Space Talk, Rockets and Missiles Around the World, Artificial Moons, Space Talk, Seven for Space, Space Talk, Off Into Orbit, Space Talk, Doorway Into Tomorrow | | George Evans; Sam Glanzman; H. J. Kihl; Gerald McCann; Jack Abel; Gray Morrow | |
| 162A | June 1961 | The War Between the States | April, 1861: Fort Sumter, The Causes, July, 1861: Bull Run, Battle Report, April, 1862: Shiloh, April, 1862: New Orleans, April–July, 1862: The Peninsula, July, 1862: Kentucky, Battle Report, June, 1863: Brandy Station, June–July, 1863: Gettysburg, April–July, 1863: Vicksburg, September–November, 1863: Chattanooga, Battle Report, May–September, 1864: Georgia, October, 1864: The Atlantic, November, 1864: New York City, April, 1865: Appomattox Court House, Final Report, Reconstruction | | Jack Kirby & Dick Ayers; Sam Glanzman; Till Gooden; George Peltz; George Evans & Reed Crandall; Edd Ashe; John Tartaglione; Pete Morisi | |
| 165A | December 1961 | To the Stars | Man in the Skies, Earth in Space, The Magic Eye, The Giant of Palomar, Our Neighbor—the Moon, The Copper Moon, The Inner Planets: The Gods' Messenger, The Inner Planets: The Goddess, The Inner Planets: The Green World, The Inner Planets: The Red Planet, The Giants, The Georgian Planet, Uranus, Neptune, Planet X, Pluto, Are There Other Planets?, Fiery Streaks and Tails, Figures in the Sky, Star Facts, Our Nearest Star, The Disappearing Sun, Light Years, The Universe, The Universe and Life | | Angelo Torres; George Evans; Reed Crandall; Jack Kirby & Dick Ayers; Sam Glanzman; Jo Albistur; Charles Berger; Norman Nodel | |
| 166A | 1962 | World War II | World War II, The Fuehrer, War on the High Seas, Il Duce, The Conquest of Western Europe, The Battle of Britain, Warships and Wolf Packs, The Resistance, The Eastern Front, The Big Three, War in the Pacific, The Doolittle Raid, The Coral Sea and Midway, Guadalcanal, Tarawa, War Leaders, Stalingrad, War Leaders, Lidice and Warsaw, The Death Camps, North Africa, War Leaders, The Italian Campaign, Blockbusters and Buzz Bombs, The Normandy Invasion, The Battle of the Bulge, Victory in Europe, War Leaders, Leyte Gulf, The Mainland War, War Leaders, Iwo Jima and Okinawa, Victory in the Pacific, Crimes Against Humanity | | Angelo Torres; George Evans; John Tartaglione; Norman Nodel | |
| 167A | July 1962 | Prehistoric World | In Search of the Past, Survival of the Fittest, The Wonderful Earth Movie, The First Fishes, Living on Land, The Dinosaurs, Reptiles of the Sea and Air, A Missing Link, Mammals, Bones and Stones, The Treasure of Flaming Cliffs, End of an Era, The Age of the Mammals, Prehistoric Man, The Bulls of Altamira, The Dawn Men, Neanderthal Man, Homo Sapiens, Cro-Magnon Man, The Reindeer Age, The Races of Man, The Early Farmers, The Long Journeys: Into America, Into Africa, The Mixing of Peoples, Across the Pacific, The Stone Builders, The Fuegian Experiment, Primitives Today | | Angelo Torres; Reed Crandall; George Evans; Norman Nodel; Jo Albistur; Gerald McCann; Norman Nodel | |

=== Thorpe & Porter new issues ===
| Issue | Original publication | Title | Author | Adaptation | Illustrator |
|---|---|---|---|---|---|
| 143 | (1962) | Sail with the Devil | Daniel Defoe | Alfred Sundel | Norman Light |
| 146 | (1962) | Adventures of Baron Munchausen | Rudolf Erich Raspe | | Denis Gifford |
| 147 | (1962) | Through the Looking-Glass | Lewis Carroll | Jennifer Robertson | Jennifer Robertson |
| 148 | (1962) | Nights of Terror | Wilkie Collins | Alfred Sundel | Mick Anglo |
| 148 | (1962) | "A Terribly Strange Bed" | Wilkie Collins | Alfred Sundel | Mick Anglo |
| 148 | (1962) | "The Signal-Man" | Charles Dickens | Alfred Sundel | Mick Anglo |
| 149 | (1962) | The Gorilla Hunters | R. M. Ballantyne | Alfred Sundel | |
| 150 | (1962) | The Canterville Ghost | Oscar Wilde | Alfred Sundel | Mick Anglo |
| 156 | (1962) | The Dog Crusoe | R. M. Ballantyne | Alfred Sundel | Norman Light |
| 157 | 1962 | The Queen of Spades | Alexander Pushkin | Alfred Sundel | |
| 158A | (December 1962) | Doctor No | Ian Fleming | Alfred Sundel | Norman Nodel |
| 159 | (1963) | Master and Man | Leo Tolstoy | Alfred Sundel | |
| 161 | (1963) | The Aeneid | Virgil | Alfred Sundel | Reed Crandall |
| 162 | (1963) | Saga of the North | Pierre Loti | Alfred Sundel | Tomás Porto |
| 163 | (June 1963) | The Argonauts | Apollonius of Rhodes | Alfred Sundel | |

=== Double Duo issues ===
| Issue | Pub. date | Title | Author | Adaptation | Illustrator | Original publication (date) |
|---|---|---|---|---|---|---|
| 1 | 1976 | "Voyages to the Far East" | Fernão Mendes Pinto | Alfred Sundel | Spanish studio | Illustrerade klassiker #175 (Illustrerade klassiker, 1964) |
| 1 | 1976 | "The Brigands" | Marie-Henri Beyle | Alfred Sundel | Spanish studio | Illustrerade klassiker #172 (Illustrerade klassiker, 1964) |
| 2 | 1976 | "The Attack on the Mill" | Émile Zola | | Spanish studio | Illustrerade klassiker #177 (Illustrerade Klassiker, 1964) |
| 2 | 1976 | Escape of the Inca | William H. Prescott | | Spanish studio | Illustrerade klassiker #180 (Williams Förlags AB, 1965) |
| 3 | 1976 | March of the Ten Thousand | Xenophon | Alfred Sundel | Spanish studio | Illustrerade klassiker #170 (Illustrerade Klassiker, 1964) |
| 3 | 1976 | Ship from Buenos Aires | Herman Melville | Alfred Sundel | Spanish studio | Illustrerade klassiker #171 (Illustrerade Klassiker, 1964) |
| 4 | 1976 | "The Open Boat" | Stephen Crane | Alfred Sundel | Spanish studio | Illustrerade klassiker #169 (Illustrerade klassiker, 1964) |
| 4 | 1976 | The Denver Express | Augustus Allen Hayes | Alfred Sundel | Spanish studio | Illustrerade klassiker #179 (Williams Förlags AB, 1965) |
| 5 | 1976 | Sailing Uncharted Waters | Antonio Pigafetta (journal); John Fiske (book) | | Spanish studio | Illustrerade klassiker #182 (Williams Förlags AB, 1965) |
| 5 | 1976 | The Burma Road | | | Spanish studio | Illustrerade klassiker #202 (Williams Förlags AB, 1969) |
| 6 | 1976 | "The Blue Hotel" | Stephen Crane | Alfred Sundel | Spanish studio | Illustrerade klassiker #173 (Illustrerade klassiker, 1964) |
| 6 | 1976 | A Terrible Vengeance | Nikolai Gogol | Alfred Sundel | Spanish studio | Illustrerade klassiker #167 (Illustrerade klassiker, 1964) |
| 7 | 1976 | Battle of Jerusalem | Flavius Josephus | | Spanish studio | Illustrerade klassiker #201 (Williams Förlags AB, 1969) |
| 7 | 1976 | The Castle of Otranto | Horace Walpole | | Spanish studio | Illustrerade klassiker #174 (Illustrerade Klassiker, 1964) |
| 8 | 1976 | The Conquest of Peru | William H. Prescott | Alfred Sundel | Spanish studio | Illustrerade klassiker #166 (Illustrerade Klassiker, 1964) |
| 8 | 1976 | The Wandering Horseman | Nikolai Leskov | | Spanish studio | Illustrerade klassiker #181 (Williams Förlags AB, 1965) |
| 9 | 1977 | The Death of Captain Cook | James Cook | Alfred Sundel | Spanish studio | Illustrerade klassiker #165 (Illustrerade klassiker, 1964) |
| 9 | 1977 | The Young Carthaginian | G. A. Henty | Alfred Sundel | Spanish studio | Illustrerade klassiker #204 (Williams Förlags AB, 1970) |
| 10 | 1977 | Quest for the Grail | Wolfram von Eschenbach | | Spanish studio | Illustrerade klassiker #203 (Williams Förlags AB, 1969) |
| 10 | 1977 | The Seven That Were Hanged | Leonid Andreyev | | Spanish studio | Illustrerade klassiker #205 (Williams Förlags AB, 1970) |
| 11 | 1977 | Wreck of Sao Jao | Bernardo Gomes de Brito | | Spanish studio | Illustrerade klassiker #188 (Williams Förlags AB, 1966) |
| 11 | 1977 | Warlord of Mexico | Diego Durán | | Spanish studio | Illustrerade klassiker #187 (Williams Förlags AB, 1966) |
| 12 | 1977 | Martin Eden | Jack London | | Spanish studio | Illustrerade klassiker #192 (Williams Förlags AB, 1967) |
| 12 | 1977 | "Apostle of the Indies" (based on The Discovery of America) | John Fiske | | Spanish studio | Illustrerade klassiker #191 (Williams Förlags AB, 1966) |

=== First Comics run ===
The authorship is based on the Grand Comics Database.

| Issue | Pub. date | Title | Author | Adaptation | Illustrator |
|---|---|---|---|---|---|
| 1 | Feb. 1990 | The Raven and Other Poems | Edgar Allan Poe | Gahan Wilson | Gahan Wilson |
| 2 | Feb. 1990 | Great Expectations | Charles Dickens | Rick Geary | Rick Geary |
| 3 | Feb. 1990 | Through the Looking-Glass | Lewis Carroll | Kyle Baker | Kyle Baker |
| 4 | Feb. 1990 | Moby-Dick | Herman Melville | Dan Chichester & Bill Sienkiewicz | Bill Sienkiewicz |
| 5 | Mar. 1990 | Hamlet | William Shakespeare | Steven Grant | Tom Mandrake |
| 6 | Mar. 1990 | The Scarlet Letter | Nathaniel Hawthorne | P. Craig Russell | Jill Thompson |
| 7 | Apr. 1990 | The Count of Monte Cristo | Alexandre Dumas (père) | Steven Grant | Dan Spiegle |
| 8 | Apr. 1990 | Dr. Jekyll & Mr. Hyde | Robert Louis Stevenson | John K. Snyder III | John K. Snyder III |
| 9 | May 1990 | The Adventures of Tom Sawyer | Mark Twain | Mike Ploog | Mike Ploog |
| 10 | June 1990 | The Call of the Wild | Jack London | Charles Dixon | Ricardo Villagran |
| 11 | July 1990 | Rip Van Winkle | Washington Irving | Jeffrey Busch | Jeffrey Busch |
| 12 | Aug. 1990 | The Island of Doctor Moreau | H. G. Wells | Steven Grant | Eric Vincent |
| 13 | Sept. 1990 | Wuthering Heights | Emily Brontë | Rick Geary | Rick Geary |
| 14 | Oct. 1990 | The Fall of the House of Usher | Edgar Allan Poe | P. Craig Russell | P. Craig Russell and Jay Geldhof |
| 15 | Nov. 1990 | The Gift of the Magi and Other Stories | O. Henry | Gary Gianni | Gary Gianni |
| 16 | Dec. 1990 | A Christmas Carol | Charles Dickens | Joe Staton | Joe Staton |
| 17 | Jan. 1991 | Treasure Island | Robert Louis Stevenson | Pat Boyette | Pat Boyette |
| 18 | Feb. 1991 | The Devil's Dictionary and Other Works | Ambrose Bierce | Gahan Wilson | Gahan Wilson |
| 19 | Feb. 1991 | The Secret Agent | Joseph Conrad | John K. Snyder III | John K. Snyder III |
| 20 | Mar. 1991 | The Invisible Man | H. G. Wells | Rick Geary | Rick Geary |
| 21 | Mar. 1991 | Cyrano de Bergerac | Edmond Rostand | Peter David | Kyle Baker |
| 22 | Apr. 1991 | The Jungle Books | Rudyard Kipling | Jeffrey Busch | Jeffrey Busch |
| 23 | Apr. 1991 | Robinson Crusoe | Daniel Defoe | Sam Wray | Pat Boyette |
| 24 | May 1991 | The Rime of the Ancient Mariner | Samuel Taylor Coleridge | Dean Motter | Dean Motter |
| 25 | May 1991 | Ivanhoe | Sir Walter Scott | Mark Wayne Harris | Ray Lago |
| 26 | June 1991 | Aesop's Fables | Aesop | Eric Vincent | Eric Vincent |
| 27 | June 1991 | The Jungle | Upton Sinclair | Peter Kuper | Peter Kuper |

=== Acclaim Books new issues ===
| Issue | Pub. date | Title | Author | Adaptation | Illustrator(s) |
|---|---|---|---|---|---|
| 59 | February 1998 | Henry IV, Part 1 | William Shakespeare | Gregory Feeley | Pat Broderick |
| 61 | February 1998 | Narrative of the Life of Frederick Douglass | Frederick Douglass | Len Wein & Christine Vallada | Jamal Igle, Ravil Lopez, and Mike DeCarlo |
| 62 | February 1998 | The Scarlet Pimpernel | Baroness Orczy | Madeleine Robins | Pat Broderick & Ralph Reese |

=== PapercutzClassics Illustrated Deluxe graphic novels ===
| Volume | Pub. date | Title | Author | Adaptation | Illustrator(s) |
|---|---|---|---|---|---|
| 1 | 2008 | The Wind in the Willows | Kenneth Grahame | Michael Plessix | Michael Plessix |
| 2 | 2008 | Tales from the Brothers Grimm | The Brothers Grimm | Mazan, Philip Petit, and Cecile Chicault | Mazan, Philip Petit, and Cecile Chicault |
| 3 | 2009 | Frankenstein | Mary Shelley | Marion Mousse | Marion Mousse |
| 4 | 2009 | The Adventures of Tom Sawyer | Mark Twain | Jean-David Morvan and Frederique Voulyze | Severine Le Fevebvre |
| 5 | 2010 | Treasure Island | Robert Louis Stevenson | David Chauvel | Fred Simon |
| 6 | 2011 | The Three Musketeers | Alexandre Dumas (père) | Jean-David Morvan and Michel Dufranne | Rubén |
| 7 | 2011 | Around the World in Eighty Days | Jules Verne | Loïc Dauvillier | Aude Soleilhac |
| 8 | 2012 | Oliver Twist | Charles Dickens | Loïc Dauvillier | Olivier Deloye |
| 9 | 2012 | Scrooge: A Christmas Carol and "Mugby Junction" | Charles Dickens | Rodolphe | Estelle Meyrand |
| 10 | 2013 | "The Murders in the Rue Morgue" and Other Tales | Edgar Allan Poe | Jean-David Morvan and Corbeyran | Fabrice Druet and Paul Marcel |
| 11 | 2014 | The Sea-Wolf | Jack London | Riff Reb's | Riff Reb's |
| 12 | 2014 | The Monkey God | Wu Cheng'en | Jean-David Morvan and Yann Le Gal | Jian Yi |

=== Classic Comic Store [UK], 2008 onwards run ===
The authorship is based on the information held by Michigan State University Libraries, Special Collections Division in their Reading Room Index to the Comic Art Collection and/or the copyright information inside the books.

The titles and publication dates are obtained from a personal collection. (Note: For published issues, the titles and publication dates are obtained from the personal collection of Wikipedia editor "Phantomsteve". Future issue details are from the "in the coming months" list on the back of the most recently published issue (and/or from subscriber letters detailing future issues).)

| Issue | Publication Date | Title | Author | US Issue |
|---|---|---|---|---|
| 1 | October 2008 | The War of the Worlds | H. G. Wells | 124 |
| 2 | November 2008 | Oliver Twist | Charles Dickens | 23 |
| 3 | December 2008 | Robin Hood | (Uncredited) | 7 |
| 4 | January 2009 | The Man in the Iron Mask | Alexandre Dumas | 54 |
| 5 | February 2009 | Romeo and Juliet | William Shakespeare | 134 |
| 6 | March 2009 | Journey to the Center of the Earth | Jules Verne | 138 |
| 7 | April 2009 | Les Misérables | Victor Hugo | 9 |
| 8 | May 2009 | The Jungle Book | Rudyard Kipling (Note: Because of a printing error, first run prints of this issue of Classics Illustrated wrongly attributed the story to Jules Verne instead of Rudyard Kipling in the copyright details in the inside cover.) | 83 |
| 9 | June 2009 | Mutiny on the Bounty | Charles Nordhoff & James Norman Hall | 100 |
| 10 | July 2009 | Wuthering Heights | Emily Brontë | 59 |
| 11 | August 2009 | Knights of the Round Table | (Uncredited) | 108 |
| 12 | September 2009 | Jane Eyre | Charlotte Brontë | 39 |
| 13 | October 2009 | Frankenstein | Mary W. Shelley | 26 |
| 14 | November 2009 | The Time Machine | H. G. Wells | 133 |
| 15 | December 2009 | Christmas Carol | Charles Dickens | 53 |
| 16 | January 2010 | Moby Dick | Herman Melville | 5 |
| 17 | February 2010 | Macbeth | William Shakespeare | 128 |
| 18 | March 2010 | The Invisible Man | H. G. Wells | 153 |
| 19 | April 2010 | Huckleberry Finn | Mark Twain | 19 |
| 20 | May 2010 | Great Expectations | Charles Dickens | 43 |
| 21 | June 2010 | Treasure Island | Robert Louis Stevenson | 64 |
| 22 | July 2010 | Alice in Wonderland | Lewis Carroll | 49 |
| 23 | August 2010 | Black Beauty | Anna Sewell | 60 |
| 24 | September 2010 | Kidnapped | Robert Louis Stevenson | 46 |
| 25 | October 2010 | The Three Musketeers | Alexandre Dumas | 1 |
| 26 | November 2010 | Twenty Thousand Leagues Under The Sea | Jules Verne | 47 |
| 27 | December 2010 | Ben Hur | Lew Wallace | 147 |
| 28 | January 2011 | The Last Days of Pompeii | Edward Bulwer-Lytton | 35 |
| 29 | February 2011 | Ivanhoe | Sir Walter Scott | 2 |
| 30 | March 2011 | Julius Caesar | William Shakespeare | 68 |
| 31 | May 2011 | Around the World in 80 Days | Jules Verne | 69 |
| 32 | June 2011 | Nicholas Nickleby | Charles Dickens | New title |
| 33 | August 2011 | Dr Jekyll and Mr Hyde | Robert Louis Stevenson | 13 |
| 34 | October 2011 | The Last of the Mohicans | James Fenimore Cooper | 4 |
| 35 | November 2011 | Tale of Two Cities | Charles Dickens | 6 |
| 36 | December 2011 | The Hunchback of Notre Dame | Victor Hugo | 18 |
| 37 | January 2012 | A Study in Scarlet (also contains The Speckled Band) | Arthur Conan Doyle | 110 |
| 38 | February 2012 | The Count of Monte Cristo | Alexandre Dumas | 3 |
| 39 | April 2012 | Hamlet | William Shakespeare | 99 |
| 40 | May 2012 | David Copperfield | Charles Dickens | 58 |
| 41 | June 2012 | First Men in the Moon | H. G. Wells | 144 |
| 42 | July 2012 | The Ox-Bow Incident | Walter Van Tilburg Clark | 125 |
| 43 | September 2012 | Robinson Crusoe | Daniel Defoe | 10 |
| 44 | October 2012 | The 39 Steps | John Buchan | New title (Note: From the subscriber's letter: "Collectors among you may notice that number 44, John Buchan's The 39 Steps, is our second brand new title to the Classics Illustratedcanon, after introducing Charles Dickens' Nicholas Nickleby as number 32.") |
| 45 | September 2013 | Cleopatra | H. Rider Haggard | 161 |
| 46 | September 2013 | The Gold Bug and Other Stories (consists of "The Gold-Bug," "The Tell-Tale Heart," and "The Cask of Amontillado") | Edgar Allan Poe | 84 |
| 47 | September 2013 | Off on a Comet | Jules Verne | 149 |
| 48 | September 2013 | The Argonauts | Apollonius of Rhodes | Not issued in the US (Note: This is a title (one of 13) which were never issued in the US collection, but only in the UK.("Classics Illustrated History". Classic Comic Store. "In the UK, thirteen titles were produced that were never published in America including The Aeneid, The Argonauts...") This is the first such title to be published in the new UK collection.) |
| 49 | August 2016 | A Midsummer Night's Dream | William Shakespeare | 87 |
| 50 | May 2018 (Note: In an email sent out on 16 January 2018, Classic Comic Store announced "There are now 4 great new Classics Illustrated Replica titles available to pre-order, as we continue to fill in the gap in our numbering – numbers 50–53 now available for pre-order. Shipping begins in May.") | The Downfall | Émile Zola | 126 |
| 51 | May 2018 | The Iliad | Homer | 77 |
| 52 | May 2018 | The Hound of the Baskervilles | Arthur Conan Doyle | 33 |
| 53 | May 2018 | The Odyssey | Homer | 81 |
| 54 | March 2019 (Note: Issues 54–55, 72–73 had a release date of May 2019 on the Classic Comic Store website, with "First Published: April 2019" on the copyright notices inside the books, but they were in fact first sent out to purchasers in March 2019.) | Tom Sawyer | Mark Twain | 50 |
| 55 | March 2019 | The Prisoner of Zenda | Anthony Hope | 76 |
| 56 | October 2017 (Note: From an email in March 2017 from Classic Comic Store: "The 5 titles this October will be All Quiet on the Western Front, Joan of Arc, The Man Who Laughs, Daniel Boone and The Song of Hiawatha. This will take us to number 71 (with All Quiet as 56).") | All Quiet on the Western Front | Erich Maria Remarque | 95 |
| 57 | August 2016 | Tom Brown's School Days | Thomas Hughes | 45 |
| 58 | August 2016 | The Food of the Gods | H.G. Wells | 160 |
| 59 | August 2016 | Abraham Lincoln | (Uncredited) | 142 |
| 60 | August 2016 | Benjamin Franklin | Benjamin Franklin | 65 |
| 61 | August 2016 | Davy Crockett | David Crockett | 129 |
| 62 | August 2016 | Rob Roy | Sir Walter Scott | 118 |
| 63 | March 2017 | Buffalo Bill | William F. Cody | 106 |
| 64 | March 2017 | The Adventures of Kit Carson | (Uncredited) | 112 |
| 65 | March 2017 | The Oregon Trail | Francis Parkman | 72 |
| 66 | March 2017 | The Pioneers | James Fenimore Cooper | 37 |
| 67 | March 2017 | Wild Bill Hickok | Ira Zweifach (adapted by) | 121 |
| 68 | October 2017 | Daniel Boone | John Bakeless | 96 |
| 69 | October 2017 | Joan of Arc | Samuel Willinsky (adapted by) | 78 |
| 70 | October 2017 | The Song of Hiawatha | Henry Wadsworth Longfellow | 57 |
| 71 | October 2017 | The Man Who Laughs | Victor Hugo | 71 |
| 72 | March 2019 | The Aeneid | Virgil (adapted from John Dryden's English translation) | 170 (Note: This was published in November 2007 in North America by Jack Lake Productions, having previously only being published in the UK.) |
| 73 | March 2019 | Through the Looking Glass | Lewis Carroll | First Comics #3 |
| 74 | June 2022 | Don Quixote | Miguel de Cervantes | 11 |
| 75 | June 2022 | 3 Famous Mysteries (The Sign of the Four, The Flayed Hand, The Murders in the Rue Morgue) | Arthur Conan Doyle/Guy de Maupassant/Edgar Allan Poe | 21 |
| 76 | June 2022 | Arabian Nights | (Uncredited) | 8 |
| 77 | June 2022 | A Connecticut Yankee in King Arthur's Court | Mark Twain | 24 |
| 78 | July 2023 (Note: Although the website shows the publication date as 31 July 2023, it was not actually available until October) | The Black Arrow | Robert Louis Stevenson | 31 |
| 79 | July 2023 | Crime and Punishment | Fyodor Dostoyevsky | 89 |
| 80 | July 2023 | The Red Badge of Courage | Stephen Crane | 98 |
| 81 | July 2023 | The Deerslayer | James Fenimore Cooper | 17 |

Classic Comic Store UK run – Notes

== In other media ==
The Classics Illustrated branding was on a series of television films produced from 1977 to 1982 by Schick Sunn Classics; one of the executives at Shick Sunn Classics was Patrick Frawley, who at that point owned the Classics Illustrated brand:

- Last of the Mohicans (1977)
- Donner Pass: The Road to Survival (1978)
- The Time Machine (1978)
- The Deerslayer (1978)
- The Legend of Sleepy Hollow (1980)
- California Gold Rush (1981)
- The Adventures of Nellie Bly (1981)
- The Adventures of Huckleberry Finn (1981)
- The Fall of the House of Usher (1982)

== References in popular culture ==
- In the 1989 film Major League, Jake Taylor (Tom Berenger) reads the Classics Illustrated edition of Moby Dick in an effort to impress his former girlfriend, Lynn (Rene Russo) in the hopes that he might win her back (which he eventually does). Later on in the film, other teammates like Rick Vaughn (Charlie Sheen), Willie Mays Hayes (Wesley Snipes), and Roger Dorn (Corbin Bernsen) start reading other Classics Illustrated titles, such as The Song of Hiawatha, The Deerslayer, and Crime and Punishment.
- A copy of the Classics Illustrated version of David Copperfield figures in the 1985 film Heaven Help Us. At one point, the character Caesar (Malcolm Danare) is baffled by why a book report written by his friend Rooney (Kevin Dillon) contains continued references to W.C. Fields instead of Wilkins Micawber. Rooney responds by displaying the cover of the comic book, which depicts Fields as Mr. Micawber, based on his role in the 1935 film.
- Classics Illustrated #108, Knights of the Round Table (June 1953, Gilberton) is mentioned in the Warner Bros./CW show Supernatural season 8, episode 21: "The Great Escapist" (written by Ben Edlund, original air date 1 May 2013). Sam Winchester, ill and delirious, recalls to his brother Dean the memory of Dean reading the story to him when they were both small children. Sam laments that as he thought of the knights' purity, it made him realize that, even though he was a child, he was impure – and that he always knew deep down he was impure.
- In Arundhati Roy's book The God of Small Things (1997), "Rahel wasn't sure what she suffered from, but occasionally she practised sad faces, and sighing in the mirror.//'It is a far, far better thing that I do, than I have ever done', she would say to herself sadly. That was Rahel being Sydney Carton being Charles Darnay, as he stood on the steps, waiting to be guillotined, in the Classics Illustrated comic's version of A Tale of Two Cities".

== Cover gallery ==
Some Classic Comics issues (and one Classics Illustrated)

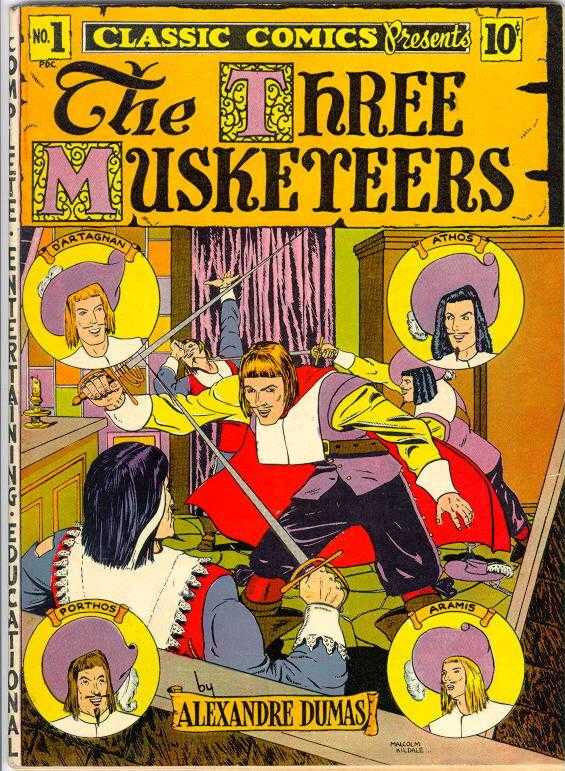
Three Musketeers
Issue #1

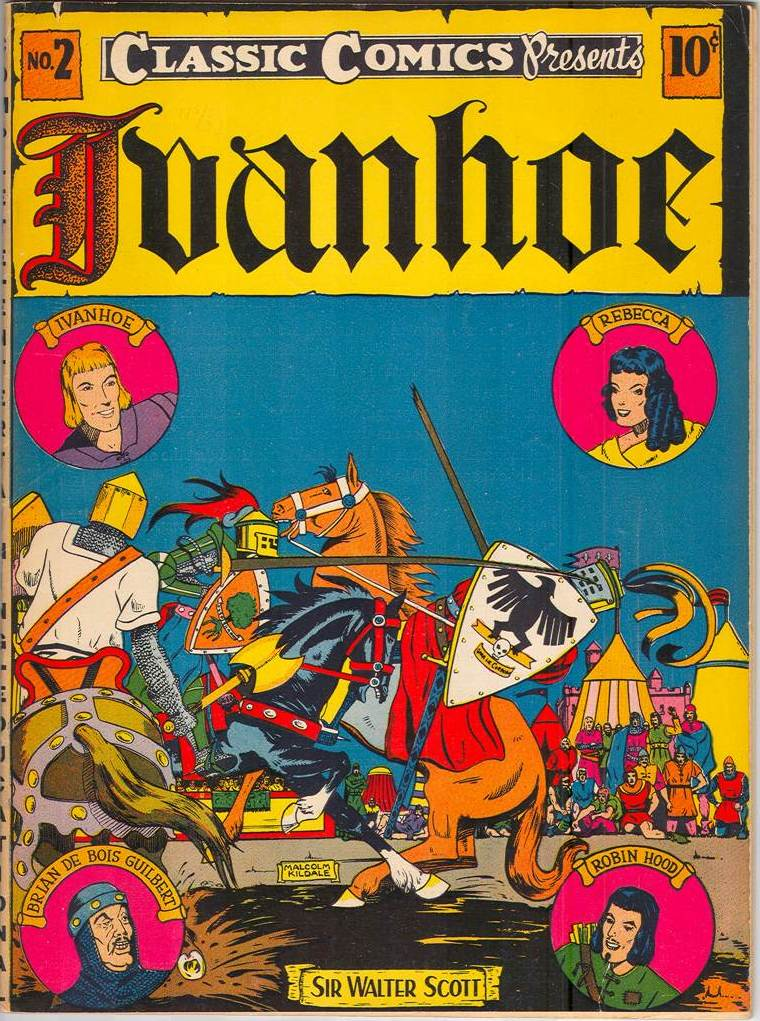
Ivanhoe
Issue #2

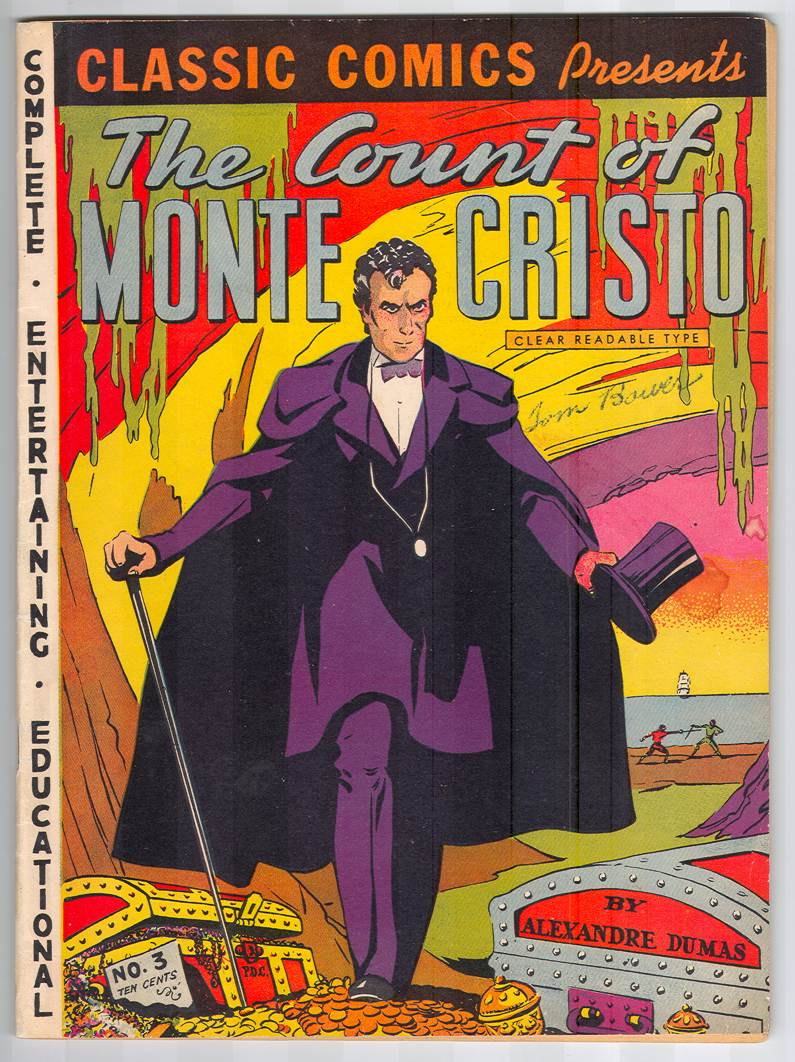
The Count of Monte Cristo
Issue #3

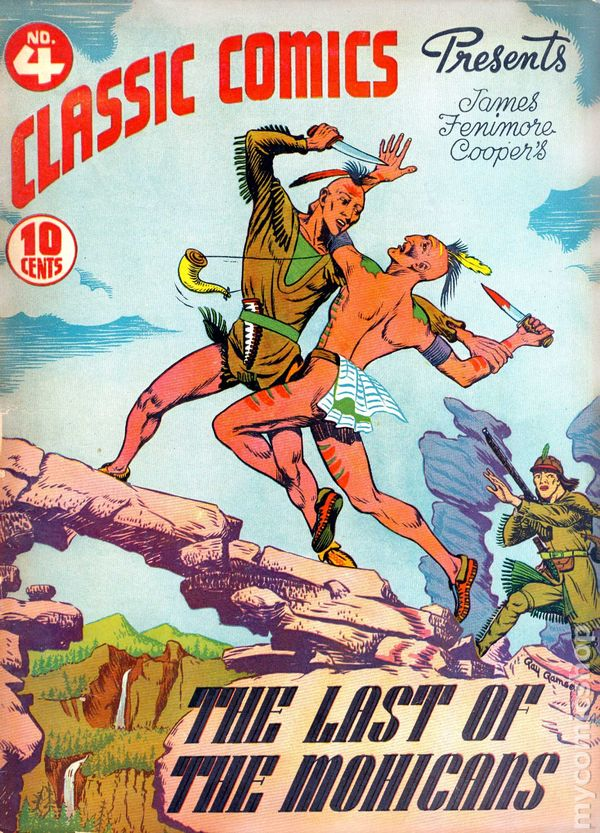
The Last of the Mohicans
Issue #4

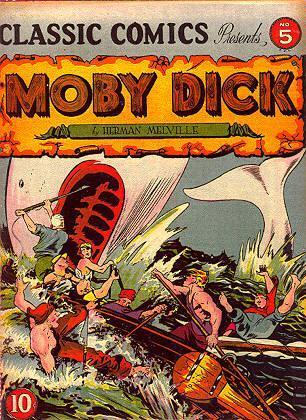
Moby Dick
Issue #5

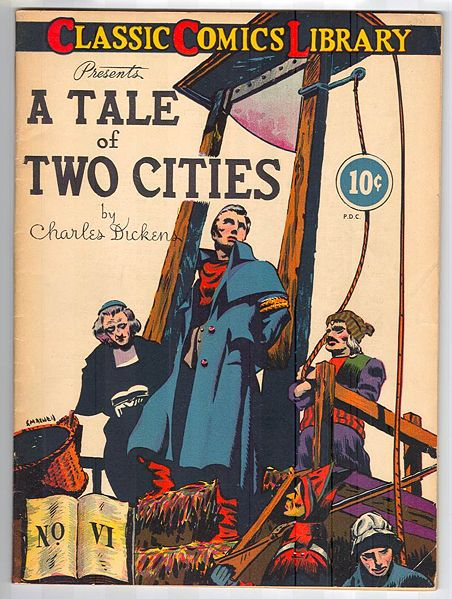
A Tale of Two Cities
Issue #6

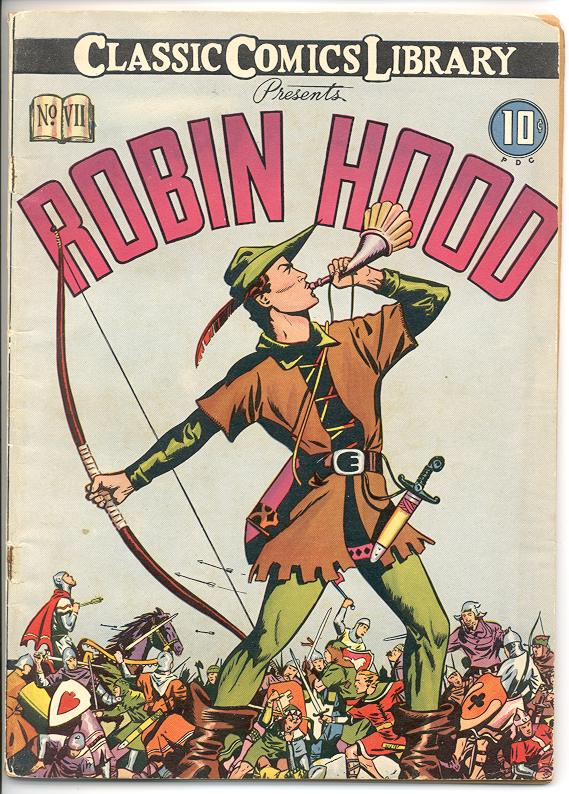
Robin Hood
Issue #7

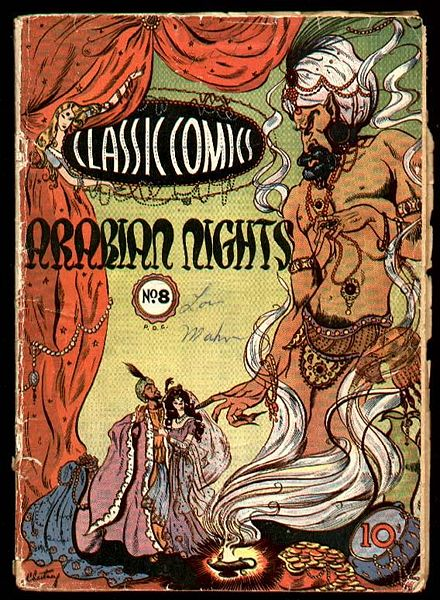
Arabian Nights
Issue #8

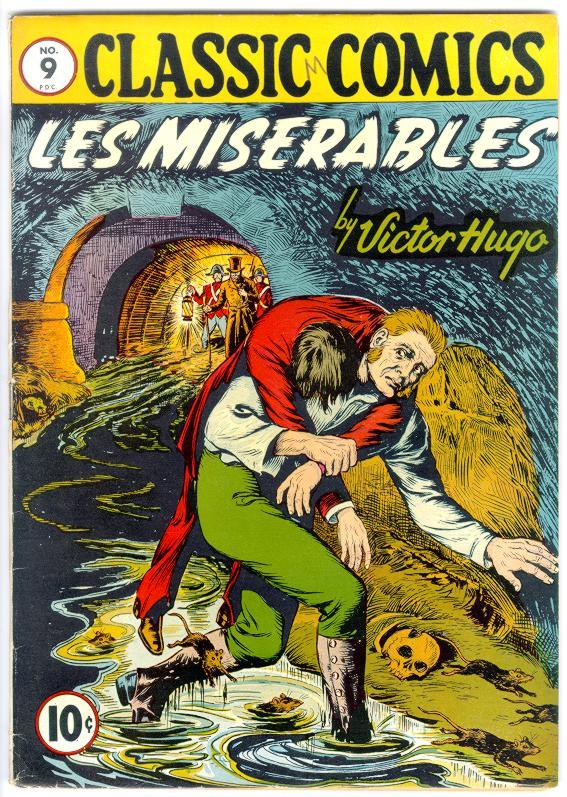
Les Misérables
Issue #9

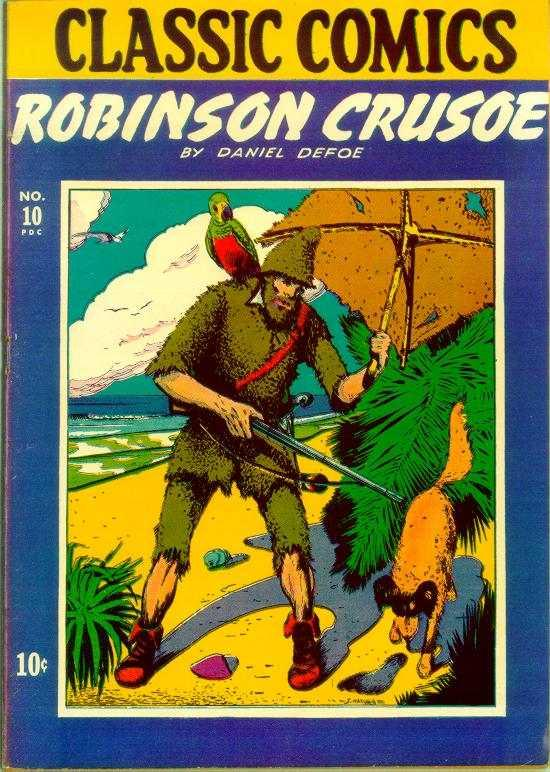
Robinson Crusoe
Issue #10

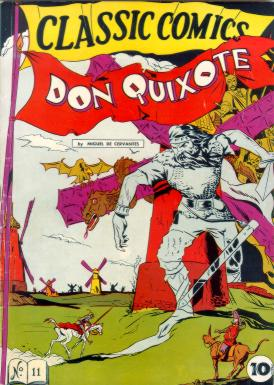
Don Quixote
Issue #11

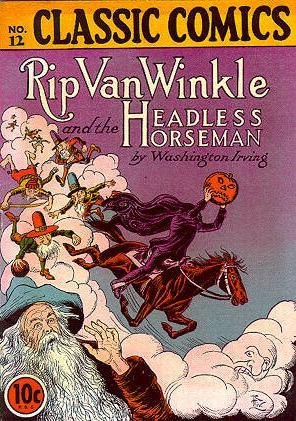
Rip Van Winkle
Issue #12

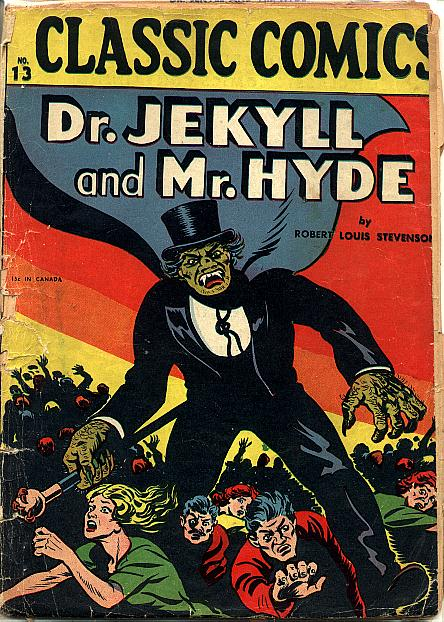
Dr. Jekyll and Mr. Hyde
Issue #13

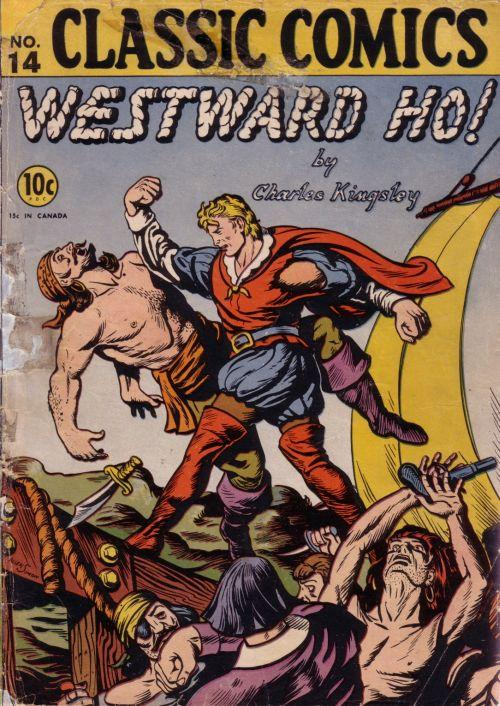
Westward Ho!
Issue #14

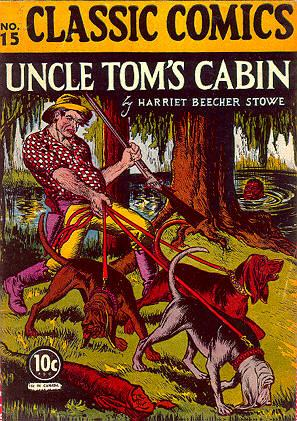
Uncle Tom's Cabin
Issue #15

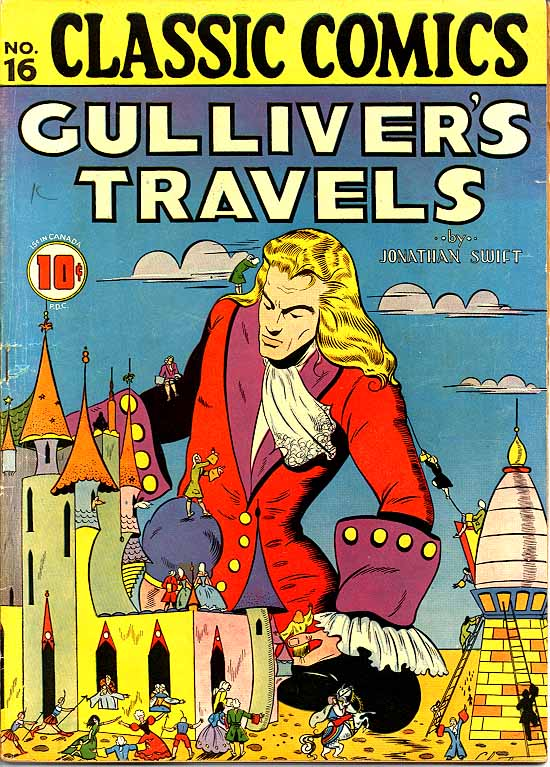
Gulliver's Travels
Issue #16

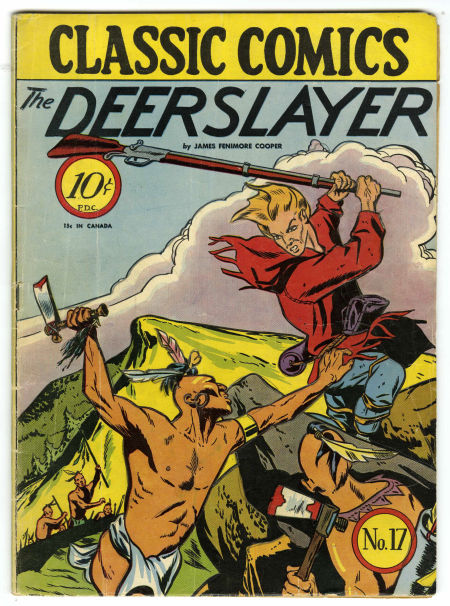
The Deerslayer
Issue #17

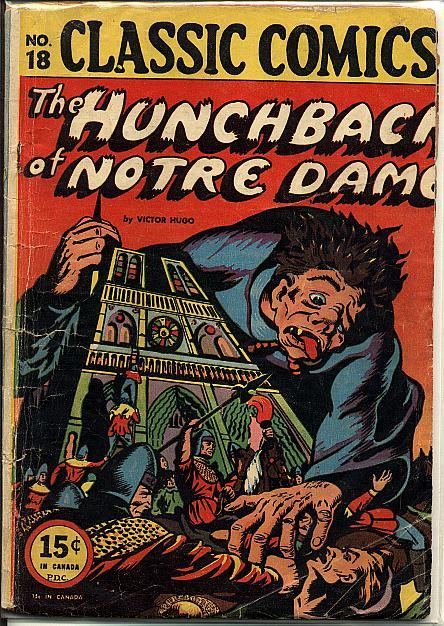
The Hunchback of Notre-Dame
Issue #18

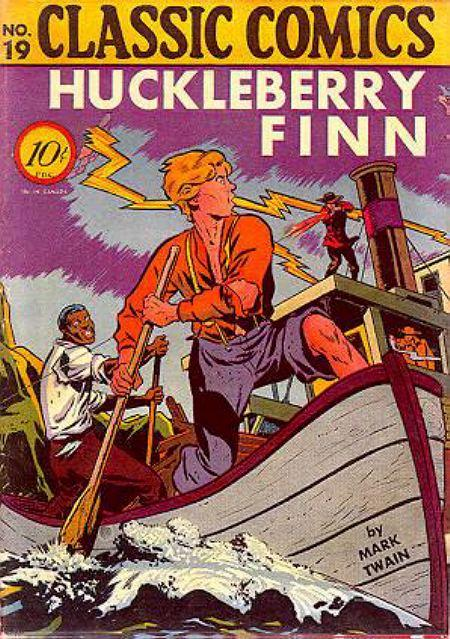
Huckleberry Finn
Issue #19

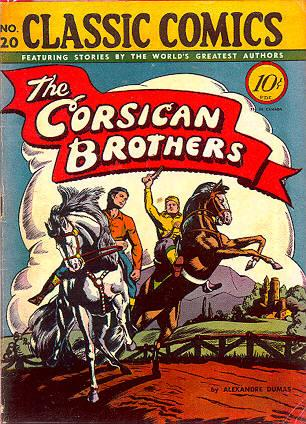
The Corsican Brothers
Issue #20

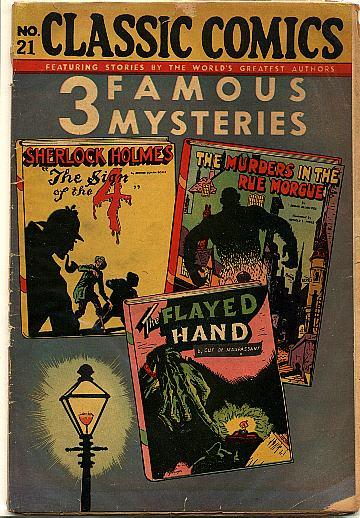
Three Famous Mysteries
Issue #21

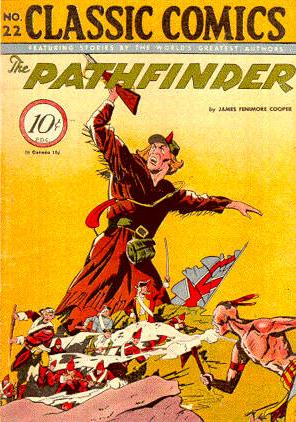
Pathfinder
Issue #22

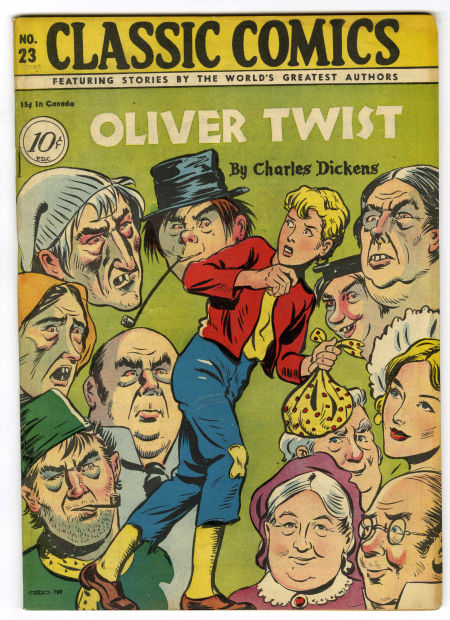
Oliver Twist
Issue #23

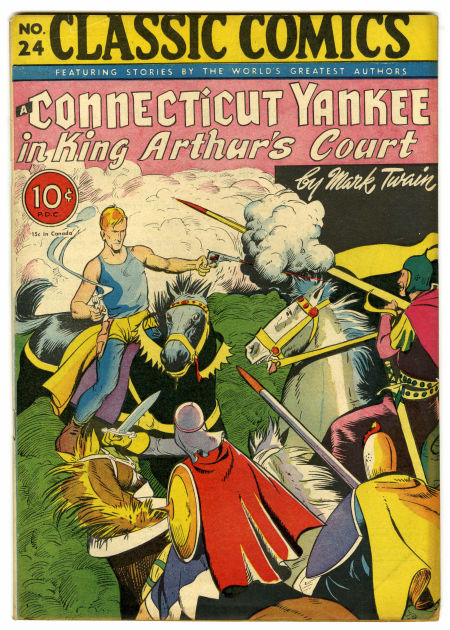
A Connecticut Yankee in King Arthur's Court
Issue #24

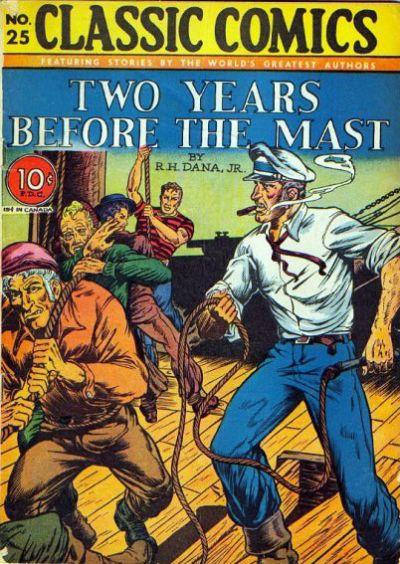
Two Years Before the Mast
Issue #25

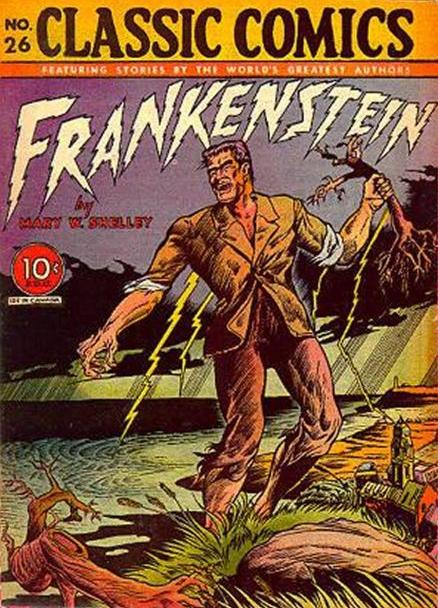
Frankenstein; or, The Modern Prometheus
Issue #26

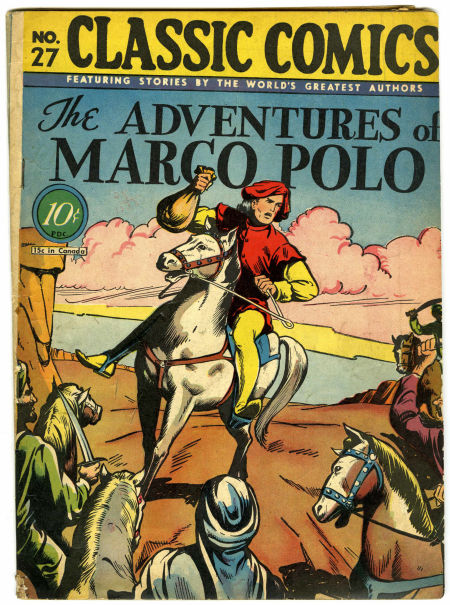
The Adventures of Marco Polo
Issue #27

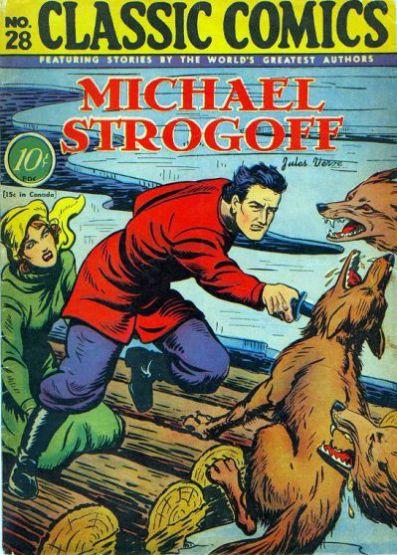
Michael Strogoff
Issue #28

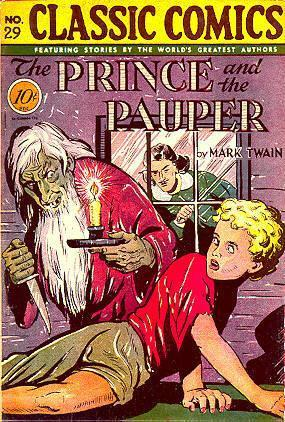
The Prince and the Pauper
Issue #29

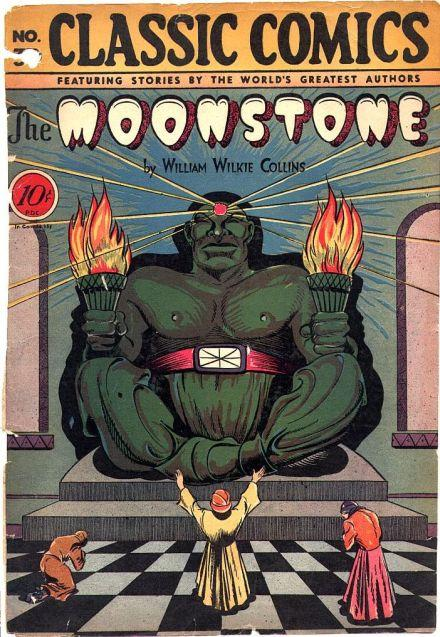
The Moonstone
Issue #30

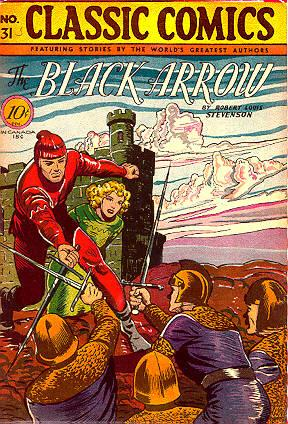
The Black Arrow
Issue #31

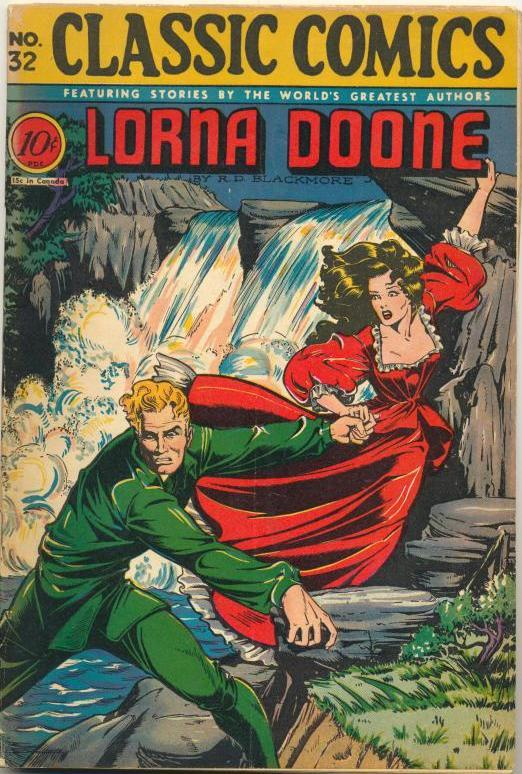
Lorna Doone
Issue #32

The Call of the Wild
Issue #91

== See also ==
Other companies or series producing comic adaptations of literature:

- Amar Chitra Katha – Indian publisher producing comic book adaptations of Indian legends and epics
- Classical Comics – British publisher producing graphic novel adaptations of the great works of literature, including Shakespeare, Charlotte Brontë, and Charles Dickens
- Graphic Classics – American anthology series produced from 2002 to 2016.
- Joyas Literarias Juveniles – from the Spanish publisher Editorial Bruguera, produced 270 adaptations of classic stories from 1970 to 1983. 28 of these have been translated into English and published as King Classics.
- Manga de Dokuha - Japanese series of manga versions of classic literature. Produced 139 adaptations of literary classics from 2007 to 2017.
- Marvel Classics Comics – Marvel Comics successor to Classics Illustrated that operated 1976–1978, reprinting some Pendulum Press titles and do a number of their own original adaptations
- Marvel Illustrated – Marvel Comics imprint founded in 2007 specializing in comic book adaptations of literary classics
- PAICO Classics – Indian series from the mid-1980s reprinting Pendulum Press's titles from the 1970s
- Pendulum Press – picked up comic book adaptations of classic literature in 1973
- Self Made Hero – British company producing adaptations of literature, including some of the same Shakespeare plays as Classical Comics
- Les Grands Classiques de la littérature en bande dessinée – French series of classics adaptations, published in 2017–2018 and incorporating titles from two previous series

== General and cited references ==
- Goulart, Ron. Great American Comic Books. Publications International, Ltd., 2001.
- Jones, William B. Jr., Classics Illustrated: A Cultural History, with Illustrations (Jefferson, N.C.: McFarland & Company, Inc., 2002). Second edition, 2011. ISBN 978-0-7864-8840-7
- Malan, Dan. The Complete Guide to Classics Illustrated. Classics Central.Com, 2006.
- Matthews, Kristin L. (2019). "Making reading popular : Cold War literacy and Classics Illustrated". Book History. 22: 320–341. doi:10.1353/bh.2019.0011. S2CID 208619505.
- Overstreet, Robert M.. Official Overstreet Comic Book Price Guide. House of Collectibles, 2004.
- Richardson, Donna "Classics Illustrated." American Heritage, Vol. 44.3, May/June 1993.
- Classic Comics at the Grand Comics Database
- Classics Illustrated at the Grand Comics Database
- Classics Illustrated (1941) at the Comic Book DB (archived from the original)
- Classics Illustrated Junior (1953) at the Comic Book DB (archived from the original)
- Classics Illustrated (1990) at the Comic Book DB (archived from the original)
