= Xingxing Fox =

Chinese cartoon series

Xingxing Fox (Chinese: 星星狐; pinyin: Xīngxing Hú; lit. 'Star Fox', stylized as XingXing Fox) is a cartoon that airs on China Central Television (CCTV). The main character is a pink fox and the main setting is a magical forest. It is produced by the Xiamen Bluebird Cartoon Company (simplified Chinese: 厦门青鸟动画有限公司; traditional Chinese: 廈門青鳥動畫有限公司; pinyin: Xiàmén Qīngniǎo Dònghuà Yǒuxiàngōngsī), headquartered in the Xiamen Software Park 2 (厦门软件园二期; 廈門軟件園二期; Xiàmén Ruǎnjiànyuán Èrqī) in Siming District, Xiamen.

On February 27, 2012 "The Vocation Experiences of Xing Xing Fox" won the Chinese TV Star Award, an award sponsored by the State Administration of Radio, Film and Television (SARFT).

At the 2013 Bologna Children's Book Fair Xiamen Bluebird announced it was giving Trajectory Inc. the worldwide distribution rights to Xingxing Fox. Trajectory is scheduled to make 50 Xingxing Fox e-books.

== Characters ==
The characters of Xingxing Fox: From left to right, top to bottom: Kazhi Rabbit, Dulu Bear, Mofa Mama (Witch), Tango Wolf, Xingxing Fox, and Duoduo Pig

- Xingxing Fox (星星狐; Xīngxing Hú; 'Star Fox') - A pink fox
- Dulu Bear (嘟噜熊; 嘟嚕熊; Dūlu Xióng) - A yellow bear
- Duoduo Pig (朵朵猪; 朵朵豬; Duǒduo Zhū) - A pink pig
- Kazhi Rabbit (咔吱兔; Kǎzhī Tù) - A white rabbit
- Mofa Mama (魔法妈妈; 魔法媽媽; Mófǎ Māma; 'Magic Mom') - A witch
- Tango Wolf (探戈狼; Tàngē Láng; 'Tango Wolf') - A dancing purple wolf

== See also ==
- Pleasant Goat and Big Big Wolf, another children's television series in China
- Boonie Bears, an animated 3D cartoon
- Shima Shima Tora no Shimajirō, a Japanese children's television series that airs in China as Qiao Hu
