= Dr. No (comics) =

Doctor No, as published by DC Comics. Cover art by Bob Brown.

Dr. No (or Doctor No) is a comic book by Norman Nodel. It is a loose adaptation of the eponymous James Bond film released in 1962, which in turn is inspired by the novel by Ian Fleming. It was first published in the United Kingdom in Classics Illustrated #158A.

== Description ==
The 32-page comic follows the film script and most of the characters are drawn to resemble their screen counterparts. Some deviations are found, such as Dr. No being electrocuted instead of drowned. The original British cover depicted Dr. No, as well as the scene in which Bond and Honey Ryder meet the tank disguised as a dragon.

For the US publishing, the comic was censored, deleting all racial skin colour and dialogue thought to be demeaning. It also received a different cover, by Bob Brown, an inside front cover with photos from the film, and an inside back cover with brief biographies of Bond and Fleming.

== Publication history ==
It was first published in the United Kingdom in Classics Illustrated #158A in December 1962, being later reprinted in Detective Stories by Dell Publishing through Europe.

The United States publisher of Classics Illustrated, Gilberton, marketed their CI series as educational in nature and felt that releasing Dr. No would be a poor marketing fit. So the rights were sold to Independent News, then-owners of DC Comics, who published the comic as issue 43 of the Showcase anthology series, in January 1963. As the US issue hit the news stands four months before the film's US release, sales were disappointing. With interior art very different from most other work published by DC Comics, it may have had trouble finding an audience since James Bond was still relatively unknown in the US at the time. DC has not published another James Bond comic since, though they considered starting a title when their 10-year option for a Bond comic was about to expire in 1972. Artist Jack Kirby and writer Alex Toth were contacted, but DC ultimately decided against it, feeling unsure about the future of the characters as Sean Connery made what he stated would be his last appearance as 007, Diamonds Are Forever.
