= Great Illustrated Classics =

Book series by Waldman Publishing Corporation

The Great Illustrated Classics book series offers easy-to-read adaptations of well known literary classics, featuring large print and illustrations on every other page. The series is targeted at children. There are currently 66 titles.

The series is owned, published, and sold by Waldman Publishing Corporation under the Baronet Books imprint. As of 2022, each release is available for purchase directly from the publisher's website, including bundled volumes of certain titles.

== Great Illustrated Classics ==
=== Classic Stories ===
Title	Code on spine	Publication date	Adapter	Original publication date	Original author	Notes
20,000 Leagues Under the Sea	C224-18	1977	Malvina G. Vogel	1870	Jules Verne	
Around the World in 80 Days	224-1	1977	Marian Leighton	1872	Jules Verne	
Black Beauty	224-2	1977	Deidre S. Laiken	1877	Anna Sewell	
Heidi	B224-12	1977	Deidre S. Laiken	1881	Johanna Spyri	
Kidnapped	C224-20	1977	Deborah Kestel	1886	Robert Luis Stevenson	
Little Women	224-4	1977	Lucia Monfried	1868	Louisa May Alcott	
The Adventures of Robinson Crusoe	C224-17	1977	Malvina G. Vogel	1719	Daniel Defoe	Originally Robinson Crusoe
The Three Musketeers	B224-15	1977	Malvina G. Vogel	1844	Alexandre Dumas	
The Wizard of Oz	224-8	1977	Deidre S. Laiken	1900	L. Frank Baum	Originally The Wonderful Wizard of Oz
David Copperfield	C224-23	1979	Malvina G. Vogel	1849	Charles Dickens	
Moby Dick	B224-16	1979	Shirley Bogart	1851	Herman Melville	
Oliver Twist	224-5	1979	Marian Leighton	1837	Charles Dickens	
Sherlock Holmes and the Case of The Hound of the Baskervilles	I224-65	1979	Malvina G. Vogel	1901	Arthur Conan Doyle	Originally The Hound of the Baskervilles
Tales of Mystery and Terror	E224-33	1979	Marjorie P. Katz		Edgar Allan Poe	Anthology including The Cask of Amontillado, The Gold Bug, The Fall of The House of Usher, and The Tell-Tale Heart
The Adventures of Huckleberry Finn	B224-14	1979	Deidre S. Laiken	1885	Mark Twain	
The Adventures of Tom Sawyer	224-6	1979	Deidre S. Laiken	1876	Mark Twain	
The Call of the Wild	224-3	1979	Mitsu Yamamoto	1903	Jack London	
The Count of Monte Cristo	D224-28	1979	Mitsu Yamamoto	1844	Alexandre Dumas	
The Last of the Mohicans	C224-24	1979	Eliza Gatewood Warren	1826	James Fenimore Cooper	
The Merry Adventures of Robin Hood	B224-13	1979	Deborah Kestel	1883	Howard Pyle	
The Mutiny on Board HMS Bounty	C224-19	1979	Deborah Kestel	1932	Charles Nordhoff and James Norman Hall	Originally The Mutiny on the Bounty
A Tale of Two Cities	D224-26	1983	Marian Leighton	1859	Charles Dickens	
Swiss Family Robinson	B224-11	1983	Eliza Gatewood Warren	1812	Johann David Wyss	
The Adventures of Sherlock Holmes	D224-25	1983	Malvina G. Vogel	1891	Arthur Conan Doyle	
The Man in the Iron Mask	I224-64	1983	Raymond H. Harris	1847	Alexandre Dumas	Originally The Vicomte of Bragelonne: Ten Years Later
The Prince and the Pauper	C224-22	1983	Shirley Bogart	1881	Mark Twain	
The Strange Case of Dr. Jekyll and Mr. Hyde	B224-10	1983	Mitsu Yamamoto	1886	Robert Louis Stevenson	
The Time Machine	D224-32	1983	Shirley Bogart	1895	H.G. Wells	
The War of the Worlds	G224-53	1983	Malvina G. Vogel	1898	H.G. Wells	
A Journey to the Center of the Earth	B224-9	1990	Howard J. Schwach	1864	Jules Verne	
The Red Badge of Courage	D224-27	1990	Malvina G. Vogel	1895	Stephen Crane	
Treasure Island	224-7	1990	Deidre S. Laiken	1883	Robert Louis Stevenson	
Captains Courageous	D224-29	1992	Malvina G. Vogel	1897	Rudyard Kipling	
Frankenstein	D224-30	1992	Malvina G. Vogel	1818	Mary Shelley	
Rebecca of Sunnybrook Farm	F224-48	1994	Eliza Gatewood Warren	1903	Kate Douglas Wiggin	
The Hunchback of Notre Dame	E224-36	1994	Malvina G. Vogel	1831	Victor Hugo	
The Jungle Book	E224-37	1994	Dan Johnson	1894	Rudyard Kipling	
The Secret Garden	E224-38	1994	Malvina G. Vogel	1911	Frances Hodgson Burnett	
The Wind in the Willows	E224-39	1994	Malvina G. Vogel	1908	Kenneth Grahame	
White Fang	E224-34	1994	Malvina G. Vogel	1906	Jack London	
Gulliver’s Travels	F224-41	1995	Saviour Pirotta	1726	Jonathan Swift	
Peter Pan	F224-46	1995	Marian Leighton	1911	J.M. Barrie	Originally Peter and Wendy
Pollyanna	F224-43	1995	Marian Leighton	1913	Eleanor H. Porter	
The Invisible Man	F224-44	1995	Malvina G. Vogel	1897	H.G. Wells	
The Legend of Sleepy Hollow and Rip Van Winkle	F224-45	1995	Jack Kelly	1820	Washington Irving	Originally The Legend of Sleepy Hollow
The Picture of Dorian Gray	F224-47	1995	Fern Siegel	1890	Oscar Wilde	
Dracula	G224-51	1996	Jack Kelly	1897	Bram Stoker	
King Solomon’s Mines	G224-54	1996	Jack Kelly	1885	H. Rider Haggard	
Pride and Prejudice	G224-52	1997	Fern Siegel	1813	Jane Austen	
Aesop’s Fables	H224-60	2000	Rochelle Larkin		Aesop	Original date(s) unknown
Beauty & The Beast and Other Stories	H224-56	2000	Rochelle Larkin	1756	Jeanne-Marie Leprince de Beaumont	Abridged version adapted from Gabrielle-Suzanne Barbot de Villeneuve's 1740 works
King Arthur and The Knights of the Round Table	D224-31	2000	Joshua E. Hanft	1903	Howard Pyle	
Sleeping Beauty and Other Stories	H224-59	2000	Rochelle Larkin			Unknown author(s); Originally The Sleeping Beauty in the Woods
The Little Mermaid and Other Stories	H224-58	2000	Rochelle Larkin	1837	Hans Christian Andersen	
Jane Eyre	I224-61	2004	Malvina G. Vogel	1847	Charlotte Brontë	
A Little Princess	224-66	2005	Eliza Gatewood Warren	1905	Frances Hodgson Burnett	
Cinderella and Other Stories	H224-57	2005	Rochelle Larkin	1812	Jacob and Wilhelm Grimm	Originally The Little Glass Slipper from Grimms' Fairy Tales
Grimm’s Fairy Tales	G224-49	2005	Roy Nemerson	1812	Jacob and Wilhelm Grimm	
Snow White and Other Stories	H224-55	2005	Rochelle Larkin	1812	Jacob and Wilhelm Grimm	Originally Snow White and the Seven Dwarfs in Grimms' Fairy Tales
The House of the Seven Gables		2005	Malvina G. Vogel	1851	Nathaniel Hawthorne	
The Phantom of the Opera	I224-62	2005	Shannon Donnelly	1909	Gaston Leroux	
Alice in Wonderland	G224-50	2012	Eliza Gatewood Warren	1865	Lewis Carroll	Originally Alice's Adventures in Wonderland
Hans Brinker	E224-40	2012	Malvina G. Vogel	1865	Mary Mapes Dodge	Originally Hans Brinker, or The Silver Skates
Anne of Green Gables	F224-42		Eliza Gatewood Warren	1908	Lucy Maud Montgomery	
Great Expectations	C224-21		Mitsu Yamamoto	1860	Charles Dickens	
Ivanhoe	E224-35		Malvina G. Vogel	1820	Walter Scott	

=== Additional titles ===
Title	Code on Spine	Publication Date	Adapter	Original Publication Date	Original Author	Notes
Christmas Bedtime Stories	226-3	1990	Claudia Vurnakes			Anthology of Christmas stories
Stories from the Bible: Old and New Testament	226-2	1990	Claudia Vurnakes, Mitsu Yamamoto			Anthology of selections from The Bible
A Christmas Carol	226-1	1990	Malvina G. Vogel	1843	Charles Dickens	

=== Heroes of America ===
- Daniel Boone
- Benjamin Franklin
- George Washington
- Babe Ruth
- Eleanor Roosevelt
- Clara Barton
- Martin Luther King
- Jackie Robinson

== See also ==
- Classics Illustrated
