= Norman Nodel =

American comic artist

- Born: Nochem Yeshaya; 1922
- Died: 25 February 2000 (aged 77–78) Hampton Roads, Virginia, U.S.
- Area: Comics artist

Norman Nodel (1922 – February 22, 2000) was an American comics artist, mostly known for his work in Classics Illustrated.

== Biography ==
Norman Nodel was born Nochem Yeshaya in 1922.

The son of an Orthodox Rabbi, Nodel served as a field artist in the U.S. Army, drawing military maps and other firsthand accounts of the war during World War II for which he received the Bronze Star medal. Many of his WWII illustrations are currently at the US Library of Congress.

During the 1940s, Nodel worked as assistant to George Marcoux, the newspaper cartoonist known for creating Supersnipe, and started creating comic-book art for True Comics and Sun Publications.

In Classics Illustrated, a comic book series that began in 1941 and featured adaptations of literary classics, he created the illustration for many issues, such as Ivanhoe, Faust, Lion of the North, Les Misérables, and The Invisible Man. In 1962, he illustrated Dr No, the Classics adaptation of the eponymous James Bond spy thriller. The same year, Nodel worked on the Classics' revised adaptation of The Man Who Laughs, where his artwork showed a Gwynplaine far more disfigured than the character's appearance in either the 1928 film or the 1950, original Classics edition. He received the Thomas Alva Edison Award for Best Children's Illustration circa 1960 for the Ten Commandments Classics Illustrated for which the Hollywood film starring Charlton Heston based their costume designs.

He began working, in 1988, for the Tzivos Hashem organisation and The Moshiach Times, a Jewish children's magazine, creating comics for the Jewish-American market, such as "Labels for Laibel" for Hachai Publishing.

Nodel died on 25 February 2000, after realizing his plan to visit Israel.
