= Rosenmund reduction =

Chemical reaction

Named after	Karl Wilhelm Rosenmund
Reaction type	Organic redox reaction

Identifiers
Organic Chemistry Portal	rosenmund-reduction
RSC ontology ID	RXNO:0000136

The Rosenmund reduction is a hydrogenation process in which an acyl chloride is selectively reduced to an aldehyde. The reaction was named after Karl Wilhelm Rosenmund, who first reported it in 1918.

The Rosenmund reduction

The reaction, a hydrogenolysis, is catalysed by palladium on barium sulfate, which is sometimes called the Rosenmund catalyst. Barium sulfate has a low surface area which reduces the activity of the palladium, preventing over-reduction. However, for certain reactive acyl chlorides the activity must be reduced further, by the addition of a poison. Originally this was thioquinanthrene although thiourea has also been used. Deactivation is required because the system must reduce the acyl chloride but not the subsequent aldehyde. If further reduction does take place, it will create a primary alcohol which would then react with the remaining acyl chloride to form an ester.

Rosenmund catalyst can be prepared by reduction of palladium(II) chloride solution in the presence of BaSO_{4}. Typical reducing agent is formaldehyde.

While Rosenmund reduction method can be used to prepare several aldehydes, formaldehyde cannot be prepared, as formyl chloride is unstable at room temperatures.

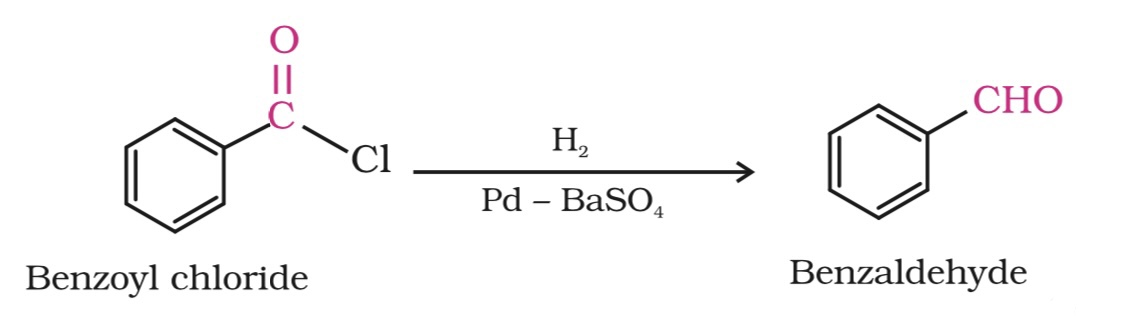

== See also ==
- Lindlar catalyst - Palladium on calcium carbonate with added catalytic poison, similar to the Rosenmund catalyst
- Grundmann aldehyde synthesis - Also reduces an acyl halide to an aldehyde, via the use of diazomethane
- Diisobutylaluminium hydride (DIBALH) can also reduce acid chlorides to aldehydes.
- Stephen aldehyde synthesis - Nitriles to aldehydes via reduction
