= Lillian Chestney =

American illustrator and painter

- Born: September 22, 1913; New York, U.S.
- Died: August 6, 2000 (aged 86)
- Education: Pratt Institute, Art Students League of New York
- Known for: Illustrator (children's books, comic books)
- Notable work: Arabian Nights, Alibaba and the Forty Thieves, Gulliver's Travels
- Spouse: Stanley Maxwell Zuckerberg
- Awards: Society of Illustrators for Best Advertisement of 1948, Citation for Merit from the Society of Illustrators in 1961 and 1965

Lillian Chestney (September 22, 1913 – August 6, 2000) was an American illustrator and painter. She studied in New York City and illustrated children's books, comic books (during the Golden Age of Comic Books), and magazine and book covers at a time when few women held artist positions in the industry.

Later in life she painted waterfront scenes in Eastern Canada and Northeastern America.

== Personal life ==
Lillian Chestney was born in 1913 and studied art in New York City. In the 1930s, she attended the Pratt Institute on an art scholarship and later studied at the Art Students League of New York. She married Stanley Maxwell Zuckerberg, who she met at Pratt, on June 22, 1941. Zuckerberg also studied at the Arts Students League and worked for Gilberton, using the name "Stanley Maxwell." The couple had shared career pursuits, both being artists and having worked as illustrators, and had a close relationship.

During World War II, Chestney's husband Stanley Zuckerberg was in the XXI Bomber Command's 58th Bombardment Wing.

In 1960 and 1964 Chestney lived in Levittown, New York.

== Career ==
Chestney worked as an illustrator and cartoonist in 1940s and 1950s, creating "highly skilled, realistic, and fanciful paintings."

=== Classic Comics illustrator ===
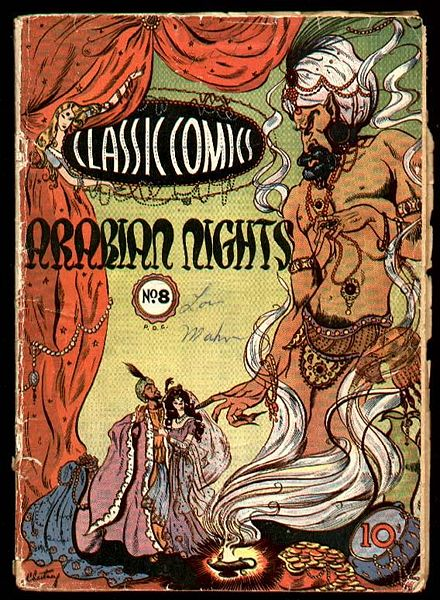
Lilian Chesney, "Arabian Nights," Classic Comics issue #8

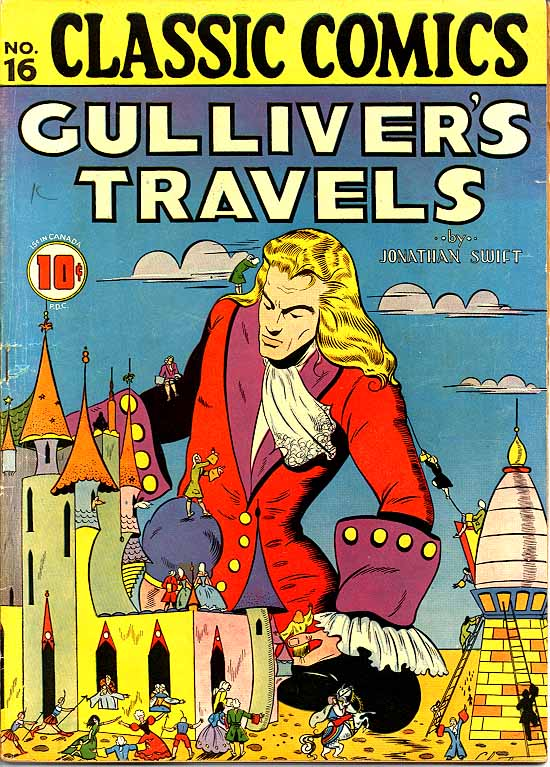
Lilian Chesney, "Gulliver's Travels," Classic Comics issue #16, December 1943

Chestney illustrated Arabian Nights, including the tales of "Aladdin and His Magic Lamp," "Alibaba and the Forty Thieves," "The Adventures of Sinbad the Sailor," and "The Story of the Magic Horse." Published in February 1943, it was the eighth issue in the Classic Comics series and her first illustrated comic book. It was released soon after the Hollywood movie of the same name, though of a different subject matter. The story was based on the collection of Middle Eastern folk tales, One Thousand and One Nights, from the Islamic Golden Age, in which Scheherazade postponed her execution by telling a new tale each night.

Chestney used an ornamented oval logo for the series. There was controversy on the jinn's portrayal on the cover. It was questioned if Chestney or the inker, Fred Eng, had intended on portraying pubic hair or a shadow above the jinn's loincloth. To avoid the controversy the Gilberton Company, Inc. (a later corporate identity of Classic Comics) removed the black blotch when the issue was reprinted in 1944.

Chestney's illustrations for Arabian Nights were praised for their fanciful and charming qualities. In 2011 Heritage Auctions valued an issue of Chestney's work for US$300. Chestney's version of Arabian Nights was last reissued in 1950. In 1961 a revision of Arabian Nights was printed in which Chestney's illustrations replaced with new artwork by Charles Berger. This revision has been criticized for lacking much of the charm in Chestney's adaptation and the form was strictly dictated by the editors with a structure of four or five panels a page. All panels were rectangular, as opposed to the oval and semi-circle panels Chestney used.

In 1943, Chestney illustrated the comic book based upon the first book of Jonathan Swift's Gulliver's Travels, "Voyage to Lilliput." It was Classic Comics 16th issue, published in December 1943. It was dropped from the reorder list for Classics Illustrated in 1954.

=== Other work ===
She created advertisements for cook books and music books and covers for paperback romance novels, but she specialized in illustrating children's books. Her and her husband's work were featured in magazines such as "McCall's", "The Saturday Evening Post", and "Collier's". The Signet Classic edition of Theodore Dreiser's An American Tragedy commissioned Chestney for a cover painting in 1964.

Later in life Chestney painted waterfront scenes of Nova Scotia and New England, based upon the vacations she had taken there with her husband.

=== List of works ===
A few of her works are:

Comic books

- "Arabian Nights". Comic Classics (8). Gilberton. February 1943.
- "Gulliver's Travels". Comic Classics (16). Gilberton. December 1943.

Other works

- Nelson, Mary Jarman; Tipton, Gladys, eds. (1951). Music for Early Childhood. New Music Horizon Series. Illustrator: Lillian Chestney and Ellen Simon. New York: Silver Burdett Company.
- Baker, Samm Sinclair (1958). Miracle Gardening ... Drawings by Lillian Chestney. Bantam Books.
- Waldo, Myra (1960). The complete book of oriental cooking. Illustrator: Lillian Chestney. D. McKay Co.

=== Awards and recognition ===
Chestney won contributions were recognized in commercial arts when she won the award from the Society of Illustrators for Best Advertisement of 1948. She also earned the Citation for Merit from the Society of Illustrators in 1961 and 1965.

She is in the Who's who in Commercial Art and Photography of 1960 and 1964.
