= Thioquinanthrene =

Names
- IUPAC name 2,13-Dithia-10,21-diazapentacyclo[12.8.0.0^{3,12}.0^{4,9}.0^{15,20}]docosa-1(14),3(12),4,6,8,10,15,17,19,21-decaene
- Other names Thiochinathren

Identifiers
| CAS Number | 50634-27-0 |
| 3D model (JSmol) | Interactive image |
| ChemSpider | 9046144 |
| PubChem CID | 10870863 |
- InChI: InChI=1S/C18H10N2S2/c1-3-7-13-11(5-1)17-15(9-19-13)22-18-12-6-2-4-8-14(12)20-10-16(18)21-17/h1-10H Key: KZQKWVYWXKNYAO-UHFFFAOYSA-N
- SMILES: C1=CC=C2C(=C1)C3=C(C=N2)SC4=C(S3)C=NC5=CC=CC=C54

Properties
| Chemical formula | C_{18}H_{10}N_{2}S_{2} |
| Molar mass | 318.41 g·mol^{−1} |
- Except where otherwise noted, data are given for materials in their standard state (at 25 °C [77 °F], 100 kPa). Infobox references

Thioquinanthrene, also known as thiochinathren, is an aromatic organic chemical compound. It has the chemical formula C_{18}H_{10}N_{2}S_{2} and reacts with alcoholates or alkoxides. One of the key uses is to act as a catalyst poison in the Rosenmund reduction. It has the IUPAC name of 2,13-dithia-10,21-diazapentacyclo[12.8.0.0^{3,12}.0^{4,9}.0^{15,20}]docosa-1(14),3(12),4,6,8,10,15,17,19,21-decaene.

== Rosenmund catalyst poison ==
In the Rosenmeund reaction, an acid chloride is reduced to an aldehyde. Continuing the reduction produces an alcohol. This further reaction is undesirable as the alcohol will now react with the acyl chloride to produce the unwanted ester product. For this reaction (over reduction) to be prevented, the catalyst needs to be poisoned. Thioquinanthrene was used initially, although other materials have been used since.
