= Edd Ashe =

American cartoonist

Edd Ashe, born Edmund Marion Ashe Jr., (August 11, 1908 – September 4, 1986) was a creator of comic strips and a comic book artist in the United States. He wrote the strip Guy Fortune that ran in the Pittsburgh Courier from August 19, 1950, until October 22, 1955. He also illustrated The American Weekly.

He was born in Norwalk, Connecticut. His father was an artist and head of Carnegie Tech's art department.

He was a white Golden Age comic book artist. He and Nathaniel Nitkin created Bomber Burns.

His second marriage was to Beatrice Bishop in 1941. She was the daughter of a prominent hotelier on Long Island and died February 8, 1983.

== Guy Fortune ==
The Guy Fortune comic strip was about a secret agent who was African American. It was pioneering. A 1955 strip features Fortune in Pakistan teaching a young prince baseball.
