= Arthur Grundmann =

German politician (1920–1987)

Member of the Bundestag
- In office 7 September 1949 – 7 September 1953

Personal details
- Born: 23 March 1920 (age 106) Herne
- Died: 16 August 1987 (aged 67)
- Party: FDP

Arthur Grundmann (23 March 1920 – 16 August 1987) was a German politician of the Free Democratic Party (FDP) and former member of the German Bundestag.

== Life ==
In the election to the first Bundestag in 1949, he was elected to parliament via the North Rhine-Westphalia state list. Grundmann was a full member of the Committee for Petitions, for Labour and from October 1950 to October 1951 also of the Committee for Borderland Issues.

== Literature ==
Herbst, Ludolf; Jahn, Bruno (2002). Vierhaus, Rudolf (ed.). Biographisches Handbuch der Mitglieder des Deutschen Bundestages. 1949–2002 [Biographical Handbook of the Members of the German Bundestag. 1949–2002] (in German). München: De Gruyter - De Gruyter Saur. p. 1715. ISBN 978-3-11-184511-1.
