= Grundman =

Grundman is a surname. Notable people with the surname include:

- Bernie Grundman, American audio engineer
- Clare Grundman (1913–1996), American band composer and arranger
- Helen G. Grundman, professor of mathematics at Bryn Mawr College
- Irving Grundman (1928–2021), former general manager of the Montreal Canadiens
- Ya'akov Grundman (1939–2004), Israeli footballer and manager

== See also ==
- Grundmann
- Grundig (surname)
