= Grundmann aldehyde synthesis =

Type of chemical reaction

The Grundmann aldehyde synthesis is a chemical reaction that produces an aldehyde from an acyl halide.

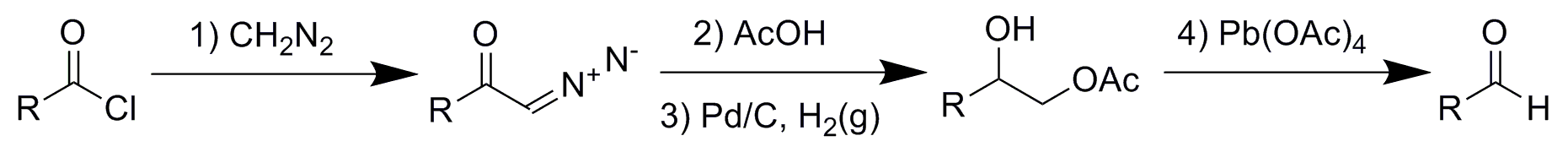
The Grundmann aldehyde synthesis

Because of the Rosenmund reduction and DIBAL-H accomplish similar transformations, this reaction sequence is not practiced much currently.
