= Trajectory Inc. =

American technology company

Trajectory, Inc.
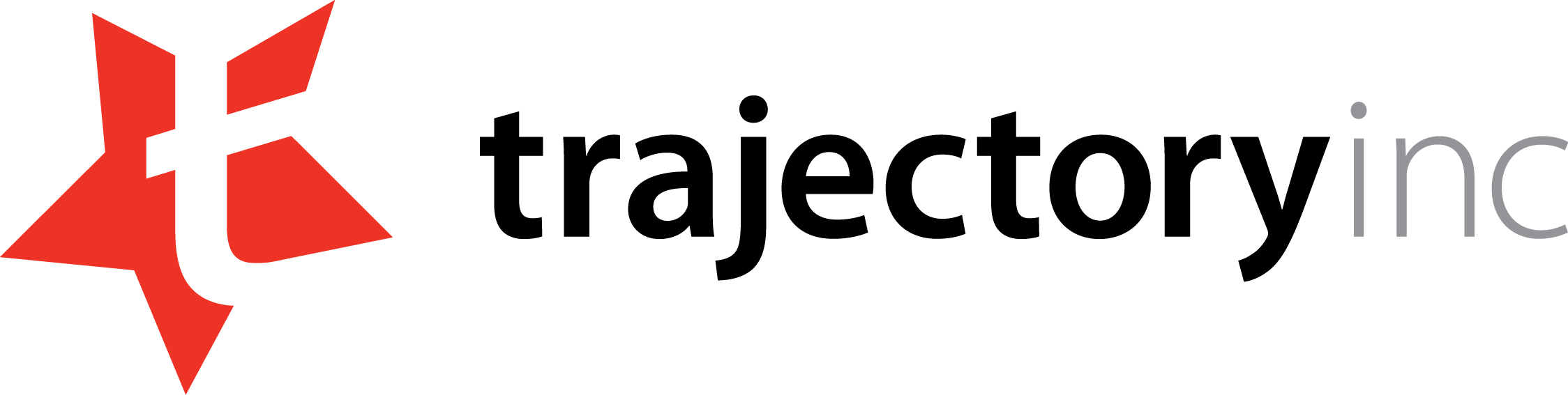
- Type: Corporation
- Industry: Publishing
- Founded: 2011; 15 years ago
- Founder: Jim Bryant
- Headquarters: Marblehead, Massachusetts, United States
- Area served: Global
- Services: Bookselling, Information Technology, Big Data, Natural Language Processing, Machine Learning
- Website: trajectoryinc.com

Trajectory is an American technology company that focuses on the global book publishing market. It was founded by Jim Bryant in 2011 and is headquartered in Marblehead, Massachusetts.

The company is known for developing a series of deep learning algorithms used to analyze and recommend books.

== History ==
Since its founding in 2011 by Jim Bryant has established relationships with over 300 eBook distributors worldwide. In 2013, the company acquired the assets of startup Small Demons, which gave them access to the HarperCollins’ e-book library for analysis and data extraction.

In 2014, the company invented a standardized way to compare and contrast the flow of sentiment through works of fiction.

In January 2015, Trajectory announced that it had invented a method to generate book recommendations based on the content of the book. It is believed to be the first company to successfully demonstrate this.

The company is also noted for its penetration in the Chinese e-book distribution market, where most notably it formed a pact with Tencent Literature in March 2015 to distribute over 200,000 Chinese titles in North and South American distribution channels and English titles across the Chinese company's customer base of 820 million active users. Also in the spring, Trajectory announced agreements with Chinese distributors Xiaomi and Dangdang.

Trajectory and Zhejiang Publishing United formed a global eBook distribution deal in October 2013.

In 2015, Trajectory announced agreements with Peoples Education Press, Zhejiang, Anhui, Diamond Comic Distributors, Gardners, the Association of American University Presses and others. In September of the same year, the company won the Book Industry Study Group's Industry Innovation Award for their re-imagination of and unique approach to the industry.

=== Publishers ===
Trajectory's publisher partners include include, Macmillan, Abrams, MIT Press, Peoples Education Press, Anhui, and Zhejiang publishing United.

=== Distributors ===
Trajectory's distributor partners include: Tencent Literature, Xiaomi, Dangdang, Apple, Barnes & Noble, Kobo, and over 300 other partners.

== Natural Language Processing and Machine Learning ==
In order to improve discoverability for books in publishing and distribution channels, Trajectory uses Natural Language Processing (NLP) and implements “Deep Learning” techniques that were the first of their kind to recommend books based on proprietary algorithms.

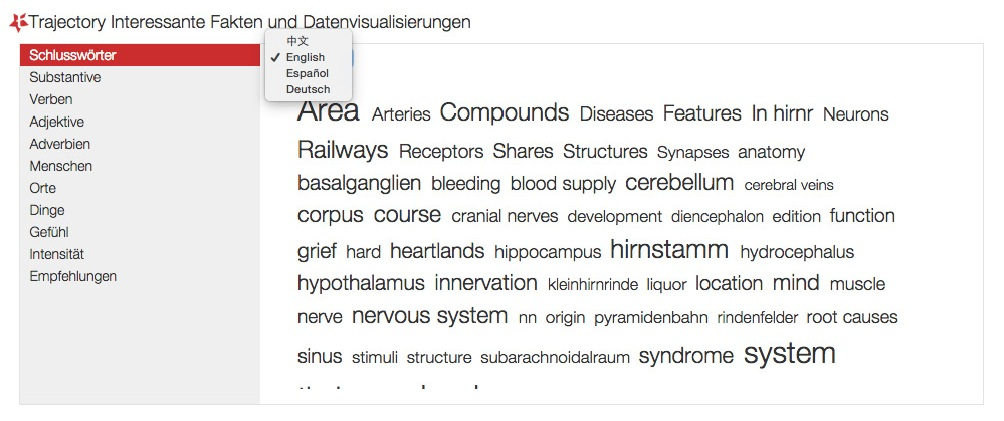
Trajectory NLP

These algorithms parse the text of the book and categorize data based on certain features like sentiment, parts of speech, genre, and keywords, and match it to the previously processed books in their database to generate suggestions. This content analysis contrasts current recommendation methods used by major companies like Amazon or Netflix that are powered by sales data and user reports. As the Natural Language Processing Engine parses more and more books in English, Chinese, Spanish, and German, the algorithms recommending capabilities improve transliterally.
