= Outsiders =

Outsiders or The Outsiders may refer to:

== Literature ==
=== Fiction ===
- Outsiders, an 1899 novel by Robert W. Chambers
- The Outsiders, a 1905 novel by Annie S. Swan
- The Outsiders, a 1945 novel by A. E. Martin; basis for the 1955 film The Glass Cage
- The Outsiders, a 1948 novel by Jane Abbott
- The Outsiders, a 1961 short story collection by Alexander Trocchi
- The Outsiders (novel), a 1967 novel by S. E. Hinton
- Outsiders, a 2005 short story collection by Kevin Crossley-Holland
- Outsiders: 22 All New Stories from the Edge, a 2005 short story anthology edited by Nancy Holder and Nancy Kilpatrick
- The Outsiders, a 2012 novel by Gerald Seymour

=== Non-fiction ===
- Outsiders: Studies in the Sociology of Deviance, a 1993 book by American sociologist Howard S. Becker
- The Outsiders: Alexander Trocchi and Kenneth White, a 1998 book by Gavin Bowd

=== Stage ===
- The Outsiders, a 1911 play by Charles Klein
- The Outsiders (musical), a 2023 musical based on S. E. Hinton's novel

=== Characters and concepts ===
- Outsiders (comics), a team of superheroes in the DC Universe
- Outsiders (Known Space), a fictional alien race created by Larry Niven
- a fictional species of magical creatures in Jim Butcher's The Dresden Files novels; see Cold Days

== Music ==
- The Outsiders (American band), a 1960s pop/rock group from Cleveland, USA
- The Outsiders (British band), a 1970s punk band
- The Outsiders (Dutch band), a 1960s beat/rock group
- The Outsiders (Tampa band), a 1960s American garage rock band
- Outsiders (album), a 2017 album by British punk rock band Gnarwolves
- The Outsiders (Needtobreathe album), 2009
  - "The Outsiders" (Needtobreathe song), 2009
- The Outsiders (Eric Church album), 2014
  - "The Outsiders" (Eric Church song), 2014
- "Outsiders", a song by Franz Ferdinand from You Could Have It So Much Better
- "Outsiders", a song by Suede from Night Thoughts
- "The Outsiders", a 2004 song by R.E.M. from Around the Sun
- "The Outsiders", a 2007 song by Athlete from Beyond the Neighbourhood

== Film ==
- Outsiders (1980 film), a South Korean film featuring Won Mi-kyung
- Outsiders (film), a 2022 American sci-fi thriller film
- The Outsiders (film), a 1983 film based on S. E. Hinton's novel, directed by Francis Ford Coppola
- The Outsiders (Mori to Mizuumi no Matsuri), a 1958 Japanese film directed by Tomu Uchida
- Bande à part (film) (English: Band of Outsiders or The Outsiders), a 1964 film directed by Jean-Luc Godard
- Los caifanes, a 1967 film directed by Juan Ibáñez, also released as The Outsiders
- Ceddo (film), a 1977 Senegalese film directed by Ousmane Sembène, also known as The Outsiders
- The Outsiders, a 1998 UK documentary, featuring Nick Hancock, about Iran in the World Cup

== Television ==
=== Shows ===
- Outsiders (American TV series), a drama series that aired in 2016 and 2017
- Outsiders (Australian TV program), an Australian news commentary program on Sky News Live
- Outsiders (British TV series), a British outdoor-themed panel show
- The Outsiders (American TV series), a 1990 American series based on characters from S. E. Hinton's novel that aired for one season
- The Outsiders (Australian TV series), a 1976 series starring Andrew Keir and Sascha Hehn
- Ha'Nephilim (English: The Outsiders), an Israeli drama and science fiction television show
- Primetime: The Outsiders, an American TV documentary news series
- The Outsiders (Taiwanese TV series), a 2004 Taiwanese TV drama
  - The Outsiders II, the 2004 sequel series
- Young Justice: Outsiders, the third season of the American animated superhero series Young Justice

=== Episodes ===
- "Chapter Eight: The Outsiders", a 2017 episode of Riverdale
- "Outsiders", a 2016 episode of Freakish
- "Outsiders", a 2008 episode of Gormiti
- "Outsiders", a 1992 episode of Heartbeat
- "Outsiders", a 2021 episode of Heartland
- "Outsiders", a 1984 episode of Hotel
- "Outsiders", a 1973 episode of Moonbase 3
- "Outsiders", a 1993 episode of Peak Practice
- "Outsiders", a 1985 episode of Robotech
- "Outsiders" (Spooks), a 2004 episode of Spooks
- "Outsiders", a 2008 episode of Stargate Atlantis
- "Outsiders" (The Unit), a 2007 episode of The Unit
- "The Outsiders", a 2019 episode of 24 Hours in A&E
- "The Outsiders", a 2000 episode of Any Day Now
- "The Outsiders", a 2018 episode of Articulate
- "The Outsiders", a 1999 episode of Ballykissangel
- "The Outsiders", a 1989 episode of Beauty and the Beast
- "The Outsiders", a 2011 episode of Covert Affairs
- "The Outsiders", a 1979 episode of Dallas
- "The Outsiders", a 1998 episode of DogTown
- "The Outsiders", a 1998 episode of Flipper
- "The Outsiders", a 2026 episode of Full Swing
- "The Outsiders", a 2005 episode of Holby City
- "The Outsiders", a 2012 episode of I Married a Mobster
- "The Outsiders", a 1988 episode of MacGyver
- "The Outsiders", a 1975 episode of Petrocelli
- "The Outsiders", a 2020 episode of Ruthless
- "The Outsiders", a 2016 episode of The Circus: Inside the Greatest Political Show on Earth
- "The Outsiders", a 1976 episode of The Duchess of Duke Street
- "The Outsiders", a 2018 episode of The Paynes

== Other uses ==
- Outsiders (professional wrestling), a professional wrestling tag team

== See also ==
- Neurotic Outsiders, a supergroup
- Outsider (disambiguation)
- The Outsider (disambiguation)
- The Outside (disambiguation)
