= Long arm =

Long arm or The Long Arm can refer to:

- The Long Arm (film), a 1956 British film
- The Long Arm (TV series), an Australian TV series
- Yuri Dolgorukiy (c. 1099–1157), the first Rurikid prince to rule in the northern territory of Rostov
- Operation Long Arm (Israel), Israeli airstrike against the Houthi organization in Yemen in 2024

== See also ==
- Long-arm jurisdiction, a legal principle
- Long arm of Ankara, a political term concerning Turkish foreign policy
- Longarm (disambiguation)
- Long Arm of the Law (disambiguation)
