= Invid Invasion =

Invid Invasion may refer to:

- A title used in several works of the Robotech fictional universe:
  - The first episode of the third season, see List of Robotech episodes
  - The fictional event, see Third Robotech War
  - The #10 novel, see Robotech (novels)
  - Robotech: Invasion, a video game
