= Outsider =

Outsider may refer to:

== Film ==
- Outsider (1997 film), a Slovene-language film
- Outsider (2012 film), a Malayalam-language Indian film

== Literature ==
=== Fiction ===
- Outsider, a 1987 novel by Sara Craven
- Outsider, a 1993 novel by John Francome
- Outsider, a 2006 novel by Diana Palmer

=== Characters and concepts ===
- Outsider (Known Space), a fictional species in Larry Niven's Known Space universe
- Outsider (comics), a character in various DC Comics storylines

=== Other ===
- Outsider, a pseudonym used by Aarne Haapakoski

== Music ==
- Outsider music, a category of music independent of the music industry
- Outsider (rapper), a South Korean speed rapper

=== Albums ===
- Outsider (Three Days Grace album), 2018
- Outsider (Uriah Heep album), 2014
- Outsider (Sid album), 2014
- Outsider (Comeback Kid album), 2017
- Outsider (Roger Taylor album), 2021
- Outsider, 2007 album by the Restarts

=== Songs ===
- "Outsider" (Cliff Richard song), a song written by Roy C. Bennett and Sid Tepper and recorded by Cliff Richard
- "Outsider", by Chumbawamba from Tubthumper
- "Outsider", by Jessie Malakouti
- "Outsider", by Juliana Hatfield from Only Everything
- "Outsider", by Ramones from Subterranean Jungle
- "Outsider", by Underoath from The Place After This One

== Television ==
- "Outsider" (Law & Order: Special Victims Unit), an episode of Law & Order: Special Victims Unit
- "Outsider", an episode of Super Dimension Cavalry Southern Cross
- "Outsider", an episode of Super Dimension Century Orguss

== Other uses ==
- Outsider (painting), a 1988 painting by Australian artist Gordon Bennett
- Outsider (Dungeons & Dragons), a creature (type) in the role-playing game Dungeons & Dragons
- In the emic and etic perspectives in ethnography and social science, the outsider or etic approach
- Outsider, LGBTQ slang

== See also ==
- Outsiders (disambiguation)
- The Outsider (disambiguation)
- Outside (disambiguation)
- Outsider art, created by artists working outside the mainstream art world
