= The Outsider =

The Outsider may refer to:

== Film ==
- The Outsider (1917 film), an American film directed by William C. Dowlan
- The Outsider (1926 film), an American film directed by Rowland V. Lee
- The Outsider (1931 film), a film starring Joan Barry
- The Outsider (1939 film), a film starring George Sanders
- The Outsider (1948 film) or The Guinea Pig, a British film starring Richard Attenborough
- The Outsider (1961 film), directed by Delbert Mann and starring Tony Curtis
- The Outsider, a TV film and series pilot starring Darren McGavin; became a series in the 1968–69 season
- The Outsider (1979 film), a film starring Craig Wasson
- The Outsider (Le marginal) (1983), a film starring Jean-Paul Belmondo
- The Outsider (1998 film) or Gangster World, a science fiction TV movie
- The Outsider (2002 film), a western starring Tim Daly and Naomi Watts
- The Outsider (2005 film), a 2005 documentary directed by Nicholas Jarecki, featuring Bijou Phillips and others
- The Outsider (2014 film), an action crime film starring Craig Fairbrass, James Caan and Shannon Elizabeth
- The Outsider (2018 film), an action crime film starring Jared Leto
- The Outsider (2019 film), a western starring Jon Foo and Trace Adkins

== Literature ==
- The Outsider, an 1886 novel by Henry Hawley Smart
- The Outsider, a 1921 novel by Maurice Samuel
- "The Outsider" (short story), a 1926 short story by H. P. Lovecraft
- The Outsider and Others (1939), the first major collection of stories by Lovecraft
- The Outsider (Camus novel) or The Stranger (L'Étranger), a 1942 novel by Albert Camus
- The Outsider (Wright novel), a 1953 novel by Richard Wright
- The Outsider (Colin Wilson), a 1956 book by Colin Wilson
- The Outsider, a 1961 novel by Monica Edwards
- The Outsider, a 1969 novel by Lou Cameron, based on the 1968 TV series
- The Outsider, a 1973 novel by Giles A. Lutz
- The Outsider, a 1984 novel by Howard Fast
- The Outsider, a 1992 novel by Barbara Delinsky
- The Outsider, a 1996 novel by Elizabeth Lambert (written as Penelope Williamson), basis for the 2002 film
- The Outsider, a 1998 novel by Melinda Letz; the first book in the Roswell High series
- The Outsider, a 2004 novel by Cory Martin, based on the TV series The O.C.
- The Outsider, a 2013 novel by Chris Culver
- The Outsider, a 2013 novel by Arlene Hunt
- The Outsider: My Life in Intrigue, a 2015 autobiography by Frederick Forsyth
- The Outsider (King novel), a 2018 novel by Stephen King
- The Outsider, a character in the 1987 novel Watchers by Dean Koontz
- The Outsider (play), a 1923 play by Dorothy Brandon; basis for 1926, 1931, and 1939 films (see above) and other adaptations
- The Outsider (magazine), a 1960s literary magazine

== Music ==
- The Outsider Festival, a Scottish music and comedy festival

=== Albums ===
- The Outsider (CL Smooth album), 2007
- The Outsider (DJ Shadow album), 2006
- The Outsider, by Davy Knowles, 2014
- The Outsider, by Numen, 2025

=== Songs ===
- "The Outsider" (song), a 2003 song by A Perfect Circle
- "The Outsider", by Black Country Communion from 2
- "The Outsider", by Black Veil Brides from Vale
- "The Outsider", by Blur, a b-side of "Crazy Beat"
- "The Outsider", by Ian Hunter from You're Never Alone with a Schizophrenic
- "The Outsider", by Marina and the Diamonds from The Family Jewels
- "The Outsider", by Uriah Heep from Outsider

== Television ==
=== Series ===
- The Outsider (1968 TV series), a US series starring Darren McGavin
- The Outsider (1983 TV series), a UK series starring John Duttine
- The Outsider (miniseries), a 2020 series based on the Stephen King novel

=== Episodes ===
- "The Outsider", a 1966 episode of 12 O'Clock High
- "The Outsider", a 1982 episode of A.J. Wentworth, B.A.
- "The Outsider", a 1956 episode of Armchair Theatre
- "The Outsider", a 1966 episode of Combat!
- "The Outsider" (The Dead Zone)
- "The Outsider", a 1962 episode of The Detectives
- "The Outsider", a 2013 episode of Hardcore Pawn
- "The Outsider", a 1986 episode of Head of the Class
- "The Outsider", a 1959 episode of M Squad
- "The Outsider", a 1974 episode of The Mary Tyler Moore Show
- "The Outsider", a 1983 episode of Matt Houston
- "The Outsider" (The O.C.)
- "The Outsider" (Once Upon a Time)
- "The Outsider", a 2024 episode of Quantum Leap
- "The Outsider" (Rubicon)
- "The Outsider", a 1979 episode of The Waltons
- "The Outsider", a 2005 episode of The Zula Patrol

== Video games ==
- The Outsider (video game), a canceled action-adventure game
- The Outsider (Dishonored), a character in the Dishonored video game franchise

== See also ==
- Outsider (disambiguation)
- Outsiders (disambiguation)
