= Yoram Yosefsberg =

Israeli actor (born 1963)

- יורם יוספסברג
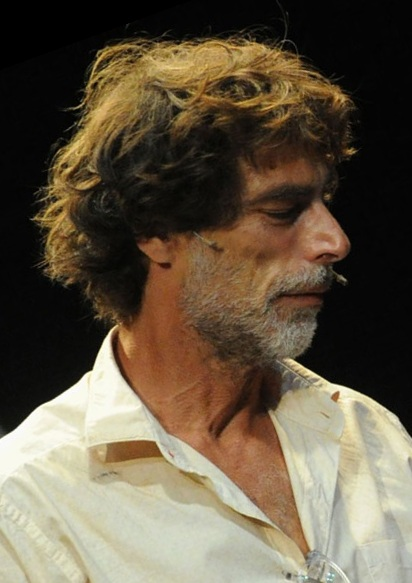
- Yosefsberg in 2010
- Born: 2 May 1963 (age 63); Tel Aviv, Israel
- Occupations: Actor; voice actor; announcer
- Years active: 1990–present

Yoram Yosefsberg (Hebrew: יורם יוספסברג; born 2 May 1963) is an Israeli actor and voice actor.

== Biography ==
Yosefsberg's voice is best known for his dubbing works in many animated TV shows and feature films, including Megatron in the Transformers series, Gantu in the Lilo & Stitch series, and Major Monogram in Phineas and Ferb. As an actor, Yosefberg portrayed cops in Teddy Productions series such as Shemesh, HaPijamot and Ha'Nephilim.

Yosefsberg also provided a voice role in a game called Counter-Strike: Global Offensive as the IDF on the Counter Terrorist team, they appear in the maps called "Dust", "Dust 2" and "Shortdust".

== Filmography ==
=== Dubbing ===
==== Animation and live-action TV ====
- A.T.O.M. (Additional Characters)
- Adventure Time (Death)
- Adventures of Sonic the Hedgehog (Dr. Robotnik)
- American Dragon: Jake Long (Fu Dog)
- Anatole (Additional Characters)
- Angel's Friends (Malachi)
- Angelina Ballerina (Additional Voices (Season 1))
- Animalia (Tyrannicus)
- Anne of Green Gables (Jerry, Additional Characters)
- Atomic Betty (Maximus I.Q.)
- Avatar: The Last Airbender (Additional Characters)
- Avenger Penguins (Caractacus P. Doom (2nd Voice))
- Babar and the Adventures of Badou (Lord Rataxes)
- Back at the Barnyard (Goat, Additional Characters)
- Bakugan Battle Brawlers
  - Bakugan: New Vestroia (Gorem, Helios, Elico)
  - Bakugan: Gundalian Invaders (Aranaut)
  - Bakugan: Mechtanium Surge (Taylean, Helios, Zenthon, Jaakor, Mutabird, Tremblar, Chromopod)
- Batman
  - Batman: The Animated Series (Killer Croc)
  - Batman Beyond (Mr. Fixx)
  - The Batman (Additional Characters)
  - Batman: The Brave and the Bold (Aquaman (Season 1), Two-Face, various voices)
- Ben 10
  - Ben 10 (Diamondhead, Vilgax, Hex, Additional Characters)
  - Ben 10: Alien Force (Diamondhead, Vilgax)
  - Ben 10: Omniverse (Vilgax, Proctor Servantis, Diamondhead, Additional Characters)
- Ben and Holly's Little Kingdom (Narrator, Additional Characters)
- Bigfoot Presents: Meteor and the Mighty Monster Trucks (Bigfoot)
- Bobobo-bo Bo-bobo (Captain Battleship)
- Bolts & Blip (Ti-Grr Jaxxon)
- Bratz (Additional Characters)
- Buzz Lightyear of Star Command (Warp Darkmatter)
- Cars Toons: Mater's Tall Tales (Additional Characters)
- Cedric (Additional Voices)
- Daigunder (Daigunder, Bullion)
- Dennis the Menace (Ruff (2nd Voice), Additional Characters)
- Digimon Series
  - Digimon Adventure 02 (Narrator, BlackWarGreymon, MaloMyotismon, Additional Voices)
  - Digimon Tamers (Mitsuo Yamaki (episodes 41 onwards), Zhuqiaomon)
  - Digimon Frontier (Grumblemon, Duskmon)
  - Digimon Data Squad (Commander Sampson, Additional Voices)
  - Digimon Fusion (Tactimon, Additional Voices)
- Dora the Explorer (Additional Characters (Season 1))
- Dragon Ball Z (Dodoria, Burter, Nappa (Episode 104), Android 16, West Kaiou (1st Voice), Spopovitch)
- Dragon Ball GT (General Rilldo)
- Dragon Ball Super (Beerus)
- Dragon Booster (Word Paynn)
- Eliot Kid (Additional Characters)
- Fanboy & Chum Chum (Mr. Hank Mufflin)
- Fantastic Four: World's Greatest Heroes (Doctor Doom)
- Finley the Fire Engine (Suds)
- Fireman Sam (Trevor Evans)
- Flipper & Lopaka (Bomana, Nip)
- Foster's Home for Imaginary Friends (Additional Characters (Season 1))
- Gadget & the Gadgetinis (Colonel Nozzaire)
- Galactic Football (General Bleylock (2nd Voice))
- Generator Rex (Bobo Haha, Skalamander)
- Geronimo Stilton (Additional Characters)
- Gormiti (Additional Characters)
- Growing Up Creepie (Vincent "Vinnie" Creecher)
- Henry Hugglemonster (Grando, Eduardo Enormomonster)
- Hi Hi Puffy AmiYumi (Additional Characters)
- Horseland (Old Horse)
- Hot Wheels Battle Force 5 (Captain Kalus, Kyrosys, Zeke)
- Inami (Phintos)
- Inspector Gadget (Dr. Claw (2nd Voice), Corporal Capeman, MAD Agents and Additional Characters)
- Jack's Big Music Show (Additional Characters)
- Jackie Chan Adventures (Ratso)
- Jacob Two-Two (Leo Louse, Hooded Fang)
- Johnny Test (Mr. Black, The General, Mr. Henry Teacherman, Additional Characters)
- Jimmy Two-Shoes (Additional Characters)
- Jungle Junction (Dozer)
- Justice League (Additional Characters)
- Justice League Unlimited (Additional Characters)
- Kassai and Leuk (Additional Characters)
- Kid Paddle (Additional Characters)
- Kim Possible (Dr. James Timothy Possible, Steven Barkin, Additional Characters)
- Kung Fu Panda: Legends of Awesomeness (Temutai, Additional Characters)
- LazyTown (Robbie Rotten)
- League of Super Evil (Additional Characters)
- Legion of Super Heroes (Additional Characters)
- Leonard (Additional Characters)
- Lilo & Stitch: The Series (Gantu, Additional Characters)
  - Stitch! (Gantu, Additional Characters)
- Martin Morning (Additional Characters)
- Medabots (Dr. Meta-Evil, Space Medafighter X (Season 1), Seaslug (Season 2))
- MegaMan NT Warrior (Masa, GutsMan, TorchMan, HeatMan, PlanetMan, DrillMan, Additional Characters)
- Mickey Mouse (Goofy)
- Mickey Mouse Clubhouse (Goofy)
- Minnie's Bow-Toons (Goofy)
- Monster Allergy (Magnacat, Narrator)
- Mr. Bogus (Dirt Dudes)
- Muddle Earth (Dr. Cuddles)
- My Friends Tigger & Pooh (Eeyore)
- Naruto (Additional Characters)
- Oban Star-Racers (Additional Characters)
- Once Upon a Time... The Discoverers (The Pest)
- Once Upon a Time... Space (Additional Characters)
- One Piece (Roronoa Zoro, Gold Roger, Zeff, Gaimon, Additional Characters)
- Oobi (Grampu)
- Phineas and Ferb (Major Monogram, Norm, Grandpa Clyde, Grandpa Reginald, Candace Flynn (Allergy Voice), Additional Characters)
  - Take Two with Phineas and Ferb (Howie Mandel, Tom Bergeron)
- Pink Panther and Sons (Additional Characters)
- Pippi Longstocking (Capt. Longstocking)
- Pokémon Series
  - Pokémon: The Johto Journeys (Mr. Parker/Gligarman, Kurt)
  - Pokémon: Advanced Battle (Maxie)
- Popeye and Son (Bluto)
- Power Rangers Lost Galaxy (Damon Henderson/Green Lost Galaxy Ranger (Reggie Rolle))
- Pucca (Master Soo, Santa Claus, Policeman Bruce)
- Redakai: Conquer the Kairu (Lokar)
- Sgt. Frog (Giroro, Kogoro, Viper, Masayoshi Yoshiokadaira (Season 1), Narrator, Additional Characters)
- Sitting Ducks (Additional Characters)
- Shaman King (Ryu, Mosuke (1st Voice))
- Shaolin Wuzang (Additional Characters)
- Shinzo (Hakuba, Lanancuras, Narrator (First Episode))
- SimsalaGrimm (Magic Book, Narrator (Season 2), Additional Characters)
- Skunk Fu! (Dragon, Mr. Fish, Praying Mantis)
- Slugterra (Dr. Thaddius Blakk)
- Sonic X (Chuck Thorndyke, Dark Oak, Additional Characters)
- Spider-Man Series
  - Spider-Man Unlimited (High Evolutionary)
  - Ultimate Spider-Man (Stan the Janitor, Doctor Doom)
- Spike Team (Additional Characters)
- SpongeBob SquarePants (Mermaid Man (Episode 67), The Flying Dutchman (Episode 70), Patchy the Pirate (Episode 93), Additional Characters)
- Strange Hill High (Additional Characters)
- Supa Strikas (Coach, Spenza)
- Super Pig (Theodorix Pig)
- Tara Duncan: The Evil Empress (Master Chem)
- Teenage Mutant Ninja Turtles (1987 TV series) (Bebop (2nd Voice), Lord Dregg)
- Teenage Mutant Ninja Turtles (2003 TV series) (Master Khan, Additional Characters)
- The Adventures of Tintin (Captain Haddock)
- The Avengers: Earth's Mightiest Heroes (Bruce Banner / Hulk)
- The Emperor's New School (Pacha, Kavo, Additional Characters)
- The Fantastic Voyages of Sinbad the Sailor (Additional Characters)
- The Jungle Book (Shere Khan)
- The Legend of Snow White (Goldie, Samson, King Conrad)
- The Legend of Tarzan (Additional Characters)
- The Life and Times of Juniper Lee (Loki, Stephen "Steve" the Sandman)
- The Magician (Black Jack)
- The New Adventures of Lucky Luke (Additional Characters)
- The Penguins of Madagascar (Joey, Bada, Max, The Rat King, Additional Characters)
- The Powerpuff Girls (Ace, Valhallen (Episode 44), Additional Voices)
- The Power Team (Mr. Big)
- The Ren & Stimpy Show (Muddy Mudskipper, Powdered Toast Man, Mr Horse and Additional Characters)
- The Replacements (Conrad Fleem, Additional Characters)
- The Super Hero Squad Show (Doctor Doom)
- The Sylvester & Tweety Mysteries (Hector)
- TigerSharks
- Tinga Tinga Tales (Lion)
- Tokyo Mew Mew (Professor Shirogane)
- Tom & Jerry Kids (Additional Characters)
- Totally Spies! (Additional Characters)
- Transformers Series (Megatron, Galvatron (Except Animated and PrimeOnly))
  - The Transformers
  - Transformers: Robots in Disguise (Fortress Maximus, Rollbar)
  - Transformers: Armada
  - Transformers: Cybertron
  - Transformers Animated (Ratchet (Episode 6, First Line Only))
  - Transformers: Prime
- T.U.F.F. Puppy (The Chief)
- Turbo Dogs (GT)
- Ultimate Book of Spells (Zarlack)
- Viewtiful Joe (Inferno Lord Fire Leo, Almighty Leader)
- What's New, Scooby-Doo? (Additional Characters)
- Winx Club (Mike, Baltor, Additional Characters)
- Yin Yang Yo! (The Night Master, Ultimoose)
- Yo-kai Watch (Whisper)
- Young Justice (Sportsmaster, Additional Characters)

==== Animated and live-action films/direct-to-video films ====
- 101 Dalmatians II: Patch's London Adventure (Additional Voices)
- 9 (8/Eight)
- Alice in Wonderland (Jabberwocky, Frog Servant)
- An American Tail: Fievel Goes West (Cat R. Waul)
- Andre (Billy Baker (Keith Szarabajka))
- Anastasia (Additional Voices)
- Animals United (Socrates the Lion)
- Arthur and the Invisibles (Chief (Jean Betote Njamba))
  - Arthur and the Revenge of Maltazard (Chief (Jean Betote Njamba))
  - Arthur 3: The War of the Two Worlds (Chief (Jean Betote Njamba))
- Astro Boy (Robotsky)
- Atlantis: The Lost Empire (Jebidiah Allerdyce "Cookie" Farnsworth)
- Babar: The Movie (Rataxes)
- Barnyard (Miles)
- Bartok the Magnificent (Zozi)
- Batman Film Series
  - Batman: Mask of the Phantasm (Thug)
  - The Batman vs. Dracula (Additional Voices)
- Battle For Terra (General Hemmer)
- Bee Movie (Additional Voices)
- Ben 10: Secret of the Omnitrix (Vilgax)
- Ben 10: Destroy All Aliens (Diamondhead)
- Ben 10/Generator Rex: Heroes United (Diamondhead)
- Beverly Hills Chihuahua (Delgado)
- Bionicle 2: Legends of Metru Nui (Toa Lhikan)
- Bolt (Additional Voices)
- Buzz Lightyear of Star Command: The Adventure Begins (Warp Darkmatter)
- Brave (King Fergus)
- Brother Bear (Moose 1#)
- Brother Bear 2 (Additional Voices)
- Camp Rock 2: The Final Jam (Axel Turner (Daniel Kash))
- Cars (Harv)
  - Cars 2 (Rod "Torque" Redline, Crabby the Boat, Additional Voices)
- Cats & Dogs: The Revenge of Kitty Galore (Sam, Cat Inamte, Bomb Squirrel)
- Chicken Little ("Ace")
- City of Ember (Additional Voices)
- Cloudy with a Chance of Meatballs (Officer Earl Devereaux)
- Coraline (Additional Voices)
- Daffy Duck's Fantastic Island (The Wishing Well)
- Digimon: The Movie (Wendigomon, Antylamon, Cherubimon)
- Dinotopia: Quest for the Ruby Sunstone (Albagon, T-Rex)
- Dinosaur (Kron)
- Dolphin Tale (Fisherman (Richard Libertini))
- Dragon Ball Movies
  - Dragon Ball: Mystical Adventure (Master Shen)
  - Dragon Ball Z: Dead Zone (Nicky)
  - Dragon Ball Z: The World's Strongest (Misokatsun)
  - Dragon Ball Z: Cooler's Revenge (Cooler)
  - Dragon Ball Z: Return of Cooler (Meta Cooler)
  - Dragon Ball Z: Super Android 13! (Android 15)
- Dragon Hunters (Lord Arnold)
- El Cid: The Legend (Ben Yussuf)
- Ella Enchanted (Koopootuk (Alvaro Lucchesi), Additional Voices)
- Enchanted (Additional Voices)
- Everyone's Hero (Additional Voices)
- Finding Nemo (Bruce)
- Flushed Away (Additional Voices)
- Fly Me to the Moon (Additional Voices)
- Free Willy (Dwight Mercer (Mykelti Williamson)
- Gnomeo & Juliet (Terrafirminator V.O.)
- Happily N'Ever After (Big Chef, Dwarves Leader)
- Happy Feet (Boss Skua)
  - Happy Feet Two (Boss Skua)
- Harry Potter and the Chamber of Secrets (Aragog)
- Home on the Range (Junior the Buffalo)
- Hoodwinked! (Chief Ted Grizzly)
- Hop (Hugh Hefner, Jimmy Carter of The Blind Boys of Alabama)
- How to Train Your Dragon (Viking Voices)
- Howl's Moving Castle (Additional Voices)
- Ice Age (franchise) (Diego)
  - Ice Age
  - Ice Age: The Meltdown
  - Ice Age: Dawn of the Dinosaurs
  - Ice Age: A Mammoth Christmas
  - Ice Age: Continental Drift
- Igor (Buzz Offman)
- Joseph: King of Dreams (Pharaoh)
- Kronk's New Groove (Papi)
- Kung Fu Panda (Tai Lung)
  - Kung Fu Panda 2 (Po's Father)
- Kung Fu Panda 3 (Kai)
- Legend of the Guardians: The Owls of Ga'Hoole (Metal Beak)
- Legends of Valhalla: Thor (Odin)
- Lilo & Stitch (film series)
  - Lilo & Stitch (Gantu)
  - Stitch! The Movie (Gantu)
- Madagascar: Escape 2 Africa (Teetsi, Additional Voices)
- Mary Poppins (Additional Voices)
- Megamind (Additional Voices)
- Mars Needs Moms (Additional Voices)
- Midsummer Dream (Demetrius)
- Monster House (Additional Voices)
- Monsters vs. Aliens (Additional Voices)
- My Little Pony: The Movie (Grundle King, The Smooze)
- Niko & The Way to the Stars (Dasher)
- Nim's Island (Additional Voices)
- Open Season (film series) (Ian)
  - Open Season
  - Open Season 2
- ParaNorman (Additional Voices)
- Phineas and Ferb the Movie: Across the 2nd Dimension (Major Francis Monogram/Monogram-2, Norm/Norm-2, Candace-2 (Allergy Voice), Additional Voices)
- Peter Pan (Pirates)
- Planes (Skipper Riley)
- Planet 51 (General Grawl)
- Pokémon Movie Series:
  - Pokémon: The First Movie (Giovanni)
  - Pokémon: The Movie 2000 (Slowking)
  - Pokémon 3: The Movie (Doctor Spencer Hale/Entei)
  - Pokémon: Arceus and the Jewel of Life (Damos)
- Racing Stripes (Tucker)
- Rango (Rattlesnake Jake)
- Ratatouille (Horst)
- Robots (Fire Hydrant)
- Rock-a-Doodle (The Grand Duke)
- Sammy's Adventures: The Secret Passage (Additional Voices)
- Scary Godmother: Halloween Spooktacular (Harry the Werewolf)
- Shark Bait (Nerissa)
- Sharpay's Fabulous Adventure (Vance Evans (Robert Curtis Brown)
- Shrek Series (Big Bad Wolf)
  - Shrek 2 (Additional Voices)
  - Shrek the Third (Additional Voices)
  - Shrek the Halls
  - Shrek Forever After (Brogan the Ogre)
- Sinbad: Beyond the Veil of Mists (Mustafa, Guard Captain)
- Sinbad: Legend of the Seven Seas (Additional Voices)
- Space Buddies (Additional Voices)
- Space Chimps (Houston)
  - Space Chimps 2: Zartog Strikes Back (Houston)
- Space Jam (Monstar Pound, Larry Johnson)
- Speed Racer (Racer X (Matthew Fox))
- Spirit: Stallion of the Cimarron (Additional Voices)
- Spirited Away (Additional Voices)
- Spy Kids 2: The Island of Lost Dreams (Romero (Steve Buscemi))
- Spy Kids 3-D: Game Over (Romero (Steve Buscemi), Isador "Machete" Cortez (Danny Trejo), Alexander Minion (Tony Shalhoub))
- Stuart Little (Race Announcer)
- Stuart Little 2 (Falcon)
- Surf's Up (Tank "The Shredder" Evans)
- Tangled (Stabbington brother)
- Tarzan II (Uto)
- The Adventures of Tintin (Captain Haddock)
- The Angry Birds Movie 2 (Hank)
- The Ant Bully (Stan Beals)
- The Boy Who Wanted to Be a Bear (Papa Bear, Buffalo, Spirit of the Wind)
- The Cat in the Hat (Additional Voices)
- The Chronicles of Narnia (film series)
  - The Chronicles of Narnia: The Lion, the Witch and the Wardrobe (Father Christmas (James Cosmo))
  - The Chronicles of Narnia: Prince Caspian (Lord Sopespian (Damian Alcazar))
  - The Chronicles of Narnia: The Voyage of the Dawn Treader (Aslan)
- The Gruffalo (The Gruffalo)
  - The Gruffalo's Child (The Gruffalo)
- The Hunchback of Notre Dame II (Sarousch)
- The Incredibles (Rick Dicker)
  - Jack-Jack Attack (Rick Dicker)
- The Jungle Book 2 (Additional Voices)
- The Legend of Secret Pass (Calabar)
- The Little Mermaid: Ariel's Beginning (Ray-Ray)
- The Muppets (Tex Richman (Chris Cooper))
- The Polar Express (Elf)
- The Powerpuff Girls Movie (Ace)
- The Princess and the Frog (James)
- The Real Shlemiel (Lekish, Tudras)
- The Road to El Dorado (Tzekel-Kan)
- The Simpsons Movie (Arnold Schwarzenegger)
- The Spiderwick Chronicles (Red Cap)
- The SpongeBob SquarePants Movie (Victor (Thug Club Leader), Additional Voices)
- The Swan Princess II: Escape from Castle Mountain (Knuckles)
- The Sword in the Stone (Sir Ector)
- The Tale of Despereaux (Additional Voices)
- The Three Musketeers (Comte de Rochefort)
- The Transformers: The Movie (Perceptor, Megatron, Galvatron)
- The Ugly Duckling and Me! (Ernie)
- The Water Horse: Legend of the Deep (Lewis Mowbray (Ben Chaplin))
- The Wild (Samson)
- Thomas and the Magic Railroad (Diesel 10)
- Thunderbirds (The Hood (Ben Kingsley))
- Tinker Bell and the Lost Treasure (Owl)
- Titan A.E (Additional Voices)
- TMNT (Thief Leader)
- Tom and Jerry film Series
  - Tom and Jerry: The Magic Ring (Freddie, Butch (2nd Voice), Diamond Cutter)
  - Tom and Jerry: Blast Off to Mars (Commander Bristle, Martian Scientist)
  - Tom and Jerry: The Fast and the Furry (Frank, Guard)
  - Tom and Jerry: A Nutcracker Tale (Butch (First Lines), Additional Voices)
- Tony Hawk in Boom Boom Sabotage (Frank)
- Top Cat: The Movie (Griswald)
- Totally Spies! The Movie (Yuri, Pappy)
- Toy Story 3 (Sarge, Chunk)
- Treasure Planet (Billy Bones)
- Up (Nurse AJ)
- Valiant (Jacques, Additional Voices)
- WALL-E (Additional Voices)
- Winx Club films (Mike)
  - Winx Club: The Secret of the Lost Kingdom
  - Winx Club 3D: Magical Adventure
- Wreck-It Ralph (M. Bison, General Hologram)
- Yogi Bear (Narrator)
- Yona Yona Penguin (Buka-Boo)
- Zambezia (Budzo)
- Zookeeper (Joe The Lion)

==== Games ====
- Tiny Toon Adventures: Buster and the Beanstalk (Additional Voices)
- Counter Strike: Global Offensive (IDF Radio Voice)

=== Acting ===
==== TV shows ====
- Ha'Emet Ha'Eroma (Huchberg)
- Ha'Nephilim (Malkishua)
- Ha'Cholmim (Professor Bloom)
- HaPijamot (Shlomi)
- Inyan Shel Zman (Miron the Soundman)
- Mendelbaum Balash Prati (Zorkin Trio)
- Michaela (Sasson)
- Sabrin Maranan (Policeman)
- Shemesh (Gil)
- Ulai Ha'Paam (Married Man)
