= Longarm =

Longarm may refer to:

- Longarm (book series), a Western book series
  - Longarm (film), a 1988 Western television film loosely based on the book series
- Longarm quilting, a sewing machine process
- Long gun, a category of firearm
- Long-arm jurisdiction, a legal term
- Long Arm (G.I. Joe), a G.I. Joe character
- P.J. "LongArm" O'Malley, a character from COPS (animated TV series)
- The Long ARM of Gil Hamilton, a science fiction short story collection by Larry Niven featuring Gil Hamilton
- Nelly Longarms, a character in English folklore
