= Out =

Out or OUT may refer to:

== Arts, entertainment, and media ==
=== Films ===
- Out (1957 film), a documentary short about the Hungarian Revolution of 1956
- Out (1982 film), an American film directed by Eli Hollander
- Out (2002 film), a Japanese film based on the novel by Natsuo Kirino and directed by Hideyuki Hirayama
- Out (2013 film), a Canadian short comedy film directed by Jeremy LaLonde
- Out (2017 film), a Slovak film directed by György Kristóf
- Out (2020 film), an American animated film produced by Pixar

=== Music ===
- Out (jazz) or outside, an approach to jazz improvisation
- OUT, a band produced by Adam Walton
- OUT, a 1994 album by Nav Katze
- Out (In Essence), a 1991 album by Fluke
- Out, a 2015 album by Kolors
- "Out", a song by Swans from The Great Annihilator

=== Television ===
- Out (TV series), a 1978 British television crime drama starring Tom Bell
- "Out" (Sons of Anarchy), a television episode
- "Out" (Dark Angel), a television episode

=== Other uses in arts, entertainment, and media ===
- Out (magazine), an LGBT fashion, entertainment, and lifestyle magazine
- Out (novel), a 1997 novel by Natsuo Kirino
- Out (manga), a Japanese manga series
- OUTeverywhere, a community website for LGBT people around the world

== Sports and recreation ==
- Out (baseball), a play which retires the batter or a base runner
- Out (cricket), the loss of a wicket by a batsman; also known as "dismissal"
- Out (poker), an unseen card which is expected to win a hand, if drawn
- Out (route), a pattern run by a receiver in American football

== Sexuality ==
- Coming out, publicly revealing one's own LGBT status
- Outing, publicly revealing someone else's LGBT status

== Mathematics ==
- Out(F_{n}), the outer automorphism group of a free group on n generators
- Outer automorphism group, a quotient Out(G) of the automorphism group

== Transport ==
- Outwood railway station, West Yorkshire, National Rail station code
- Oxford-University Transit, bus transport service in Oxford, Mississippi

== Other uses ==
- Out, a procedure word in voice radio communication

== See also ==
- Outing (disambiguation)
- Outside (disambiguation)
- Otu (disambiguation)
