= Outing (disambiguation) =

Outing, as a verb, is the act of publicly disclosing activities or relationships without the consent of the persons involved. This may include doxing.

Outing, as a noun, is a trip or foray, usually into a new or unknown area, often for recreational or educational purposes.

== Arts, entertainment, and media ==
=== Books ===
- Outing (magazine), an 1882 to 1923 American sports magazine
- "The Outing" (short story), a 1965 short story by James Baldwin

=== Film ===
- A School Outing, a 1983 Italian drama film
- The Outing (film), a 1987 horror film
- The Outing, an alternative title for Scream (1981 film)

=== Television ===
- The Outing, a 1993 episode of Seinfeld
- "Outing" (Watching), a 1987 episode

== Geography ==
- Outing, Minnesota

== See also ==
- Out (disambiguation)
- Down and Outing, a 1961 Tom and Jerry cartoon
- "The Jolly Boys' Outing", a 1989 Christmas special of the BBC sit-com Only Fools and Horses
