= Outdoor =

Outdoor(s) may refer to:

- Wilderness
- Natural environment
- Outdoor cooking
- Outdoor education
- Outdoor equipment
- Outdoor fitness
- Outdoor literature
- Outdoor recreation
- Outdoor Channel, an American pay television channel focused on the outdoors
- Outdoor Sports
- Outdoor Products

== See also ==
- Out of Doors (Bartók)
- Field (disambiguation)
- Outside (disambiguation)
- The Great Outdoors (disambiguation)
