= Ha'Nephilim =

Israeli television series

- Intertitle.
- Also known as: The Giants
- הנפילים
- Genre: Drama, Science fiction.
- Created by: Ruby Doanias; Chen Kliman
- Developed by: Teddy Productions .Inc
- Presented by: Yes
- Starring: Alon Levy; Hila Eran; Lital Rosenzweig; Daniel Maroz; Jason Danino Holt; Yaniv Polishak; Dan Shapira; Sammy Khoury
- Country of origin: Israel
- Original language: Hebrew
- No. of seasons: 2
- No. of episodes: 55

Production
- Production location: The Israeli Negev
- Running time: 25-30 minutes.

Original release
- Network: Yes; Arutz HaYeladim
- Release: June 17, 2007 – January 10, 2008

The show's characters.

Ha'Nephilim (The Outsiders, Hebrew: הנפילים) is a television programme that was broadcast on Yes (Israel) written by Ruby Doanias and Chen Kliman. It is named after the biblical Nephilim, who are referred to in the show. The second season was broadcast on the Israeli Kids Channel.

== Promotion ==
Before the show was premiered on Yes Israeli, it was advertised online using teasers, that requested the public's help in finding a missing teenager, Zuri Barlev. Visitors who clicked the banner, arrived to a website stating Zuri is missing, and that assistance of the public is requested. In addition, a blog and a website were opened by an account with the same name, to add more features to the promotion. The comments about the promotion were mostly negative, stating this way of promotion is highly unwanted due to its danger of confusing the public.

== Plot ==
The story tells about Zuri Barlev, who moves with his father, who was fired from the ministry of education, to a city in the southern part of Israel called the NRV (Nuclear Research Village), where technology is much more sophisticated than everyday technology. NRV residents have different colored tags, going from blue to green and red - the highest level, only given to administrators and researchers. The village was started during Moshe Dayan's years, when Dayan and Noah's father found a portal in the Negev, and began researching it. Before Noah's father died, he gave a special "key" to his son, and told him to hold onto it, because it is the world's only surviving artifact from the Earth's first years.

Zuri afterwards discovers that some NRV residents had a relative, who died two months before they moved in. Afterwards, he and his friends discover it was Noah who killed these people, in order to bring them to the NRV. Some time later, Zuri arrives to the "-5" floor, where he finds the portal, enters it, and discovers the spaceship (Gachnect Americofabish). The spaceship contains a dangerous combination of various gases, which cause people to go insane and lose control of their actions, but it somehow has no effect on Zuri. Later on, he discovers that the alien owners of that spaceship, used to throw their criminals onto our "jail" planet using the portal. However, the special alignment and ingredients of the atmosphere, caused the criminals to obtain "super-powers". Therefore, the locals called them "Ha'Nephilim" – "The Outsiders".

Several days later, Zuri discovers he is one of them, when the computer's hologram, a female "human" (Yamit Sol (linked to Hebrew article)), shows him a video recording of the past spaceship commander. Some time later, he enters the spaceship with Noah, which disables the force field, set by the previous commander, to stop other "unique people" from using their abilities. Noah succeeds, and suddenly a lot of people discover their abilities, ranging from freezing, controlling people and putting them to sleep through dreams, to super-speed, super-strength, super-stretch (whose effect is rendered horribly), duplicating, starting fires by mere thought, and more. Due to this, a person named Assaf, which discovered his abilities as super-strength and shield creation, teams up with Noah to find the other outsiders and take control of the spaceship, as it can control the entire planet it's facing.

== Character histories ==
- Zuria (Zuri) Barlev (Alon Levy) -- A teenager in the 12th grade whose mother was killed 2 months before he moved into the NRV with his father. A descendant of "The Outsiders", who are aliens. After the force field around our planet was removed, Zuri discovered his telekinesis and super-speed abilities.
- Adi Katz (Lital Rosenzweig) -- Born in the NRV, and a friend and neighbor of Zuri. An adventuress and a sometimes nagging teenager. Shlomi's sister, and Shouki's child.
- Lia Bentov (Hila Eran) -- A beautiful grade A student. She moved to the NRV by age 10, after her father died.
- Maor Elmakayes (Jason Danino Holt) -- Born in the NRV, likes to break rules and gets in trouble nearly every day. His nickname is "Gever Gever" ("A Real Man").
- Yuval Atzmon (Daniel Maroz) -- A computers and technology geek, moved to the NRV by age 13, and has a crush on Adi. A pretty strange kid, who laughs in all the wrong moments.
- Shlomi Katz (Dan Shapira) -- Adi's brother and the NRV's head of security.
- Noah Litani (Dvir Benedek) -- The NRV's vice manager, arrived to the NRV during his childhood. The son of Yefet Litani, who was Moshe Dayan's research assistant.
- Assaf Hen (Yaniv Polishuk) -- Vice head of security in the NRV, a good friend of Shlomi, and addicted to a tuna & avocado sandwich. After the force field around our planet was removed, Assaf discovered his abilities, which are super-strength and the ability to create a force field.
- Avi Barlev (Sammy Khoury) -- Zuri's father, a history teacher who lost his job, and received a job at the NRV.
- Shouki Katz (Gilles Ben-David) -- An old scientist in the NRV, and Shlomi and Adi's father. Tried to receive the job of vice managing the NRV instead of Noah. 1 year later, when Noah was arrested for several murders, Shouki was assigned as the NRV's vice manager.
- The Computer's Hologram (Yamit Sol) -- A holographic appearance of the spaceship's computer.

=== Guest characters ===
- Karen (Yael Goldman) — A journalist from Tel-Aviv who arrives to the NRV to write an article about it. After the Force field around our planet was removed, Karen discovered her ability to control people through their dreams, and forcing them into sleep, possibly eternal sleep.
- Shaoul the Torcher (Yaron Levi Savag) — A person with the ability to start fire and burn objects and people by simply thinking about it. He joins Noah and Assaf afterwards to take control of the spaceship.
- Shmoueli (Lior Calfon) — A person with the ability to turn invisible. Used his ability to cause unbelievable sports games results, pay his debts.
- Yoel & Moshe Cahana ("The Magicians") (Erez Shafrir) — Two people who look alike, and can read thoughts. They communicate by reading each other's thoughts, which enables them to communicate hundreds of miles away. They fail when trying to take control of the spaceship, when Zuri and his friends place one of them inside a virtual reality scanner, and simulate the takeover process, which allowed them to fool them both, thus trapping and defeating them.
- Amit Bachar (Tom Schwarzer) — Has the ability of freezing anything. He joins the "good guys", but later on turns out to be a "bad guy".
- 'Benny' ^{(Real name not written in original article)} — Has the ability of super-stretching, causing him to be invulnerable to any attack. He tries to take over the spaceship, but fails when Amit and Zuri freeze him, and then "crush him", which, technically kills him.
- 'Abigail' (Sharon Haziz) — Has the ability to communicate with machines, and use them as bombs and weapons. She can also plant electrical devices in any human's body, including machines who are believed to be too big to plant in a human's arm. She also has the ability to "restart a day" by bending time and space.
- 'Y'Israel' (Aviad Bentov) — Has the ability to "age" people, and use their own biological clock time for himself, thus making him young forever.
- 'Rami The Shape Shifter' — Has the ability to morph to any person, once he obtains his DNA by touching him. Can also use an Outsider's power if using his DNA. Joins Noah and Assaf.
- Menashe Vice (Haim Znati) — A serial killer released from jail by using his ability. Has the ability of persuasion using a sub-consciouses voice, making people do whatever he wants them to do. Killed by Shlomi.
- Anat The Waitress (Efrat Cohen) — Has the ability to see the future. Uses that ability to steal jewellery, money, and other valuable items.
- Moshiko Ozeri (Nir Shaibi) — Has the ability to change his state of matter to energy, allowing him to use electricity as a way of transportation.
- Smadar Ozeri-Shpigelman (Galit Giat) — After hearing about her brother, Ozeri, and his escape, she tries to find out more about the NRV.
- "Boiler The Rabi" — A Rabi saying he can boil water to a full boiled temperature, A deadly force which can destroy a person's life, as the human body is filled with about 70% of water. Later on it is discovered it is a trick, used with an electric boiler under the table.
- "Swords Guy" (Ido Tadmor) — A person with the power to generate swords from his hands. Joins Noah and Assaf to command the spaceship, yet fails.
