= The Outside =

The Outside may refer to:

- "The Outside" (song), by Twenty One Pilots, 2021
- "The Outside" a 2023 single by Boys Like Girls from the album Sunday at Foxwoods
- "The Outside", a song by Taylor Swift from the album Taylor Swift, 2006
- The Outside, a 2009 film starring Michael Graziadei
- "The Outside" (The Amazing World of Gumball), a television episode
- The Outside, an episode of the television series Guillermo del Toro's Cabinet of Curiosities
- The Outside (play), a 1917 play by Susan Glaspell.

== See also ==
- Outside (disambiguation)
- The Outsider (disambiguation)
