= Long Arm of the Law =

Long Arm of the Law may refer to:

- "The Long Arm of the Law", a song by Kenny Rogers
- Long Arm of the Law (film), a 1984 Hong Kong film directed by Johnny Mak
