= Dan Shapira =

American physicist

Dan Shapira (November 13, 1943 – December 24, 2024) was an American physicist from the Oak Ridge National Laboratory. He was awarded the status of Fellow in the American Physical Society, after he was nominated by the Division of Nuclear Physics in 2009, for contributions to the study of nuclear collisions: the discovery of nuclear orbiting, pioneering measurements of the space-time extent of particle-emitting sources, and seminal studies of fusion with n-rich exotic beams, and for development of innovative instrumentation to enable these studies.

== See also ==
- List of fellows of the American Physical Society (1998–2010)
