= Lou Cameron =

American writer (1924–2010)

- Born: June 20, 1924; San Francisco, California, U.S.
- Died: November 25, 2010 (aged 86)
- Occupations: Writer; comic book artist

Lou Cameron (June 20, 1924 – November 25, 2010) was an American writer and a comic book artist.

== Early life ==
He was born in San Francisco in 1924 to Lou Cameron Sr. and Ruth Marvin Cameron, a vaudeville comedian and his vocalist wife. Cameron served in Europe during World War II in the U.S. Army's 2nd Armored Division ("Hell On Wheels").

== Comics ==
Before becoming a writer, Cameron illustrated comics such as Classics Illustrated and miscellaneous western, horror, mystery and romance comics. One of his first written stories, "The Last G.I.," is a science fiction story about American soldiers struggling to survive in a nuclear battlefield. It appeared in Real War (volume 2 number 2, October 1958).

== Literary works ==
The film-to-book adaptations he wrote include None but the Brave (based on the anti-war film directed by and starring Frank Sinatra), California Split (based on the Joseph Walsh screenplay for the Robert Altman film starring Elliott Gould and George Segal), Sky Riders (based on the adventure film starring James Coburn, Robert Culp and Susannah York), Hannibal Brooks (based on the screenplay written by the team of Dick Clement & Ian La Frenais for the Michael Winner film starring Oliver Reed and Michael J. Pollard), and an epic volume based on a number of scripts for the award-winning CBS miniseries How the West Was Won that starred James Arness (not to be confused with the novelization by Louis L'Amour of the identically titled feature film, although the TV series was loosely based on that film).

On top of these labeled novelizations, Cameron wrote what's known as an inferred novelization, which doesn't declare itself directly as such, but can be divined from indicia. The WWII adventure novel, Morituri by German author W. J. Lueddecke, a bestseller in Europe, had not been published in English before work began on the film. The translation, by H.R. Noerdlinger, had been commissioned by 20th Century Fox for in-studio use only. It was probably deemed unfit for commercial publication on its own terms. Thus, the movie tie-in paperback novel that hit the book racks in 1965, copyright to the publisher, Fawcett, contains, on its title page, the by-lines of author and translator, and under that, "Edited for Gold Medal Books by Lou Cameron." This page is opposite a page of movie credits, including "Screenplay by Daniel Taradash." Cameron's credit is thus "code" for his actual assignment — which was to create a new, hybrid novel drawn from both the translation of the original and the Taradash screenplay, both of which materials would have been provided by the movie studio.

He also wrote two novels based on TV series: an original, The Outsider, based on the Private Eye series created by Roy Huggins and starring Darren McGavin; and "A Praying Mantis Kills", one of the novelizations of the Kung Fu television series, under the "house name" (shared pseudonym provided by the publisher) "Howard Lee". (The three other books in that series were written, also as Howard Lee, by Barry N. Malzberg and Ron Goulart.)

Alone among Cameron's tie-ins,The Outsider is written in the first person, from the POV of its main character, P.I. David Ross. Though that perspective is naturally derived from the main character's voice-over commentary in the episodes, Cameron often employed first person narrative in his original novels, particularly the earlier (1960–1970) standalone works, such as The Empty Quarter, Angel's Flight, The Good Guy, and The Amphorae Pirates.

Cameron also created the character Longarm — whose adventures, starting in the late 1970s, pretty much defined the then-new sex-and-sagebrush subgenre of the "adult" Western — under the house name "Tabor Evans" and wrote at least 52 of the more-than-400 books in the series. He wrote the Renegade series as "Ramsay Thorne", and the Stringer series under his own name. He also wrote at least one Easy Company novel as "John Wesley Howard", In 2004, his novel The Subway Stalker was adapted to film by French director Jean-Pierre Mocky as Le Furet.

He received awards for his Western writings, such as the Golden Spur for The Spirit Horses. He wrote in estimate over 300 books, including titles below compiled from copyright records at the Library of Congress.

== Bibliography ==
=== As Lou Cameron ===
- Angel's Flight (1960)
- The Empty Quarter (1962)
- The Sky Divers (1962)
- None But the Brave (1965) (novelization of the screenplay)
- Morituri (1965) (credited as "editor"; see above)
- The Block Busters (1966)
- Iron Men with Wooden Wings (1967)
- Bastard's Name Is War (1968)
- The Good Guy (1968)
- Green Fields of Hell (1968)
- Mistress of Bayou LaBelle (1968)
- Ashanti (1969)
- Big Red Ball (1969)
- The Black Camp (1969)
- The Dragon's Spine (1969)
- File on a Missing Redhead (1969)
- Hannibal Brooks (1969) (novelization of the screenplay)
- The Mud War (1969)
- The Outsider (1969) (original novel based on the television series)
- Dirty War of Sergeant Slade (1969)
- Amphora Pirates (1970)-Hard Cover Edition
- Before It's Too Late (1970)
- Behind the Scarlet Door (1971)
- Spurhead (1971)
- The Tipping Point (1971)
- Zulu Warrior (1971)
- Cybernia (1972)
- The Girl with the Dynamite Bangs (1973)
- California Split (1974) (novelization of the screenplay)
- Kung Fu #4: A Praying Mantis Kills (novelization of the episode teleplay)
- Barca (1975)
- North to Cheyenne (1975)
- Closing Circle (1975)
- Dekker (1976)
- Guns of Durango (1976)
- Sky Riders (1976) (novelization of the screenplay)
- Tancredi (1976)
- The Spirit Horses (1976)
- Drop into Hell (1976)
- How the West Was Won (1977)
- Code Seven (1977)
- The Big Lonely (1978)
- The Cascade Ghost (1978)
- The Subway Stalker (1980)
- The Hot Car (1981)
- Grass of Goodnight (1987)
- The Buntline Special (1988)
- Crooked Lance (1989)
- Yellow Iron (1990)
- Eagle Chief (1990)
- The First Blood (1992)

==== Stringer series ====
- Stringer (1987) #1
- On Dead Man's Range (1987) #2
- Stringer On the Assassin's Trail (1987) #3
- Stringer and the Hangman's Rodeo (1988) #4
- Stringer and the Wild Bunch (1988) #5
- Stringer and the Hanging Judge (1988) #6
- In Tombstone (1988) #7
- Stringer and the Deadly Flood (1988) #8
- Stringer and the Lost Tribe (1988) #9
- Stringer and the Oil Well Indians (1989) #10
- Stringer and the Border War (1989) #11
- Stringer On the Mojave (1989)
- Stringer On Pikes Peak (1989)
- Stringer and the Hell Bound Herd (1989)
- Stringer in a Texas Shoot-Out (1989)

=== As Justin Adams ===
- Chains (1977)

=== As Julie Cameron ===
- The Darklings (1975)
- Devil in the Pines (1975)

=== As Tabor Evans ===
Books in the Longarm series

- Longarm (1978)
- Longarm and the Wendigo (1978)
- Longarm and the Highgraders (1979)
- Longarm and the Molly Maguires (1979)
- Longarm in the Sand Hills (1979)
- Longarm and the Ghost Dancers (1980)
- Longarm and the Mounties (1980)
- Longarm in the Four Corners (1980)
- Longarm on the Old Mission Trail (1980)
- Longarm and the Laredo Loop (1981)
- Longarm and the Stalking Corpse (1981)
- Longarm on the Big Muddy (1981)
- Longarm and the Eastern Dudes (1982)
- Longarm in Deadwood (1982)
- Longarm on the Barbary Coast (1982)
- Longarm on the Great Divide (1983)
- Longarm and the Bone Skinners (1986)
- Longarm and the Lone Star Mission .(1987)
- Longarm in the Bighorn Basin (1987)
- Longarm on Death Mountain .(1987)
- Longarm on the Overland Trail .(1987)
- Longarm and the Hangman's Vengeance .(1988)
- Longarm and the Utah Killers .(1988)
- Longarm and the Blossom Rock Banshee (1998)
- Longarm and the Calgary Kid (1998)
- Longarm and the River Pirates (1998)
- Longarm and the Wicked Schoolmarm (1998)
- Longarm and the Wyoming Wildwomen (1998)
- Longarm and the Church Ladies (2000)
- Longarm and the Mad Bomber's Bride (2000)
- Longarm and the Nevada Belly Dancer (2000)
- Longarm and the Sins of Sister Simone (2000)
- Longarm and the Gunshot Gang (2001)
- Longarm and the Hangman's Daughter (2001)
- Longarm and the Lady Bandit (2001)
- Longarm and the Amorous Amazon (2002)
- Longarm and the Contrary Cowgirls (2002)
- Longarm and the Haunted Whorehouse (2002)
- Longarm and the Sidesaddle Assassin (2002)
- Longarm and the Bad Girls of Rio Blanco (2003)
- Longarm and the Dead Man's Tale (2003)
- Longarm and the Deadly Dead Man (2003)
- Longarm and the Lady Hustlers (2003)
- Longarm and Town-Taming Tess (2003)
- Longarm and the Bartered Brides (2004)
- Longarm and the Boys in the Back Room (2004)
- Longarm and the Great Milk-Train Robbery (2004)
- Longarm Sets the Stage (2004)
- Longarm and the Sidekick from Hell (2005)
- Longarm and the Unwelcome Woolies (2005)
- Longarm and the Ungrateful Gun (2006)

=== As John Wesley Howard ===
- Easy Company and the Suicide Boys (1981)

=== As Howard Lee (shared "house" pseudonym) ===
- Kung Fu #4: A Praying Mantis Kills (1974) (novelization of the episode teleplay)

=== As Mary Manning ===
- This Fever in My Blood (1980)

=== As Ramsay Thorne ===
- Renegade (1979)
- Blood Runner (1980)
- The Fear Merchant (1980)
- Death Hunter (1980)
- Macumba Killer (1980)
- Panama Gunner (1980)
- Death in High Places (1981)
- Over the Andes to Hell (1981)
- Hell Raider (1981)
- The Great Game (1981)
- Citadel of Death (1981)
- The Badlands Brigade (1982)
- The Mahogany Pirates (1982)
- Harvest of Death (1982)
- Terror Trail (1982)
- Mexican Marauder (1983)
- Slaughter in Sinaloa (1983)
- Cavern of Doom (1983)
- Hellfire in Honduras (1983)
- Shots at Sunrise (1983) #20
- River of Revenge (1983)
- Payoff in Panama (1984)
- Volcano of Violence (1984)
- Guatemala Gunman (1984)
- High Sea Showdown (1984)
- Blood on the Border (1984)
- Savage Safari (1984)
- The Slave Raiders (1985)
- Peril in Progreso (1985)
- Mayhem At Mission Bay (1985)
- Shootout in Segovia (1985)
- Death Over Darien (1985)
- Costa Rican Carnage (1985)
- Golden Express (1986)
- Standoff in the Sky (1986)
- Guns for Garcia (1986)
