= Outside =

Outside or Outsides may refer to:

- Wilderness

== Books and magazines ==
- Outside, a book by Marguerite Duras
- Outside (magazine), an outdoors magazine

== Film, theatre and TV ==
- Outside TV (formerly RSN Television), a television network
- Outside (2004 film), a short film by Jenn Kao
- Outside (2024 film), a Philippine film
- Fuori, a 2025 Italian film
- "Outside", an episode of One Day at a Time (2017 TV series)
- Outside, a 2026 spin-off series of Inside

== Music ==
- Outside (jazz), an element of musical composition/improvisation
- Outside Music, a Canadian music distributor and record label
- Outside Studios, a British recording studio, based in England

=== Albums ===
- Outside (Amar album), 2000
- Outside (David Bowie album), 1995
- Outside (Burna Boy album), 2018
- Outside (CFCF album), 2013
- Outside (Shelly Manne album), 1970
- Outside (O'Death album), 2011
- Outside (Tapes n' Tapes album), 2011
- Outsides (EP), by John Frusciante, 2013
- Outsides, an album by Arsenal, 2005

=== Songs ===
- "Outside" (Calvin Harris song), 2014
- "Outside" (Cardi B song), 2025
- "Outside" (Coi Leray song), 2026
- "Outside" (David Bowie song), 1995
- "Outside" (Foo Fighters song), 2014
- "Outside" (George Michael song), 1998
- "Outside" (Mariah Carey song), 1997
- "Outside" (OG Bobby Billions song), 2020
- "Outside" (Staind song), 2001
- "Outside", a song by 6lack from 6pc Hot EP
- "Outside", a song by Ari Lennox from Age/Sex/Location
- "Outside", a song by bill wurtz, 2017
- "Outside", a song by Childish Gambino from Camp
- "Outside", a song by Enhypen from Desire: Unleash
- "Outside", a song by Megan Thee Stallion from Good News
- "Outside", a song by Hollywood Undead from Notes from the Underground
- "Outside", a song by The Weeknd from Echoes of Silence
- "Outside", a song by Tribe from Here at the Home
- "Outside", a song by Travis Scott from Birds in the Trap Sing McKnight
- "Outside", a song by Injury Reserve from By the Time I Get to Phoenix
- "Outside", a song by Yeat featuring Young Thug from 2 Alive

== Other uses ==
- Outside (Alaska), any non-Alaska location, as referred to by Alaskans
- Outside (company), formerly Pocket Outdoor Media, a company that publishes the Outside magazine and operates Outside TV, among other ventures

== See also ==
- The Outside (disambiguation)
- Inside (disambiguation)
- External (disambiguation)
- Out (disambiguation)
- Outdoor (disambiguation)
