= Longarm (novel series) =

Adult western book series

The Longarm novels were a series of western novels featuring the character of Custis Long, who is nicknamed Longarm, a U.S. Deputy Marshal based in Denver, Colorado in the 1880s. The nickname plays on his surname and role as the "long arm of the law".

The series was written by "Tabor Evans", a house pseudonym used by a number of authors at Jove Books. Lou Cameron helped create the character and wrote a number of the early books in the series. The first book was published in 1978 and new ones were added at a rate of approximately one a month through 2015. In addition to the regular series, there was a series of "giant editions" which were longer novels.

The Longarm series was a mainstay of the "adult western" genre which arose in the 1970s. These books are distinguished from classical westerns by the inclusion of more explicit sex and violence. In addition to Cameron, other authors known to have written books in the series include Melvin Marshall, Will C. Knott, Frank Roderus, Chet Cunningham, J. Lee Butts, Gary McCarthy, James Reasoner, Jeffrey M. Wallmann, Peter Brandvold and Harry Whittington.

== List of Longarm novels ==
1. Longarm (1978)—Lou Cameron
2. Longarm on the Border (1978)—Melvin Marshall
3. Longarm and the Avenging Angels (1978)—William C. Knott
4. Longarm and the Wendigo (1979)—Lou Cameron
5. Longarm in the Indian Nation (1979)
6. Longarm and the Loggers (1979)—William C. Knott
7. Longarm and the High Graders (1979)—Lou Cameron
8. Longarm and the Nesters (1979)
9. Longarm and the Hatchet Men (1979)—William C. Knott
10. Longarm and the Molly Maguires (1979)—Lou Cameron
11. Longarm and the Texas Rangers (1979)
12. Longarm in Lincoln County (1979)—William C. Knott
13. Longarm in the Sand Hills (1979)—Lou Cameron
14. Longarm in Leadville (1979)
15. Longarm On the Devil's Trail (1979)
16. Longarm and the Mounties (1979)—Lou Cameron
17. Longarm and the Bandit Queen (1980)
18. Longarm On the Yellowstone (1980)
19. Longarm in the Four Corners (1980)—Lou Cameron
20. Longarm at Robber's Roost (1980)
21. Longarm and the Sheepherders (1980)
22. Longarm and the Ghost Dancers (1980)—Lou Cameron
23. Longarm and the Town Tamer (1980)
24. Longarm and the Railroaders (1980)
25. Longarm On the Old Mission Trail (1980)—Lou Cameron
26. Longarm and the Dragon Hunters (1980)—William C. Knott
27. Longarm and the Rurales (1980)
28. Longarm On the Humboldt (1981)—Harry Whittington
29. Longarm On the Big Muddy (1981)—Lou Cameron
30. Longarm South of the Gila (1981)
31. Longarm in Northfield (1981)
32. Longarm and the Golden Lady (1981)—Harry Whittington
33. Longarm and the Laredo Loop (1981)—Lou Cameron
34. Longarm and the Boot Hillers (1981)
35. Longarm and the Blue Norther (1981)—Harry Whittington
36. Longarm on the Santa Fe (1981)
37. Longarm and the Stalking Corpse (1981)—Lou Cameron
38. Longarm and the Comancheros (1981)—William C. Knott
39. Longarm and the Devil's Railroad (1981)—Melvin Marshall
40. Longarm in Silver City (1982)—Harry Whittington
41. Longarm on the Barbary Coast (1982)—Lou Cameron
42. Longarm and the Moonshiners (1982)
43. Longarm in Yuma (1982)
44. Longarm in Boulder Canyon (1982)—Harry Whittington
45. Longarm in Deadwood (1982)—Lou Cameron
46. Longarm and the Great Train Robbery (1982)
47. Longarm in the Badlands (1982)
48. Longarm in the Big Thicket (1982)—Harry Whittington
49. Longarm and the Eastern Dudes (1982)—Lou Cameron
50. Longarm in the Big Bend (1982)
51. Longarm and the Snake Dancers (1983)
52. Longarm On the Great Divide (1983)—Lou Cameron
53. Longarm and the Buckskin Rogue (1983)—Frank Roderus
54. Longarm and the Calico Kid (1983)
55. Longarm and the French Actress (1983)
56. Longarm and the Outlaw Lawman (1983)
57. Longarm and the Bounty Hunters (1983)
58. Longarm in No Man's Land (1983)
59. Longarm and the Big Outfit (1983)
60. Longarm and Santa Anna's Gold (1983)
61. Longarm and the Custer County War (1983)
62. Longarm in Virginia City (1984)
63. Longarm and the James County War (1984)
64. Longarm and the Cattle Baron (1984)
65. Longarm and the Steer Swindlers (1984)
66. Longarm and the Hangman's Noose (1984)
67. Longarm and the Omaha Tinhorns (1984)
68. Longarm and the Desert Duchess (1984)
69. Longarm On the Painted Desert (1984)
70. Longarm On the Ogallala Trail (1984)
71. Longarm On the Arkansas Divide (1984)
72. Longarm and the Blind Man's Vengeance (1984)
73. Longarm at Fort Reno (1984)
74. Longarm and the Durango Payroll (1985)
75. Longarm: West of the Pecos (1985)
76. Longarm on the Nevada Line (1985)
77. Longarm and the Blackfoot Guns (1985)
78. Longarm on the Santa Cruz (1985)
79. Longarm and the Cowboy's Revenge (1985)
80. Longarm On the Goodnight Trail (1985)—Melvin Marshall
81. Longarm and the Frontier Duchess (1985)
82. Longarm in the Bitterroots (1985)
83. Longarm and the Tenderfoot (1985)
84. Longarm and the Stagecoach Bandits (1985)
85. Longarm and the Big Shoot Out (1986)
86. Longarm in the Hard Rock Country (1986)
87. Longarm in the Texas Panhandle (1986)
88. Longarm and the Rancher's Showdown (1986)
89. Longarm and the Inland Passage (1986)
90. Longarm in the Ruby Range Country (1986)
91. Longarm and the Great Cattle Kill (1986)
92. Longarm and the Crooked Railman (1986)
93. Longarm On the Siwash Trail (1986)
94. Longarm and the Runaway Thieves (1986)
95. Longarm and the Escape Artist (1986)
96. Longarm and the Bone Skinners (1986)—Lou Cameron
97. Longarm and the Mexican Line-Up (1987)
98. Longarm and the Trail Drive Sham (1987)
99. Longarm and the Desert Spirits (1987)
100. Longarm On Death Mountain (1987)—Lou Cameron
101. Longarm and the Cottonwood Curse (1987)
102. Longarm and the Desperate Manhunt (1987)
103. Longarm and the Rocky Mountain Chase (1987)
104. On the Overland Trail (1987)—Lou Cameron
105. Longarm and the Big Posse (1987)
106. Longarm on Dead Man's Trail (1987)
107. Longarm in the Bighorn Basin (1987)—Lou Cameron
108. Longarm and the Blood Harvest (1987)
109. Longarm and the Bloody Trackdown (1988)
110. Longarm and the Hangman's Vengeance (1988)—Lou Cameron
111. Longarm on the Thunderbird Run (1988)
112. Longarm and the Utah Killers (1988)—Lou Cameron
113. Longarm in the Big Burnout (1988)
114. Longarm and the Quiet Guns (1988)
115. Longarm in the Valley of Death (1988)
116. Longarm and the Blood Bounty (1988)
117. Longarm and the Treacherous Trial (1988)
118. Longarm and the New Mexico Shoot Out (1988)
119. Longarm and the Renegade Sergeant (1988)
120. Longarm in the Sierra Madres (1988)
121. Longarm and the Medicine Wolf (1989)
122. Longarm and the Indian Raiders (1989)
123. Longarm in a Desert Showdown (1989)
124. Longarm and the Mad Dog Killer (1989)
125. Longarm and the Hangman's Noose (1989)
126. Longarm and the Doomed Witness (1989)
127. Longarm and the Outlaw Sheriff (1989)
128. Longarm and the Day of the Death (1989)
129. Longarm and the Rebel Killers (1989)
130. Longarm and the Hangman's List (1989)
131. Longarm in the Clearwaters (1989)
132. Longarm and the Redwood Raiders (1989)
133. Longarm and the Deadly Jailbreak (1989)
134. Longarm and the Pawnee Kid (1990)
135. Longarm and the Devil's Stagecoach (1990)
136. Longarm and the Wyoming Bloodbath (1990)
137. Longarm in the Red Desert (1990)
138. Longarm and the Crooked Marshal (1990)
139. Longarm and the Texas Rangers (1990)
140. Longarm and the Vigilantes (1990)
141. Longarm in the Osage Strip (1990)
142. Longarm and the Lost Mine (1990)
143. Longarm and the Longley Legend (1990)
144. Longarm and the Dead Man's Badge (1990)
145. Longarm and the Killer's Shadow (1991)
146. Longarm and the Montana Massacre (1991)
147. Longarm in the Mexican Badlands (1991)
148. Longarm and the Bounty Huntress (1991)
149. Longarm and the Denver Bustout (1991)
150. Longarm and the Skull Canyon Gang (1991)
151. Longarm and the Railroad to Hell (1991)
152. Longarm and the River of Death (1991)
153. Longarm and the Gold Hunters (1991)
154. Longarm and the Colorado Gundown (1991)
155. Longarm and the Grave Robbers (1991)
156. Longarm and the Arkansas Ambush (1991)
157. Longarm and the Arizona Showdown (1992)
158. Longarm and the Ute Nation (1992)
159. Longarm in the Sierra Oriental (1992)
160. Longarm and the Gunslicks (1992)
161. Longarm and the Lady Sheriff (1992)
162. Longarm On the Devil's Highway (1992)
163. Longarm and the Cimarron City Sellout (1992)
164. Longarm and the Cheyenne Kid (1992)
165. Longarm and the Rebel Brand (1992)
166. Longarm and the Double Eagles (1992)
167. Longarm and the Fool Killer (1992)
168. Longarm and the Shoshoni Silver (1992)
169. Longarm and the Night Branders (1993)
170. Longarm and the Taos Terror (1993)
171. Longarm and the Nevada Swindle (1993)
172. Longarm on the Butterfield Spur (1993)
173. Longarm and the Diamond Snatchers (1993)—Chet Cunningham
174. Longarm and the Border Showdown (1993)
175. Longarm and the Carnival Killer (1993)
176. Longarm and the Captive Women (1993)
177. Longarm in the Cross Fire (1993)
178. Longarm and the Golden Death (1993)—James Reasoner
179. Longarm and the Rebels Revenge (1993)
180. Longarm and the Dead Ringers (1993)
181. Longarm and the Bounty of Blood (1994)
182. Longarm and the Train Robbers (1994)
183. Longarm on the Fever Coast (1994)
184. Longarm and the Last Man (1994)
185. Longarm and the Drifting Badge (1994)—James Reasoner
186. Longarm and the High Rollers (1994)
187. Longarm and the Bounty Hunters (1994)
188. Longarm and the Gallagher Gang (1994)
189. Longarm and the Apache Plunder (1994)
190. Longarm and the Barbed Wire Bullies (1994)
191. Longarm and the Texas Hijackers (1994)
192. Longarm and the Man-Eaters (1994)—James Reasoner
193. Longarm and the San Angelo Showdown (1995)
194. Longarm and the Jerkwater Bustout (1995)
195. Longarm and the Yuma Prison Girls (1995)
196. Longarm and the Helldorado Kid (1995)
197. Longarm and the Silver Mine Marauders (1995)
198. Longarm and the Deadly Thaw (1995)
199. Longarm and the John Bull Feud (1995)
200. Longarm and the Kansas Killer (1995)
201. Longarm and Big Trouble in Brodie (1995)
202. Longarm and the Shivaree Riders (1995)
203. Longarm and the Saddle Rock Spook (1995)
204. Longarm and the Arizona Ambush (1995)
205. Longarm and the Daughters of Death (1996)
206. Longarm and the Desert Damsel (1996)
207. Longarm and the Brazos Devil (1996)—James Reasoner
208. Longarm and the Angel of Inferno (1996)—James Reasoner
209. Longarm and the Grand Slam Heist (1996)
210. Longarm and the Deadly Prisoner (1996)
211. Longarm and the Big Fifty (1996)
212. Longarm and the Counterfeit Corpse (1996)
213. Longarm and the Minute Men (1996)
214. Longarm and the Racy Ladies (1996)—James Reasoner
215. Longarm and the Hostage Woman (1996)
216. Longarm and the Secret Assassin (1997)
217. Longarm and the Whisky Woman (1997)
218. Longarm and the Boarding House Widow (1997)
219. Longarm and the Crying Corpse (1997)
220. Longarm and the Indian War (1997)
221. Longarm and the Dead Man's Reward (1997)
222. Longarm and the Backwoods Baroness (1997)—James Reasoner
223. Longarm and the Double-Barrel Blowout (1997)
224. Longarm and the Maiden Medusa (1997)
225. Longarm and the Dead Man's Play (1997)
226. Longarm and the Lady Faire (1997)
227. Longarm and the Rebel Executioner (1997)
228. Longarm and the Voodoo Queen (1997)—James Reasoner
229. Longarm and the Border Wildcat (1998)—James Reasoner
230. Longarm and the Wyoming Wildwomen (1998)—Lou Cameron
231. Longarm and the Durango Double-Cross (1998)
232. Longarm and the Whiskey Creek Widow (1998)
233. Longarm and the Branded Beauty (1998)
234. Longarm and the Renegade Assassins (1998)
235. Longarm and the Wicked Schoolmarm (1998)—Lou Cameron
236. Longarm and the River Pirates (1998)—Lou Cameron
237. Longarm and the Hatchet Woman (1998)
238. Longarm and the Blossom Rock Banshee (1998)—Lou Cameron
239. Longarm and the Grave Robbers (1998)
240. Longarm and the Nevada Nymphs (1998)
241. Longarm and the Colorado Counterfeiter (1999)
242. Longarm and the Red-Light Ladies (1999)—James Reasoner
243. Longarm and the Kansas Jailbird (1999)
244. Longarm and the Devils Sister (1999)
245. Longarm and the Vanishing Virgin (1999)—James Reasoner
246. Longarm and the Cursed Corpse (1999)
247. Longarm and the Lady from Tombstone (1999)
248. Longarm and the Wronged Woman (1999)
249. Longarm and the Sheep War (1999)
250. Longarm and the Chain Gang Women (1999)—James Reasoner
251. Longarm and the Diary of Madame Velvet (1999)
252. Longarm and the Four Corners Gang (1999)
253. Longarm in the Valley of Sin (1999)—James Reasoner
254. Longarm and the Redhead's Ransom (2000)
255. Longarm and the Mustang Maiden (2000)
256. Longarm and the Dynamite Damsel (2000)—James Reasoner
257. Longarm and the Nevada Belly Dancer (2000)—Lou Cameron
258. Longarm and the Pistolero Princess (2000)—James Reasoner
259. Longarm and the Black Widow (2000)
260. Longarm and the Church Ladies (2000)—Lou Cameron
261. Longarm and the Golden Goddess (2000)—James Reasoner
262. Longarm and the Sins of Sister Simone (2000)—Lou Cameron
263. Longarm on a Bloody Vendetta (2000)
264. Longarm and the Love Sisters (2000)
265. Longarm and the Mad Bomber's Bride (2000)—Lou Cameron
266. Longarm and the Wayward Widow (2001)—James Reasoner
267. Longarm and the Mountain Bandit (2001)
268. Longarm and the Nevada Slasher (2001)
269. Longarm and the Horse Thief (2001)
270. Longarm and the Lady Bandit (2001)—Lou Cameron
271. Longarm and the Scorpion Murders (2001)
272. Longarm and the Six-Gun Senorita (2001)—James Reasoner
273. Longarm and the Texas Tiger Lady (2001)
274. Longarm and the Gunshot Gang (2001)—Lou Cameron
275. Longarm and the Denver Executioners (2001)
276. Longarm and the Widow's Spite (2001)
277. Longarm and the Yukon Queen (2001)—James Reasoner
278. Longarm and the Sidesaddle Assassin (2001)—Lou Cameron
279. Longarm on a Witch-Hunt (2002)—James Reasoner
280. Longarm On the Border (2002)
281. Longarm and the Lady Lawyer (2002)—James Reasoner
282. Longarm and Big Lips Lilly (2002)
283. Longarm and the Ozark Angel (2002)—James Reasoner
284. Longarm and the Haunted Whorehouse (2002)—Lou Cameron
285. Longarm and the Mysterious Mistress (2002)
286. Longarm and the Druid Sisters (2002)
287. Longarm and the Blackmailers (2002)—James Reasoner
288. Longarm and the Amorous Amazon (2002)—Lou Cameron
289. Longarm in Paradise (2002)
290. Longarm and the Desert Rose (2003)—James Reasoner
291. Longarm and the Rancher's Daughter (2003)
292. Longarm and the Lady Hustlers (2003)—Lou Cameron
293. Longarm and the Poisoners (2003)
294. Longarm and the Arizona Flame (2003)—James Reasoner
295. Longarm and the Sinful Sisters (2003)
296. Longarm and the Bad Girls of Rio Blanco (2003)—Lou Cameron
297. Longarm and Town-Taming Tess (2003)—Lou Cameron
298. Longarm and the Kissin' Cousins (2003)
299. Longarm and Maximilian's Gold (2003)
300. Longarm and the Dead Man's Tale (2003)—Lou Cameron
301. Longarm and the Bank Robber's Daughter (2003)—James Reasoner
302. Longarm and the Golden Ghost (2003)—James Reasoner
303. Longarm and the Grand Canyon Gang (2004)
304. Longarm and the Great Milk Train Robbery (2004)—Lou Cameron
305. Longarm and the Talking Spirit (2004)
306. Longarm and the Pirate's Gold (2004)—James Reasoner
307. Longarm and the Outlaw's Shadow (2004)
308. Longarm and the Montana Madmen (2004)
309. Longarm in the Tall Timber (2004)—James Reasoner
310. Longarm Sets the Stage (2004)—Lou Cameron
311. Longarm and the Devil's Bride (2004)—James Reasoner
312. Longarm and the Two-Bit Posse (2004)
313. Longarm and the Boys in the Back Room (2004)—Lou Cameron
314. Longarm and the Comstock Lode Killers (2005)
315. Longarm and the Lost Patrol (2005)—James Reasoner
316. Longarm and the Unwelcome Woolies (2005)—Lou Cameron
317. Longarm and the Paiute Indian War (2005)
318. Longarm and the Lunatic (2005)
319. Longarm and the Sidekick from Hell (2005)—Lou Cameron
320. Longarm and the Texas Treasure Hunt (2005)—James Reasoner
321. Longarm and the Little Lady (2005)
322. Longarm and the Missing Mistress (2005)
323. Longarm and the Scarlet Rider (2005)—James Reasoner
324. Longarm and Kilgore's Revenge (2005)
325. Longarm and the Horses of a Different Color (2005)
326. Longarm and the Bad Break (2006)
327. Longarm and the Ungrateful Gun (2006)—Lou Cameron
328. Longarm and the Railroad Murders (2006)
329. Longarm and the Restless Redhead (2006)—James Reasoner
330. Longarm and the Apache War (2006)
331. Longarm and the False Prophet (2006)
332. Longarm and the Owlhoots' Graveyard (2006)—James Reasoner
333. Longarm and the Sweetheart Vendetta (2006)
334. Longarm and the Deadly Lover (2006)
335. Longarm and the Missing Marshal (2006)
336. Longarm and the Midnight Mistress (2006)
337. Longarm and the Panther Mountain Shoot-Out (2006)
338. Longarm and the Sabotaged Railroad (2006)
339. Longarm and the Tascosa Two-Step (2007)
340. Longarm and the Holy Smokes Gang (2007)
341. Longarm and the Wolf Women (2007)
342. Longarm and the Bayou Treasure (2007)—James Reasoner
343. Longarm and the Dwarf's Darling (2007)
344. Longarm Meets Blackbeard (2007)
345. Longarm and the Hell Riders (2007)—James Reasoner
346. Longarm and the Ghost of Black Mesa (2007)
347. Longarm and the Guns of Fort Sabre (2007)
348. Longarm and the Dirty Doin's in Hell's Half Acre (2007)
349. Longarm and the Colorado Manhunt (2007)—Frank Roderus
350. Longarm and the Hangtree Vengeance (2007)—James Reasoner
351. Longarm and the Heiress (2008)
352. Longarm and the Pine Box Payoff (2008)—James Reasoner
353. Longarm and the Tiny Thief (2008)
354. Longarm and the Diablo Gold (2008)—Gary McCarthy
355. Longarm and the Mysterious Mr
356. Longarm and the Diamond Sisters (2008)
357. Longarm and the Happiness Killers (2008)
358. Longarm and the Wyoming Woman (2008)—Gary McCarthy
359. Longarm and Lovin' Lizzy (2008)—Gary McCarthy
360. Longarm and the Pecos Promenade (2008)
361. Longarm in Devils River (2008)
362. Longarm and the Crooked Madam (2008)
363. Longarm and the Palo Duro Monster (2009)
364. Longarm and the Missing Bride (2009)
365. Hell Up North (2009)
366. Longarm and the Tin Cup Trouble (2009)
367. Longarm and the Val Verde Massacre (2009)
368. The Gun Trail (2009)
369. Longarm and the Gila River Murders (2009)
370. Longarm and the Shotgun Man (2009)
371. Longarm and Sierra Sue (2009)
372. Longarm and the Pleasant Valley War (2009)
373. Longarm and the Arizona Assassin (2009)
374. Longarm and the Sand Pirates (2009)—James Reasoner
375. Longarm and the Skull Mountain Gold (2010)
376. Longarm and the Innocent Man (2010)
377. Longarm and the Howling Maniac (2010)
378. Longarm and Shotgun Sallie (2010)
379. Longarm and the Deadly Flood (2010)—James Reasoner
380. Longarm and the One-Armed Bandit (2010)
381. Longarm and the Santiago Pistoleers (2010)
382. Longarm on a Monument Valley Manhunt (2010)
383. Longarm and the Killer Countess (2010)
384. Longarm and the Mark of the Cat (2010)
385. Longarm Faces a Hangman's Noose (2010)
386. Longarm in the Lunatic Mountains (2010)
387. Longarm and the Panamint Panic (2011)—James Reasoner
388. Longarm and the Betrayed Bride (2011)
389. Longarm and the Killer Couple (2011)
390. Longarm and the Bloody Relic (2011)—James Reasoner
391. Longarm and the Cross-Fire Girl (2011)
392. Longarm and the Cold Case (2011)
393. Longarm and the Runaway Nurse (2011)
394. Longarm and the Horsewomen of the Apocalypse (2011)—Peter Brandvold
395. Longarm and the Santa Fe Widow (2011)
396. Longarm and the Castle of the Damned (2011)
397. Longarm and the Doomed Beauty (2011)—Peter Brandvold
398. Longarm and the Range War (2011)
399. Longarm and the Grand Canyon Murders (2012)
400. Longarm and the 400 Blows (2012)
401. Longarm and the Night Raiders (2012)
402. Longarm and the Hell Creek Lead Storm (2012)
403. Longarm and Lucky Lucy (2012)e
404. Longarm and Naughty Nellie (2012)
405. Longarm and the Deadly Double-Cross (2012)
406. Longarm and the Mountain Manhunt (2012)
407. Longarm and the Vanishing Lady (2012)
408. Longarm and the Sins of Laughing Lyle (2012)
409. Longarm and the Banker's Daughter (2012)
410. Longarm and the Deadly Restitution (2012)
411. Longarm And The Deadwood Shoot-Out (2013)
412. Longarm and the Cry of the Wolf (2013)
413. Longarm and "Kid" Bodie (2013)
414. Longarm in the Dark (2013)
415. Longarm and Senorita Revenge (2013)
416. Longarm and the Town Full of Trouble (2013)
417. Longarm and The Diamondback Widow (2013)
418. Longarm and the Horse Thief's Daughter (2013)
419. Longarm and The Arapaho Hellcats (2103)
420. Longarm and The Lying Ladies (2013)
421. Longarm and the War Clouds (2013)
422. Longarm and the Star Saloon (2013)
423. Longarm and the Dime Novelist (2014)
424. Longarm and the Great Divide (2014)
425. Longarm and the Yuma Prison (2014)
426. Longarm and the Sonora Siren (2014)
427. Longarm and the Coldest Town in Hell (2014)
428. Longarm and the Death Cave (2014)
429. Longarm and the Lady Lawbreaker (2014)
430. Longarm and the Deadly Sisters (2014)
431. Longarm and the Sharpshooter (2014)
432. Longarm and the Whiskey Runners (2014)
433. Longarm and the Stagecoach Robbers (2014)
434. Longarm and the Rock Springs Reckoning (2014)
435. Longarm and the Missing Husband (2015)
436. Longarm and the Model Prisoner (2015)

Giant editions

- 1. Longarm and the Lone Star Legend (1982)—Fred Feldman
- 2. Longarm and the Lone Star Vengeance (1983)
- 3. Longarm and the Lone Star Bounty (1984)
- 4. Longarm and the Lone Star Rescue (1985)
- 5. Longarm and the Lone Star Deliverance (1985)
- 6. Longarm and the Lone Star Showdown (1986)
- 7. Longarm and the Lone Star Mission (1987)
- 8. Longarm and the Lone Star Frame (1988)
- 9. Longarm and the Lone Star Rustlers (1989)
- 10. Longarm and the Lone Star Captive (1991)
- 12. Longarm and the San Joaquin War (1992)
- 13. Longarm and the Navaho Drums (1993)
- 14. Longarm on the Santee Killing Grounds (1994)
- 15. Longarm and the Unwritten Law (1995)
- 16. Longarm and the Lusty Lady (1996)
- 17. Longarm and the Calgary Kid (1998)—Lou Cameron
- 18. Longarm and the Danish Dames (1999)
- 19. Longarm and the Blue-Eyed Squaw (2000)
- 20. Longarm and the Hangman's Daughter (2001)—Lou Cameron
- 21. Longarm and the Contrary Cowgirls (2002)—Lou Cameron
- 22. Longarm and the Deadly Dead Man (2003)—Lou Cameron
- 23. Longarm and the Bartered Brides (2004)—Lou Cameron
- 24. Longarm and the Undercover Mountie (2005)
- 25. Longarm and the Outlaw Empress (2006)—James Reasoner
- 26. Longarm and the Golden Eagle Shoot-Out (2007)—James Reasoner
- 27. Longarm and the Valley of Skulls (2008)—James Reasoner
- 28. Longarm and the Lone Star Trackdown (2009)—James Reasoner
- 29. Longarm and the Railroad War (2010)—James Reasoner
- 30. Longarm and the Ambush at Holy Defiance (2013)—Peter Brandvold

Note: there is no 11th book in this series.

Double editions

These editions reprint two of the earlier books in the series in a single volume

1. Deputy U.S. Marshall (2008) reprints Longarm and Longarm on the Border
2. Longarm of the Law (2008) reprints Longarm and the Avenging Angels and Longarm and the Wendigo
3. Frontier Justice (2011) reprints Longarm in the Indian Nation and Longarm and the Loggers
4. Legend with a Six-Gun (2012) reprints Longarm and the High Graders and Longarm and the Nesters

== Television film ==
In 1988, a television film titled Longarm was made, loosely based on the novels. The television film was intended to serve as a pilot for a series, but the series was not picked up.
