= The Outsider (1968 TV series) =

- Genre: Detective drama
- Created by: Roy Huggins
- Starring: Darren McGavin
- Composer: Pete Rugolo
- Country of origin: United States
- Original language: English
- No. of seasons: 1
- No. of episodes: 26

Production
- Running time: 60 minutes
- Production companies: Public Arts; Universal Television

Original release
- Network: NBC
- Release: September 18, 1968 – April 16, 1969

The Outsider is an American detective drama created by Roy Huggins and starring Darren McGavin. A two-hour pilot movie aired on November 21, 1967; about a year later, a regular series of 26 episodes aired on NBC for one season from September 18, 1968 to April 16, 1969.

== Premise ==
40-ish Los Angeles–based private eye David Ross (Darren McGavin) was an orphan raised in a group home, originally from Puyallup, Washington. (Series creator Roy Huggins and star Darren McGavin were also originally from Washington state, Huggins from Littell and McGavin from Spokane.) As a teen, Ross became a high-school dropout and a runaway from the group home. At the age of 19, while riding the rails, Ross got into an altercation with a railroad policeman and inadvertently ended up killing him while trying to defend himself. Convicted of murder, he spent six years in prison before receiving a governor's pardon.

Now working as a licensed private investigator, Ross is constantly harassed by police partly for his past crime, and partly due to his activities investigating cases. Ross lives alone in a small, shabby, sparsely furnished apartment in L.A., and is essentially an "outsider" in society.

Most episodes of The Outsider begin near the story's climax, with Ross in some sort of imminent, life-threatening danger. After briefly setting up the situation via narration, Ross will then (also via narration) say some variation of "I suppose you're wondering how I got here..." The story is then presented in flashback, leading back to the climax, which is then resolved.

When investigating cases, Ross only resorts to violence when forced to, and his carry pistol is a tiny .25-caliber semi-automatic. Many of Ross' cases involve eccentric Hollywood or Southern California types, with whom he copes in a bemused fashion. Ross himself has some peculiarities and eccentricities; for instance, he routinely keeps his phone in his fridge.

There were no other regulars on the show aside from McGavin, although Ossie Davis played Ross' antagonistic police contact Lt. Wagner in the pilot, and James Edwards played the same character in two episodes of the series. Bill Quinn is seen in two late-running episodes as another (slightly friendlier) police contact, Lt. Kanter.

== Episodes ==
=== Film pilot (1967) ===
Title	Directed by	Written by	Original release date
The Outsider	Michael Ritchie	Roy Huggins	November 21, 1967
David Ross is hired by a wealthy businessman to see if an employee is embezzling company funds – but embezzlement only seems to be the tip of the iceberg in a complicated case. With Edmond O'Brien, Nancy Malone, Shirley Knight, Sean Garrison, Ossie Davis and Ann Sothern.

=== Series 1 (1968–69) ===
No.	Title	Directed by	Written by	Original release date
1	"For Members Only"	Alexander Singer	Edward J. Lakso	September 18, 1968
Ross goes undercover at a private social club, hired to track down a card shark who's been swindling it's wealthy members. He slowly learns about members of the club, but after a chance encounter shifts the stakes, Ross finds himself in a situation far more serious than he anticipated. Kathie Browne as Anne DuBois, G.D. Spradlin as Kenneth Conrad, and Warren Stevens as Richard Chase.
2	"What Flowers Daisies Are"	Gene Levitt	Benjamin Masselink	September 25, 1968
Ross is hired on a missing-persons case to investigate the disappearance of a model, but what begins as a routine investigation soon reveals signs of fraud and murder. Ross pins Curtis Anderson (played by Farley Granger) as a prime suspect, one of the model’s boyfriends and an executive at a research foundation. As he searches for Anderson, Ross find himself in a much more dangerous situation than he anticipated. With Steve Franken as Roger Edgeway and Booth Colman as Benjamin Seaton.
3	"Along Came a Spider"	Alexander Singer	Joel Murcott	October 2, 1968
Ross is hired by Helen Brunner (Diane Shalet) to recover $6000 she lent to a man who promised to marry her, only to get himself killed instead. His search has him mixed up in a lonely-hearts club, a hard-nosed detective (Claude Akins), gangsters, and the killer. With Marsha Hunt as Dorothy Kingsland.
4	"A Wide Place in the Road"	Sutton Roley	Brian McKay	October 9, 1968
Ross searches for a car thief and bail-jumper named Billy Joe Corey (Joe Don Baker). He follows the trail back to Corey's hometown where the residents, along with the sheriff (Peter Whitney), see the boy as a local hero, leaving Ross as an unwelcome outsider. With Louise Latham as Frances Dustin.
5	"As Cold as Ashes"	Charles S. Dubin	Jack Miller	October 16, 1968
6	"A Time to Run"	Gene Levitt	Edward J. Lakso	October 30, 1968
7	"Love Is Under 'L'"	Murray Golden	Bob and Esther Mitchell	November 6, 1968
8	"The Twenty-Thousand Dollar Carrot"	Michael Ritchie	Robert Hamner	November 13, 1968
9	"One Long Stemmed American Beauty"	Alexander Singer	Shirl Hendryx	November 20, 1968
10	"I Can't Hear You Scream"	Alexander Singer	Edward J. Lakso	November 27, 1968
11	"Tell It Like It Was...and You're Dead"	Alexander Singer	Bernard C. Schoenfeld	December 4, 1968
12	"The Land of the Fox"	John Newland	Benjamin Masselink	December 18, 1968
13	"There Was a Little Girl"	John Peyser	Kay Lenard & Jess Carneol	December 25, 1968
14	"The Girl from Missouri"	Richard Benedict	Edward J. Lakso	January 8, 1969
15	"The Secret of Mareno Bay"	John Llewellyn Moxey	Jerry Devine	January 15, 1969
16	"The Old School Tie"	Phil Rawlins	Brian McKay	January 22, 1969
17	"A Bowl of Cherries"	Michael Caffey	Bob and Esther Mitchell	January 29, 1969
18	"Behind God's Back"	John Newland	Benjamin Masselink	February 5, 1969
19	"Take the Key and Lock Him Up"	Vincent Sherman	Stanley Adams & George F. Slavin	February 12, 1969
20	"The Flip Side"	Gene Levitt	Rita Lakin & Rick Edelstein	February 26, 1969
21	"Handle with Care"	Michael Caffey	Herb Meadow	March 5, 1969
22	"All the Social Graces"	Charles S. Dubin	Edward J. Lakso	March 12, 1969
23	"A Lot of Muscle"	Alexander Singer	Stanley Adams & George F. Slavin	March 26, 1969
24	"Periwinkle Blue"	Richard Benedict	S : Gene Levitt; T : Edward J. Lakso	April 2, 1969
25	"Through a Stained Glass Window"	Charles S. Dubin	Benjamin Masselink	April 9, 1969
26	"Service for One"	Gene Levitt	Don Carpenter	April 16, 1969

Two feature-length television movies were created after the shows cancellation by combining multiple episodes together along with added narration from Darren McGavin. The first of these published in 1969 was Anatomy of a Crime, created by combining episodes "There Was a Little Girl" and "Tell it like it was... and You're Dead". The second aired in November 1970 with the two episodes "The Flip Side" and "Service for One" being edited together and shown under the title The 48-hour Mile. A paperback spinoff novel, The Outsider, was written by prolific American genre writer Lou Cameron.
