= Longarm (film) =

1988 TV film

- Based on: Based on the Jove Books series of the same name written under the house pseudonym, "Tabor Evans".
- Written by: David Chisholm; Tabor Evans
- Directed by: Virgil W. Vogel
- Starring: Daphne Ashbrook; Rene Auberjonois; Diedrich Bader
- Theme music composer: Richard Stone
- Country of origin: United States
- Original language: English

Production
- Executive producer: David Chisholm
- Production locations: Chama, New Mexico; Cook Ranch, Galisteo, New Mexico; Eaves Movie Ranch - 105 Rancho Alegre Road, Santa Fe, New Mexico; Ghost Ranch, Abiquiu, New Mexico
- Cinematography: Robert C. Jessup
- Running time: 73 minutes
- Production companies: Charles E. Sellier Productions; Eaves Movie Ranch; Universal Television

Original release
- Network: ABC
- Release: March 6, 1988

Longarm is a 1988 western television film loosely based on the Jove Books series of the same name written under the house pseudonym, "Tabor Evans".

The film, set in the Territory of New Mexico in the 1870s, stars John Terlesky as the titular Deputy United States Marshal Custis Long, and features René Auberjonois as real-life territorial governor (and author of Ben-Hur: A Tale of the Christ) Lew Wallace. The film was intended as a pilot for a TV series based on the books, but the program was not picked up.

The "occasionally humorous script" was written by David J. Chisholm, a "veteran Western writer".
