= Otu =

Otu or OTU may refer to:

== Places ==
- Otu, Iran, a village in Mazandaran Province, Iran
- Otu, Siga, Japan
- Otú Airport, an airport in the village of Otú and serving the town of Remedios, Colombia

== People with the name ==
- Bassey Otu (born 1959), Nigerian politician
- Michael Otu (1925–2006), senior commander in the Ghana Air Force
- Idara Otu (born 1987), Nigerian sprinter

== Other uses ==
- Ontario Tech University, a postsecondary institution in Ontario, Canada
- Operational taxonomic unit, in biology
- Operational Training Unit (Royal Air Force)
- Optical channel Transport Unit, a layer of the Optical Transport Network
- Oxygen toxicity unit, a measure of exposure to a toxic concentration of oxygen in breathing gas.

== See also ==
- Otu Jeremi, a town in Ughelli South LGA of Delta State, Nigeria
- Otu barrage, a masonry weir on the Ghaggar-Hakra river in Haryana state of India
