= Jason Danino-Holt =

- ג'ייסון דנינו-הולט
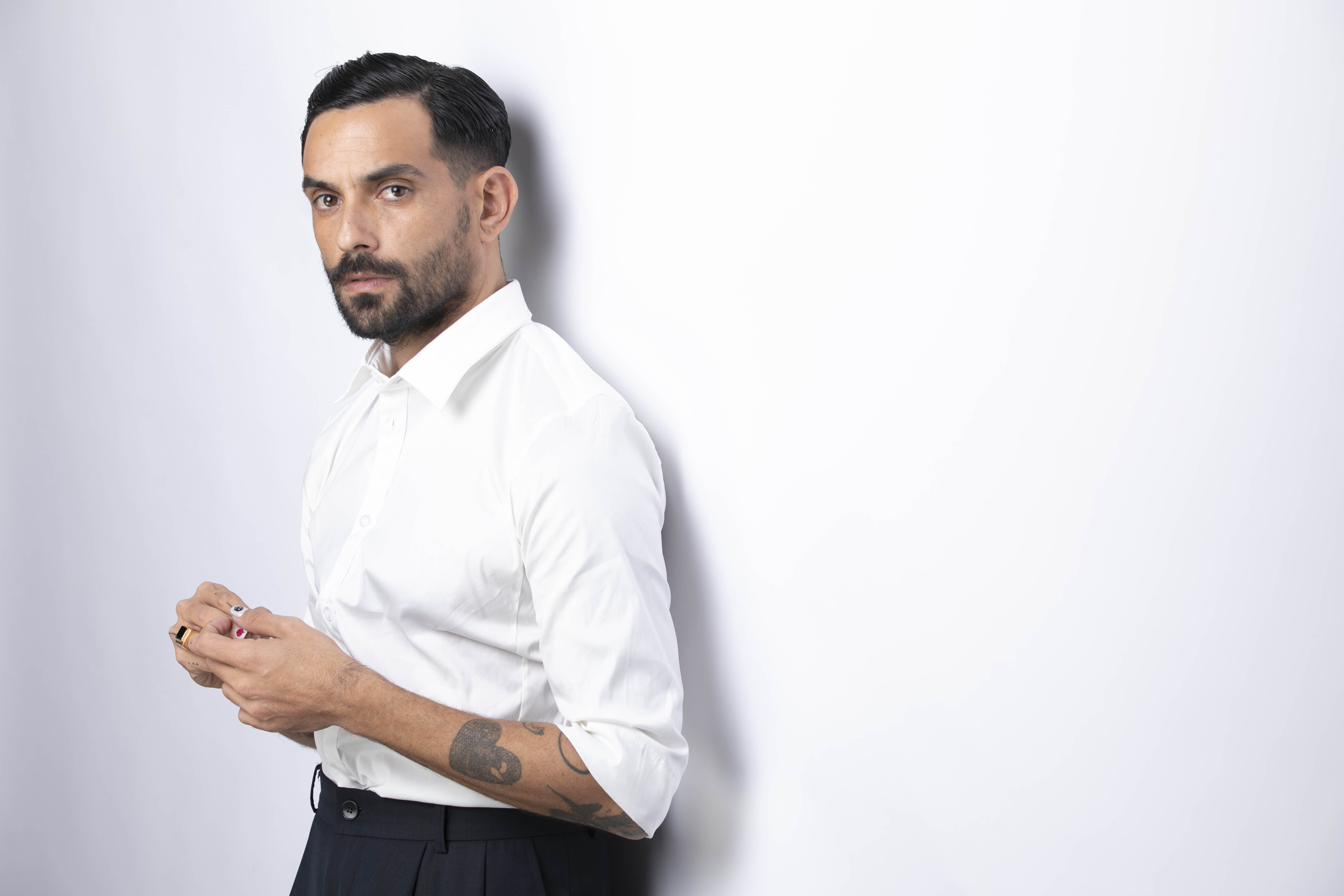
- Born: 17 January 1987 (age 39); Tel Aviv, Israel
- Occupation: Television presenter

Jason Danino-Holt (Hebrew: ג'ייסון דנינו-הולט; born 17 January 1987) is an Israeli theatre maker, artistic director, writer, and performer and former television presenter for MTV Europe and i24news English.

== Early life ==
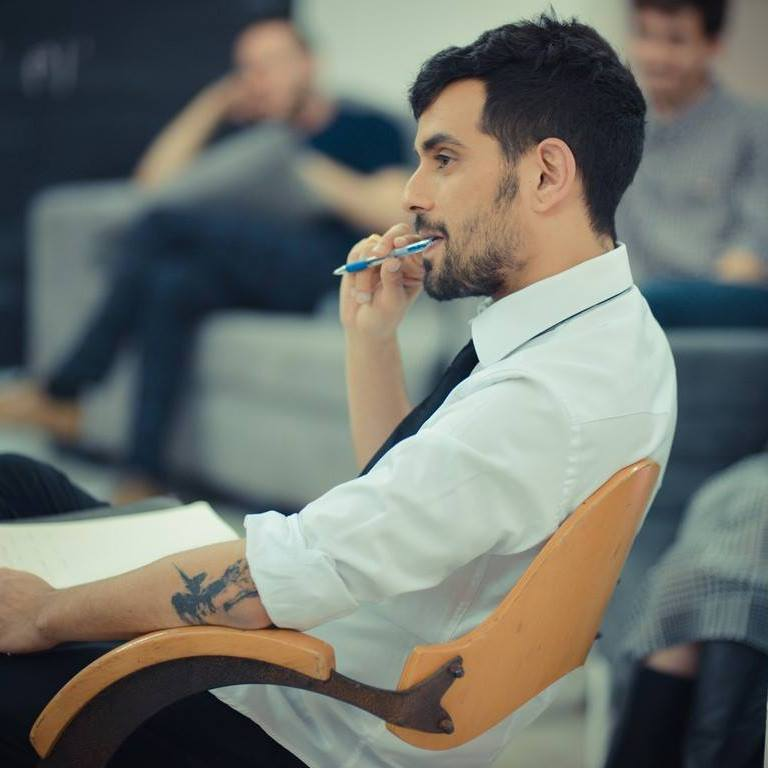
Jason Danino-Holt, 2015

Danino-Holt was born in Tel Aviv, Israel, to a Moroccan French-Canadian mother, Chantal Danino, and a British father, Martin Holt. Raised in a trilingual home, he attended summer school in Cambridge at age 12. He attended Teva School for Nature in Jaffa, following by theatre studies at the Thelma Yellin High School for the Arts and later trained at the Nissan Nativ Acting Studio (2007–2010). He pursued an MFA certificate at Bezalel Academy of Arts and Design (2019–2021). Unlike most of his Israeli contemporaries, he did not serve in the IDF for health reasons.

== Career ==
=== Television ===
In 2005, Danino-Holt was a Nickelodeon presenter in Israel. In 2007, he gave Israel's votes during the Eurovision Song Contest in Helsinki, and during the same week hosted a special show dedicated to the song contest on IBA.

In 2008 Danino-Holt moved to London and hosted Switched On for MTV Europe. After returning to Israel he took part in the reality-documentary series Mehubarim (Connected) aired on HOT, in which he shared intimate, self-documented perspective on his life.

Between 2014 and 2017 he anchored "The Tube" on i24News English, covering digital culture and media trends.

=== Theatre and performance art ===
In 2016, Danino-Holt co-founded Habait Theatre with Marina Beltov-Grass, with the support of the Alexander Grass Foundation. Located in the Jaffa Flea Market, it serves as a platform for independent, experimental stage-art performances and has received critical acclaim for its innovative productions.

Danino-Holt formalized his independent theatre-making into "Jason Danino-Holt Company" in 2019, expanding his artistic vision internationally. His work blends confessional storytelling with immersive theater, focusing on queer identity, autobiography, and vulnerability.

=== Notable works ===
- Shanti & Martin (2010) – A documentary exploring a complex mother-son relationship, premiered at the DocAviv Festival.
- Hamutz (2013) – A modern Greek/South Tel Aviv tragedy about a sex worker at the brink of death, confronting human despair and fleeting moments of compassion. Premiered with support from Mifal HaPais.
- Not Letting It In (2015) – A confessional performance exploring vulnerability and storytelling, performed internationally in multiple formats. The show has been staged in various locations worldwide, including Tel Aviv, Berlin, Athens, Paris, Munich, and the United States. The format of the show has evolved over time, with durations ranging from two hours to 24-hour marathon performances featuring rotating casts and audience engagement.
- He Came to Berlin to Die (2017) – A multidisciplinary performance exploring Berlin’s mythos through personal and historical narratives. Developed at Akademie der Künste, Berlin, in collaboration with Gesher Theatre.
- Y&Y1Y (2019) – A performance installation where site-specific questions were inscribed on the floor with silver duct tape, inviting public interaction. Premiered at Mishkan Museum of Art, Ein Harod.
- Cleansed (2020) – A text-based exhibition-performance at Indie Photography Group Gallery, inspired by Sarah Kane’s Cleansed, featuring silk-printed text on white underwear as wearable performance pieces.
- Monogamy Kills (2021) – A solo exhibition blending performance, visual art, and branding, interrogating the male gaze and consumerism, staged at Alfred Gallery.
- Name Drop (2022) – A theatrical work at Cameri Theatre examining personal experiences through music.
- HD (2023) – A devised theatre project featuring transgender non-actors, produced by Paramount Studios.
- Marcel (2024) – An adult puppet theatre musical, co-created with Meital Raz, that explores dreams, aging, and creative obsession. Premiered at the Jerusalem Comedy Festival, where it won Best Production & Best Direction awards. Ongoing performances at HABAIT Theatre.

== Awards, grants, and fellowships ==
- Best Production & Best Direction Awards – Marcel, Jerusalem Comedy Festival.
- Theatre's Future Grant – Tel Aviv City Council for Young Playwrights (2021).
- Rozenblum Prize – Best Young Artist (2016).
- Short Story Award – Haaretz Competition (2019).
- Opening Point Grant (נקודת פתיחה) – Hamutz, Mifal HaPais (2013).
- Best Actor & Best Actress Awards – Hamutz, TLVMedia Fest (Jason Danino-Holt & Evelin Hagoel).
- Fellowships:
  - Cité des Arts, Paris (2019, Literature Department)
  - Akademie der Künste, Berlin (2017).

== Personal life ==
Danino-Holt publicly came out as gay in 2008 and has since been an advocate for LGBTQ+ representation in the arts. His work frequently explores themes of queer identity, personal narrative, and social introspection. Based in Tel Aviv, he frequently works internationally on artistic residencies and collaborations.
