= List of Robotech episodes =

Robotech is an 85-episode adaptation of three different Japanese anime science fiction television series, Super Dimension Fortress Macross, Super Dimension Cavalry Southern Cross and Genesis Climber Mospeada, under the direction of Carl Macek. Robotech was originally aired in syndication starting in 1985 and has been seen in North America, Australia, the Philippines, Hong Kong, South Africa, and Europe. Within the combined and edited story, Robotechnology refers to the scientific advances discovered in an alien starship that crashed on a South Pacific island. With this technology, Earth developed giant robotic machines (many of which were capable of transforming into vehicles) to fight three successive extraterrestrial invasions.

== Episode list ==
=== Part 1: The Macross Saga ===
No.	Title	Directed by	Written by
1	"Boobytrap"	Robert V. Barron	Steve Kramer
An abandoned alien battle fortress crash-lands on Earth in 1999, stopping a world war in the process. The international scientific community spends the next ten years reconstructing the damaged ship, called the SDF-1. At the ship's launch in 2009, a race of giant alien warriors, the Zentraedi, appear and attack Earth in a bid to capture the vessel. Young sport pilot Rick Hunter has his first experience with a rather odd fighter plane.
2	"Countdown"	Robert V. Barron	Steve Kramer
The Zentraedi troops assault Macross Island to capture the SDF-1, which fails a liftoff attempt. After witnessing the transformation of his Veritech fighter plane, Rick rescues a young girl named Lynn Minmei.
3	"Space Fold"	Robert V. Barron	Steve Kramer
The SDF-1 successfully flies off Macross Island to link up with other Earth forces in orbit. A Zentraedi ambush forces SDF-1 skipper Captain Gloval to go back to Macross Island and attempt a hyperspace jump. The consequences of the jump turn out to be totally unexpected. Meanwhile, Rick tries to bring Minmei back to her family, but crashland in a section of the SDF-1.
4	"The Long Wait"	Robert V. Barron	Steve Kramer
Rick and Minmei try to survive inside the uncharted space of the SDF-1 where they crash-landed, but are eventually stumbled upon and rescued by construction crews assigned to rebuild Macross City inside the ship.
5	"Transformation"	Robert V. Barron	Steve Kramer
Having been rescued from the fallout shelters of whatever is left of Macross Island, the citizens attempt to normalize their life aboard the giant battle fortress. Roy Fokker encourages Rick to join the Robotech Defense Force. The SDF-1 crew discover that the spacefold drive they used to make the jump has disappeared, but stumble upon an idea to transform the ship. The idea is soon tested in a battle with the Zentraedi, but renders much damage to Macross City.
6	"Blitzkrieg"	Robert V. Barron	Steve Kramer
The SDF-1 crew rebuilds Macross City once more to take the transformation into account. Rick takes up Roy's advice and joins the Robotech Defense Force, which plans to break through the Zentraedi blockade at Saturn's rings.
7	"Bye-Bye Mars"	Robert V. Barron	Steve Kramer
The SDF-1, transformed back into ship mode once more, arrives at a human outpost on Mars to gather fresh supplies, but discover that the base was damaged in a battle years before and had no survivors. However, the Zentraedi lie in wait with a new commander, Khyron, raring for glory by using gravity mines to trap the ship. In the midst of the fight, SDF-1 First Officer Lisa Hayes tries to find out whether her old fiance, Carl Riber, is still alive.
8	"Sweet Sixteen"	Robert V. Barron	Steve Kramer
Awarded a medal for saving Lisa in Mars, Rick is promoted to lieutenant and introduced to his new wingmen, Ben Dixon and Max Sterling. However, an attack by Khyron distracts him from another thing on his mind - attending Minmei's 16th birthday.
9	"Miss Macross"	Robert V. Barron	Steve Kramer
Minmei joins the Miss Macross pageant while Rick Hunter is sent on patrol. The Zentraedi use the opportunity to study human culture further by sending a reconnaissance craft to tap on the pageant broadcast.
10	"Blind Game"	Robert V. Barron	Steve Kramer
An unauthorized assault by Khyron on an asteroid damages the SDF-1's radar systems, forcing Lisa to go on a scout mission with Rick, Max, and Ben protecting her. The Zentraedi ambush Lisa and brings her to Breetai's flagship, where the three pilots come face to face with Breetai himself.
11	"First Contact"	Robert V. Barron	Steve Kramer
Rick, Lisa, and Ben are captured and brought before Zentraedi leader Dolza. They witness the awesome power and destructive capability of their alien adversaries, but also discover their captors are mysteriously disturbed by something entirely different. Minmei's victory in the Miss Macross pageant opens many opportunities for her.
12	"The Big Escape"	Robert V. Barron	Steve Kramer
Held captive in a Zentraedi prison cell, Rick, Lisa, and Ben try to figure a way off the massive alien ship. With his fighter still intact, Max sneaks his way through the Zentraedi ship and finds his comrades. A fierce gunfight allows the humans to find a battlepod and return to Captain Gloval and the crew of the SDF-1. Because the humans escaped on his watch, Breetai is relieved of command and replaced with Azonia. The three pilots who observed the Miss Macross pageant - Rico, Konda, and Bron - volunteer to be micronized and infiltrate the SDF-1 to gather more intelligence about the humans.
13	"Blue Wind"	Robert V. Barron	Steve Kramer
Rick, Lisa, Max and Ben are debriefed regarding their capture by the Zentraedi. Azonia stops Khyron from attacking the SDF-1 again, allowing the crew to safely reenter Earth's atmosphere.
14	"Gloval's Report"	Robert V. Barron	Steve Kramer
While the SDF-1 passengers and crew celebrate their arrival, Captain Gloval makes his recollections on the SDF-1's journey across the Solar System. NOTE: This episode is a clip show that recaps the previous 13 episodes.
15	"Homecoming"	Robert V. Barron	Steve Kramer
Rick secretly flies Minmei to Japan to visit her family in Yokohama, but things go sour as Minmei defies her parents' wishes to stay with them. Her pacifist cousin, Lynn Kyle, offers to watch over her as they fly back to the SDF-1. Meanwhile, Captain Gloval and Lisa Hayes fly to the United Earth Government's (UEG) headquarters in Alaska to be debriefed on the voyage and the Zentraedi's battle capabilities. However, they discover that the UEG leadership covered up the SDF-1's spacefold jump, claiming to the world that anti-unification rebels detonated nuclear weapons on the place.
16	"Battle Cry"	Robert V. Barron	Steve Kramer
Lynn Kyle's presence suddenly reminds Lisa of her lost fiance, Carl Riber. Khyron executes another attack on the SDF-1. The human forces beat back the Zentraedi, but Lisa's execution of the Daedalus Maneuver catches Rick in the crossfire.
17	"Phantasm"	Robert V. Barron	Steve Kramer
Wounded from the attack in the previous episode, Rick Hunter lies in a hospital bed in critical condition. At the same time, he experiences dreams that try to make sense out of his relationship with Minmei and his growing attraction to Lisa Hayes.
18	"Farewell, Big Brother"	Robert V. Barron	Steve Kramer
As Rick recuperates, Roy tries to convince Minmei to take a break from her busy schedule and visit her friend. A female Zentraedi power armor pilot named Miriya is intrigued by Khyron's hints about a human ace pilot who could be more of a match for her and sets out to find him. Roy prepares to go into battle... perhaps for the last time.
19	"Bursting Point"	Robert V. Barron	Steve Kramer
After broadcasting appeals for a safe haven, Captain Gloval receives an offer from Toronto, Ontario Quadrant in Canada about accepting the SDF-1's 56,000 refugees while planning a test of a new omnidirectional barrier shield. A sudden attack by the Zentraedi overloads the barrier system and destroys the alien force, but it also kills Ben and lays waste to an entire city below the battle fortress.
20	"Paradise Lost"	Robert V. Barron	Steve Kramer
The fallout from the previous episode's battle forces the United Earth Government to banish the SDF-1 from the planet with the necessary supplies to send them on their way. Shocked by the battle's outcome, Zentraedi leader Dolza gives Breetai a million-ship fleet to deal with the SDF-1. The Zentraedi spies - Rico, Konda, and Bron - escape the vessel and report back to Breetai on their mission. After seeing Captain Gloval break down while announcing the UEG's banishment order, Minmei comes to his side and encourages the people and crew of the SDF-1 to pull themselves together.
21	"A New Dawn"	Robert V. Barron	Steve Kramer
Minmei and Lynn Kyle's first movie, Little White Dragon, becomes the talk of the town, as crowds gather for the premiere. Left unease by the cousins' love scenes, Rick and Lisa walk out of the movie theater. An unpleasant accident results in the two of them taking a walk together, but the bond grows closer in the midst of the SDF-1's latest transformation during a Zentraedi attack. The Zentraedi themselves are also disturbed by the movie, especially when they think Lynn Kyle's fight stunts indicate superhuman abilities.
22	"Battle Hymn"	Robert V. Barron	Steve Kramer
Khyron personally leads another attack on the SDF-1 while Breetai, Exedore, and Dolza discuss their next action against the humans. However, Rico, Konda, and Bron's retelling of their experiences aboard the ship encourages their fellow Zentraedi soldiers to defect. The SDF-1 tries a Daedalus Maneuver on Breetai's flagship, where the Zentraedi breaks through the Destroid force to enter the SDF-1 and wreak havoc. Yet, through all the fighting and confusion, Minmei still manages to sing for the bewildered citizens of Macross City, giving them a small ray of hope in their darkest hour.
23	"Reckless"	Robert V. Barron	Steve Kramer
The battle inside Macross City rages and Khyron appears to carry the day at last - until many of his soldiers suddenly desert and try to find Minmei. The Zentraedi defectors are given political asylum.
24	"Showdown"	Robert V. Barron	Steve Kramer
Lisa Hayes returns to Earth and try to convince the United Earth Government - especially her father - to negotiate with the Zentraedi armada. Later at a video arcade, Miriya, who has infiltrated the SDF-1, finally comes face-to-face with the ace pilot she has been intrigued with for a long time - Max Sterling, who proves to be a powerful opponent.
25	"Wedding Bells"	Robert V. Barron	Steve Kramer
Euphoric over his arcade victory, Max asks Miriya out for a date, but defeats her a second time after she tries to kill him, which eventually results in the two of them getting married. Touched by the footage of the wedding, more Zentraedi within Breetai's fleet openly refuse to launch another attack against the humans, as Dolza directs their immediate destruction.
26	"The Messenger"	Robert V. Barron	Steve Kramer
An uneasy truce is called as the Zentraedi send a micronized Exedore to the SDF-1 for peace talks. This move not only shocks the citizens of the SDF-1, but also fuels the already smoldering fires of ambition in Khyron.
27	"Force of Arms"	Robert V. Barron	Steve Kramer
Concerned by the growing numbers of Zentraedi soldiers who have been exposed to human culture, Dolza's main armada of five million ships finally appears and lays waste to Earth. Despite the carnage, Rick encourages Minmei to rally the SDF-1 and its newfound Zentraedi allies in a battle against Dolza's forces.
28	"Reconstruction Blues"	Robert V. Barron	Steve Kramer
Two years after the battle for Earth, the crew of the SDF-1 take stock of the devastation and begin to pick up the pieces.
29	"The Robotech Masters"	Robert V. Barron	Steve Kramer
The Robotech Masters learn of the SDF-1's location and prepare for a journey to Earth. Meanwhile, some Zentraedi who are tired of civilian life have returned to their military ways. Khyron, who has been dormant since the big battle for Earth, reemerges to rally all Zentraedi forces who want to carry on the fight against the humans.
30	"Viva Miriya"	Robert V. Barron	Steve Kramer
The survivors of the SDF-1 and Breetai come together to convince a Zentraedi force at a Robotech Factory to join in an alliance for peace. Max and Miriya bring along their baby, Dana, to press their point. Elsewhere in the galaxy, the Robotech Masters, lamenting on the defeat of the Zentraedi, discuss how to clone Zor, the creator of Robotechnology.
31	"Khyron's Revenge"	Robert V. Barron	Steve Kramer
Khyron begins his campaign by hijacking the last existing Protoculture chamber in New Detroit to help more micronized Zentraedi get back to their original size. Captain Gloval and Exedore study the origins of the Zentraedi and learn more about the Robotech Masters.
32	"Broken Heart"	Robert V. Barron	Steve Kramer
Khyron's forces assault a Minmei concert and take the singer and Lynn Kyle hostage in exchange for the SDF-1. Rick and Lisa spearhead a rescue mission.
33	"A Rainy Night"	Robert V. Barron	Steve Kramer
Lisa is distraught over Rick and Minmei's mutual feelings for each other. To cheer her up, fellow bridge officer Claudia Grant brings her to her quarters and recounts the story of how she met Roy Fokker.
34	"Private Time"	Robert V. Barron	Steve Kramer
Rick invites Lisa to a picnic, but his detour to meet Minmei at Monument City - and a subsequent Zentraedi attack at a nearby base - ruins what should have been their perfect time together. Minmei, on the other hand, is fed up with Lynn Kyle's interfering in her affairs and parts ways with him after her concert the same day, where she refused to sing.
35	"Season's Greetings"	Robert V. Barron	Steve Kramer
Lacking enough power to fully energize a derelict Zentraedi Gun Destroyer lying in the Amazon rainforest, Khyron plans an attack to capture the Protoculture Matrix on the most unusual of days - Christmas Day. Having decided to end her music career, Minmei comes to the only person she could possibly spend the holidays with.
36	"To the Stars"	Robert V. Barron	Steve Kramer
Emboldened by the Protoculture Matrix powering his battleship, Khyron takes one last stab at the SDF-1. Lisa considers resigning from the service until Admiral Gloval assigns her to lead the mission to find the Robotech Masters. The resulting battle finally affirms Rick's feelings for Lisa, but Minmei is left hanging.

=== Part 2: The Masters ===
No.	Title	Directed by	Written by
37	"Dana's Story"	Robert V. Barron	Steve Kramer
The United Earth Forces Military Academy produces its first batch of officers for the Army of the Southern Cross, including 2nd Lts Dana Sterling and Bowie Grant. Bowie is uneasy about being commissioned into the armed forces, but Dana helps him get over it by telling the story of how her famous parents met. The narration is interrupted by the in-system appearance of the Robotech Masters after a 15-year trip.
38	"False Start"	Robert V. Barron	Steve Kramer
Dana is thrown into the brig after running afoul of Tactical Armored Space Corps (TASC) officer First Lieutenant Marie Crystal but is released in time for the Southern Cross' first ground-based encounter with the Robotech Masters. The aliens are caught by surprise at the human forces' capabilities. Dana's skills during the battle earns command of the 15th Alpha Tactical Armored Corps (ATAC) after its commanding officer, Captain Sean Phillips, is demoted to private second-class for flirting with a colonel's daughter. Dana is intrigued by visions of a red Bioroid and its pilot.
39	"Southern Cross"	Robert V. Barron	Steve Kramer
The 15th Squadron is assigned civil defense duty during an aerial offensive. Dana initially laments the posting, especially when she sees the Masters' counterattack fall upon her base but proves her worth when she orders the 15th ATAC into action. Dana is promoted to first lieutenant after her team repulses the aliens.
40	"Volunteers"	Robert V. Barron	Steve Kramer
Answering a call for volunteers, Dana and members of the 15th ATAC join forces with Marie Crystal in an operation to reestablish communications with Space Station Liberty, which lost contact with Earth shortly after the Robotech Masters' arrival.
41	"Half Moon"	Robert V. Barron	Steve Kramer
Dana and Bowie stumble into an excavation operation by the Robotech Masters in the remains of what was once New Macross City, centered on the earthen mounds that hold the remains of the SDF-1, SDF-2 and Khyron's battlecruiser. Bowie is captured. Enraged by her superiors' refusal to authorize a rescue operation, Dana fakes a late-night training exercise to launch the mission herself.
42	"Danger Zone"	Robert V. Barron	Steve Kramer
An impulsive frontal assault ordered by Supreme Commander Anatole Leonard against the Masters' flagship results in the Southern Cross Tactical Armored Space Corps (TASC) hit with heavy losses. Corporal Louie Nichols, one of Dana's troopers, theorizes a potential weakness, and Dana gets approval for a different tactic. Their subsequent attack succeeds in bringing the flagship down to Earth. Meanwhile, Earth scientists study the remains of a Bioroid pilot and discover that the intruders are human, not micronized Zentraedi.
43	"Prelude To Battle"	Robert V. Barron	Steve Kramer
The 15th Squadron's successes make them the military's talk of the town as they are selected for another dangerous mission. The unit is hampered by Bowie's behavior, which has caused him to be arrested twice by Global Military Police (GMP) Lieutenant Nova Satori. Dana decides to leave him to his fate, but his guardian, General Rolf Emerson, intervenes to get him out of the stockade in time for the mission to begin.
44	"The Trap"	Robert V. Barron	Steve Kramer
The 15th ATAC penetrates the Robotech Masters' flagship, where Bowie encounters a beautiful alien woman who shares his love for music. The Masters entrap the team, but they fight their way out, capturing an enemy Bioroid in the process.
45	"Metal Fire"	Robert V. Barron	Steve Kramer
The Southern Cross High Command reviews the footage of the 15th Squadron's reconnaissance of the alien ship and concludes that the Robotech Masters are probably after the remains of the Protoculture Matrix. Commander Leonard rules out negotiations with the aliens. The Masters are frustrated by their failures to clone Robotech genius Zor and consider getting humans as test subjects.
46	"Star Dust"	Robert V. Barron	Steve Kramer
Raiding parties launched by the Robotech Masters capture at least 200 people, who are subjected to a series of mental probes to determine the extent of their knowledge of Protoculture. Back at Southern Cross Army headquarters, Dana fails to stop Supreme Commander Leonard's "disposal" of a captured Bioroid pilot but is disturbed further by visions of the red Bioroid. The Masters' flagship is successfully rescued by another of their ships despite last-minute intervention by Dana and a GMP operative.
47	"Outsiders"	Robert V. Barron	Steve Kramer
The red Bioroid pilot of Dana's visions is captured by the Southern Cross, part of a plan by the Robotech Masters to implant a sleeper agent. Out in space, a ship from the SDF-3 expedition de-folds from hyperspace and attempts to engage the Masters' fleet but is destroyed. Supreme Commander Leonard and General Emerson debrief Major John Carpenter, the ship's commanding officer, who informs them that the Robotech Expeditionary Force will not be sending any more combat units back to Earth.
48	"Deja Vu"	Robert V. Barron	Steve Kramer
Nova Satori leads the interrogation of the alien Bioroid pilot, identified only as Zor. The interrogators are convinced that he is one of the humans kidnapped as a test subject. Meanwhile, Dana practices on a battle simulator hoping to explain her empathy for the alien while Sean Phillips tries his moves on Marie Crystal.
49	"A New Recruit"	Robert V. Barron	Steve Kramer
Zor is enlisted into the 15th ATAC in a bid to help restore his memory in the hopes that he will be able to provide valuable insight into the plans of the Masters. Dana is more than eager to help him settle in, but not everyone in the team feels the same way - especially those who lost loved ones at the hands of the aliens. The Masters carefully observe Zor's vision through a neurosensor.
50	"Triumvirate"	Robert V. Barron	Steve Kramer
Equipped with new Armored Gyro Assault Copters and a fleet of battlecruisers, the TASC unleashes a preemptive strike on the Robotech Masters' fleet but suffers heavy losses. While the 15th Squadron are kept in reserve duty, Zor, Dana, and Bowie decide to visit the ruins of the SDF-1, SDF-2, and Khyron's battlecruiser to help Zor rebuild his memories. Inside the remains of the SDF-1, they discover the fabled Matrix, which is an eerie garden of unearthly flowers bathed in light from a rainbow vortex. Marie Crystal reports that Zor's claim of triplicate organization among the Masters forces may have merit.
51	"Clone Chamber"	Robert V. Barron	Steve Kramer
The survivors of the TASC assault force regroup at Moon Base ALUCE. It becomes the least of the Robotech Masters' worries as they view images of Zor's journey into the ruins and discover that the Flower of Life is beginning to bloom. The TASC mounts a rescue of the surviving battleships but Zor's unwitting observance of the task force's deployment allows the aliens to turn the tables on them. Marie Crystal intervenes to save the relief force from the surprise attack.
52	"Love Song"	Robert V. Barron	Steve Kramer
Sean Philips takes Marie Crystal out on a date, but another woman's appearance messes up the moment. Supreme Commander Leonard appoints General Emerson to lead a reinforcement group to Moon Base ALUCE as part of a plan to carry out a two-pronged attack on the Robotech Masters' warships.
53	"The Hunters"	Robert V. Barron	Steve Kramer
Louie Nichols designs a new battle simulator but the Global Military Police redevelops it and installs it in the team's Hovertanks as an automatic targeting system. Distraught by the sudden corruption of his device, Nichols seeks Dana's help in destroying the machines, but Zor and Angelo Dante stop them. General Emerson's forces use a novel tactic to break through the Masters' blockade. The Robotech Masters start producing a new Bioroid in anticipation of the human attack.
54	"Mind Games"	Robert V. Barron	Steve Kramer
The ALUCE forces link up with those coming from Earth for the attack on the Robotech Masters' fleet, with the intention of invading the ships themselves. Bowie is uneasy about going to battle after Zor airs his concerns about getting back alive. However, a sudden counterattack by the Masters' other ships forces the humans to pull back, leaving the 15th Squadron behind inside the Masters' flagship. In the midst of the chaos, the Masters reclaim control over Zor Prime.
55	"Dana In Wonderland"	Robert V. Barron	Steve Kramer
Dana Sterling and the 15th Squadron are trapped inside the Robotech Masters' flagship, but avoid capture by temporarily leaving their Hovertanks to learn more about the alien society inside the vessel. Bowie uses the opportunity to find Musica, the alien girl he encountered on the flagship during its brief time downed on Earth. A rogue clone risks his life to help Dana understand more about the aliens. The entire team is eventually captured.
56	"Crisis Point"	Robert V. Barron	Steve Kramer
Like the Zentraedi before her, Musica's interactions with human emotions prompts her to rebel and break the 15th Squadron survivors out of captivity. The group escape the ship as it explodes, but not before rescuing Zor, whose memory has been fully reinstated by the Robotech Masters' scientists.
57	"Daydreamer"	Robert V. Barron	Steve Kramer
The 15th Squadron successfully return to Earth, but the heavy GMP presence at the Earth forces' base forces them to hatch a plan to smuggle Musica through security. After a heated argument with Angelo Dante on surviving the war, Zor tips off Nova Satori about Musica, who feels guilty over leaving her sisters behind to be arrested for treason. Satori marches to the 15th's barracks while Musica sings a song about the Flowers of Life. Nova threatens to arrest the entire unit unless they give up Musica, but she has escaped with Bowie. The Masters grow increasingly concerned over the brewing individualities of some of their crew, their dwindling Protoculture stocks mutating into the Flower of Life, and the threat of an alien race called "the Invid."
58	"Final Nightmare"	Robert V. Barron	Steve Kramer
Bowie and Musica hide in the forest for most of the night and grow closer as Nova Satori orders the 15th Squadron to find them. They all meet inside the ruins of the SDF-1, where they realize for the first time that they are looking at the Protoculture Matrix. Zor explains his origins and connection with the flowers. The Robotech Masters decide to launch one final assault against the Southern Cross forces to recover any Protoculture stocks before the Invid arrive. The Southern Cross begins its own offensive against the aliens.
59	"The Invid Connection"	Robert V. Barron	Steve Kramer
Nova stops her plan to arrest Musica, but GMP forces assemble at the tombs. The Robotech Masters employ all their soldiers as special shock troopers and deploy them against the human forces to buy time for some of their ships to recover the Protoculture Matrix. The Robotech Masters, who have captured General Emerson as he, Marie Crystal, and TASC pilot Ronald Brown escape from his self-destructing flagship, demand that all humans evacuate Earth in 48 hours or face total extermination. The 15th Squadron fly to the Masters' flagship to return Musica in exchange for the human captives, but it is a trap. General Emerson sacrifices his life to save Bowie in a subsequent battle. Zor appears again in his red Bioroid and prepares to hunt down the Masters.
60	"Catastrophe"	Robert V. Barron	Steve Kramer
Zor and Dana confront the Robotech Masters, where she has a vision of her parents and an unknown younger sister, who warns her about the Invid. Musica is reunited with her sisters, one of whom is killed. The other helps her, along with the 15th Squadron and Nova, evacuate all surviving clones from the flagship after a brief firefight with some defenders. The Southern Cross forces make their last stand against the Masters' assault. Monument City is destroyed and Commander Leonard is killed. Zor kills the Robotech Masters then sends off Dana in an escape pod. He self-destructs the ship over the remains of the SDF-1, but the resulting explosion only spreads the Flower of Life's spores across the planet.

=== Part 3: The New Generation ===
No.	Title	Directed by	Written by
61	"The Invid Invasion"	Robert V. Barron	Steve Kramer
Sometime after the events of "Catastrophe," the Invid finally appear over Earth, and conquer the planet despite meager resistance by the surviving Southern Cross forces. Over a decade later, the Robotech Expeditionary Force's (REF) Mars Division is sent to Earth to try attacking Reflex Point, the Invid's main hive, in North America, but the entire fleet is annihilated by Invid forces. The debacle's only survivor, Scott Bernard, crashes somewhere in South America and begins a long journey to Reflex Point in his Cyclone motorcycle. A survivalist named Rand joins him after he is saved by Scott from Invid Shocktroopers while scavenging a crashed Mars Division Horizont-class shuttle.
62	"The Lost City"	Robert V. Barron	Steve Kramer
Scott and Rand visit a city hoping to recruit new resistance fighters and get fresh supplies, but they are lured into a trap at an island where other military forces have been killed off by Invid units. The duo survive the battle with help from a mysterious red Cyclone-rider. However, the residents, who want to live in peace, force them to leave. A teenage girl named Annie decides to join them on the way out.
63	"Lonely Soldier Boy"	Robert V. Barron	Steve Kramer
While visiting a new town, Scott, Rand, and Annie chance upon a concert featuring famed female pop singer Yellow Dancer. A large male ex-soldier named Lunk, and Rook Bartley, the woman who piloted the red Cyclone, also join the group after fighting together during an encounter with the Invid. Lunk also provides Scott with an Alpha fighter he stowed in a barn. Rand, who is a loyal Yellow Dancer-fan, is devastated when it turns out that his idol is a male resistance fighter named Lancer in disguise.
64	"Survival"	Robert V. Barron	Steve Kramer
The Invid have trapped Scott Bernard and his team in a secluded forest. Rand discovers that the Invid can track the use of Protoculture.
65	"Curtain Call"	Robert V. Barron	Steve Kramer
Desperately low on Protoculture and basic supplies, Scott's group finds a castle that doubles as an Invid Protoculture storage facility. Lancer, in his Yellow Dancer disguise, holds a concert in a nearby town where even the storage facility's guards are assigned as venue security. It buys the rest of the team enough time to infiltrate the facility and haul off as many Protoculture cells as they can carry. The guards catch on to the plan, but the team gets away in time.
66	"Hard Times"	Robert V. Barron	Steve Kramer
Rook Bartley returns to her hometown inside a deep canyon to reconcile with her past as a biker gang-member. The team fails to stop her from getting revenge on a fellow gang-member who seemingly sold her out to a rival gang.
67	"Paper Hero"	Robert V. Barron	Steve Kramer
Lunk makes a slight detour to an old friend's hometown, where he needs to return a book to his friend's father, Alfred Nader. However, the town mayor's goons suddenly steal their vehicles and abduct Rook and Annie, while the guys find Nader. Lunk discovers that Nader was killed, and all but declared a non-person by the community for advocating passive resistance to the Invid. The Invid assault the town. To prevent it from being destroyed, the mayor gives back the team's vehicles, and also presents Lunk with a weapon Nader had hidden for years, which he uses to fight off the Invid-attack.
68	"Eulogy"	Robert V. Barron	Steve Kramer
Scott and his team visit a town of soldiers, where they meet veteran Robotech Expeditionary Force officer Colonel Jonathan Wolff, who has been on Earth for some time leading an ostensible resistance against the Invid. However, the team discovers that Wolff is a traitor who organizes futile raids against Invid forces in exchange for Protoculture, leaving himself as a (frequently the only) survivor to underpin his legend. He finally dies on another raid that includes the team.
69	"The Genesis Pit"	Robert V. Barron	Steve Kramer
While still on the journey to Reflex Point, Scott, Rand and Annie stumble upon a large cave called the Genesis Pit, a cave which is a special Invid research facility where the aliens are working on evolutionary experiments. They are forced to fight their way out to avoid being trapped in the Pit.
70	"Enter Marlene"	Robert V. Barron	Steve Kramer
Enthusiastic about linking up with other REF units at a nearby rally point, Scott prods the team to continue fighting alongside him and the rest of the REF. He is devastated when the team discovers that the rendezvous location, Point K, has been totally destroyed along with a nearby village. Another encounter with the Invid amidst the wreckage shakes Scott out of his stupor long enough to kill all of the attackers. Lancer, Lunk, and Annie scour the wreckage for salvage and comes up with significant findings, including two additional Alpha fighters and a Beta fighter. Meanwhile, Rand and Rook search the village, where they find a naked woman and bring her along. The woman, whom the team calls Marlene, is actually a humanoid Invid spy named Ariel.
71	"The Secret Route"	Robert V. Barron	Steve Kramer
While trying to negotiate a mountain pass, an avalanche forces Scott's team to visit a nearby town for new directions. They later discover that the town mayor, Donald Maxwell, is selling fake maps to families seeking to drive through the pass, where Invid units will ambush them. Lancer reveals to the team the story behind his Yellow Dancer persona upon seeing his old girlfriend, who is Maxwell's fiancee. After the team saves Annie and a family she wanted to join on the journey, Maxwell has a change of heart and sacrifices his antique aircraft collection to fight off the Invid while the team slips through the pass.
72	"The Fortress"	Robert V. Barron	Steve Kramer
During their mountain trek, the team discovers an Invid fortress. Rand and Annie are captured during a reconnaissance of the place, which forces the rest of the team to break them out and destroy the base. Along the way, they witness an Invid transmutation and encounter a Living Computer ("Brain").
73	"Sandstorm"	Robert V. Barron	Steve Kramer
A desert sandstorm forces the team to lie low and wait for the storm to subside. Seeing as the woman found near Point K, Marlene, is ill, Rand tries to find cacti to extract water from and give to her. However, he falls into a cavern and inhales the Flower of Life spores. A subsequent dream gives him insights into the Invid's goals behind conquering Earth. (This episode is a clip show presented as a long dream sequence.)
74	"Annie's Wedding"	Robert V. Barron	Steve Kramer
Scott's team stumble into a garden protected by primitive warriors who venerate the Invid. Annie is smitten by one of the tribesmen, named Macgruder, and wants to marry him. Accused of offending the tribe's ancient river gods, Scott and his squad are forced to play both sides against each other if they hope to survive. The tribe's attitude toward the team changes after they save Annie and Macgruder from an Invid attack, eventually helping them build rafts to carry the mecha through the river. Annie is left behind to let her live with Macgruder, which saddens the team.
75	"Separate Ways"	Robert V. Barron	Steve Kramer
A late-night supply search into an abandoned city triggers an encounter with the Invid, where the team is trapped in an underground train station. The tension takes its toll on the team, as Rand, Rook, and Lunk actually consider breaking away. The team's unity is rebuilt after they work to break out of the station. Annie, who has been disgusted with the way of life in Macgruder's tribe, appears to rejoin the team.
76	"Metamorphosis"	Robert V. Barron	Steve Kramer
Disappointed with the lack of communications with Ariel/Marlene, the Invid Regess creates two new humanoids, a man named Corg and a woman named Sera, to lead the Invid forces. She orders them to find Ariel and reestablish contact. Meanwhile, the team finds an old Southern Cross naval base where they acquire fresh supplies and three patrol boats that they can use to reach North America. After Rook is wounded in a patrol, the team rests at a nearby island resort. Lancer heads off for a private swim, where he encounters Sera, who returns to her special Invid command mech. The team sets sail while under attack from the Invid. Lancer turns over his Beta fighter to Scott and rushes to Lunk's aid aboard one of the ships after he is hit. Sera swoops in for the kill, but freezes upon seeing Lancer on the bridge. The distraction buys time for the group to head out to sea.
77	"The Midnight Sun"	Robert V. Barron	Steve Kramer
Several months after the events of Metamorphosis, the team is attacked at their mountain camp, with Sera leading the assault. However, she freezes again upon seeing Lancer and Ariel/Marlene, allowing the rest of the team to fight off the Invid attack. Lancer and Ariel are at a loss as to why Sera would not attack when he is around.
78	"Ghost Town"	Robert V. Barron	Steve Kramer
While trekking across a desert, the team discovers a group of old soldiers who were part of an REF support mission that returned prior to the Invid invasion. One of the veterans admits receiving alert messages from the REF about a major offensive. The team decides to attack a nearby Invid communications tower and see the veterans themselves try one last act of heroism.
79	"Frostbite"	Robert V. Barron	Steve Kramer
Scott's team stumbles upon an old subterranean city in the Rocky Mountains (revealed to be Denver, Colorado) while trying to avoid Invid patrols. With the power still on, the team branches off to find fresh supplies and experience civilization once more. Scott accompanies Marlene, who reminds him of his namesake fiancee, but their moment is disrupted when Corg finds the team and attacks. The group evacuates the city, which Lunk has rigged to self-destruct by overloading its geothermal plant. Corg survives the blast but Scott is suspicious of how Marlene felt he was in the neighborhood.
80	"Birthday Blues"	Robert V. Barron	Steve Kramer
The team hides in an abandoned town after getting close to an Invid hive. They also pull off a surprise birthday party for Annie. Corg and the Invid try to crash the party, but the team wards them off with a fireworks display the Invid think are special missiles.
81	"Hired Gun"	Robert V. Barron	Steve Kramer
The team visit a town where the townsfolk are scared of a man named Dusty Ayres, a serial killer who hunts and murders army personnel in cold blood. Rand and Rook run into an Invid patrol but are helped out by a man with prosthetic attachments. A check with the town residents confirm that the man is Dusty Ayres. Rook learns that all of Ayres' victims were his friends, whom he claims left him to be experimented on by the Invid. When the team is attacked again by the Invid, Ayres sacrifices his life to save them, but not before killing the remaining men on his hit list.
82	"The Big Apple"	Robert V. Barron	Steve Kramer
The team reaches New York City and steals Protoculture from a storage facility at Carnegie Hall. Lancer, Annie, and Rand are helped in their heist by a young boy who brings them to a performing arts troupe led by one of Lancer's old friends. Meanwhile, at a hive somewhere in the city, Corg and Sera argue over the Regis' plans for the humans, with Corg deciding to commit genocide - starting in New York. The team springs into action as Lancer performs once more as Yellow Dancer to boost morale with his friend's troupe as backup. Scott, Rand, Rook and Lancer work together to destroy the hive. Sera confronts Marlene over her actions with the rebels.
83	"Reflex Point"	Robert V. Barron	Steve Kramer
Just a few miles away from Reflex Point, the team discovers an REF ship that has crashed after an Invid attack. While sifting through the wreckage, they stumble upon Sue Graham, a member of the REF Jupiter Division who is recording footage of the Invid's movements for further study by Admiral Hunter. While in hiding, Sue briefs the team about the REF fleet mobilizing near Moon Base ALUCE and their new Shadow fighters. The Invid attack again, providing her a chance to capture more footage, but dies after an encounter with an unnamed humanoid Invid wounded in the attack. As they see his dying form bleeding green blood, the team is also shocked to see green blood dripping from a cut on Marlene, who runs off.
84	"Dark Finale"	Robert V. Barron	Steve Kramer
The REF fleet heads toward Earth while waiting for Admiral Hunter to arrive in the SDF-3. Having linked up with the rest of the REF ground forces, Scott, Lancer, and Lunk join in the assault on Reflex Point, but Annie, Rand, and Rook refuse to be left behind. Seeing the carnage begin, Marlene accepts her identity as Ariel and turns into spirit form to lead the team inside the Reflex Point hive and confront the Regis. Sera also joins them, having saved Lancer from crashing. As their exchange continues, the Regess displays images of the REF fleet heading toward Earth. Scott also chases Corg.
85	"Symphony of Light"	Robert V. Barron	Steve Kramer
Aided by the Shadow fighters' Protoculture-cloaking capabilities, the REF presses the attack on Invid forces at Reflex Point and out in space. Scott kills Corg after a brutal dogfight. With the Invid putting on a tough fight and the SDF-3 still nowhere to be found, REF commander General Reinhardt orders the launch of the Neutron-S missiles to destroy all Invid even if it means the Earth is scorched in the process. Alarmed at this new development, the Regis has a change of heart and calls on all Invid to rally behind her and leave the planet in peace. Later, at Yellow Dancer's final concert, Scott bids Marlene goodbye as he flies out to find Admiral Hunter.

== Bibliography ==
- Robotech Art I: The Official Guide to the Robotech Universe by Kay Reynolds and Ardith Carlton. The Donning Company, 1986.
