= Maid Lena =

Danish folktale about swan maidens

Maid Lena (Danish: Jomfru Lene af Søndervand; German: Jungfer Lene von Söndervand; English: "Maiden Lene from Sondervand") is a Danish folktale collected by author Svend Grundtvig. It features versions of the swan maiden, a mythic female character that alternates between human and animal shapes.

The story is classified in the international Aarne-Thompson-Uther Index as tale type ATU 400, "The Man on a Quest for the Lost Wife", in a form of the narrative that, according to scholars, appears in Northern Europe, namely, in Scandinavia and in the Baltic Sea.

== Translations ==
The tale was alternatively translated into English as Maid Lena and as The Lass of Söndervand, in Danish Fairy Tales.

== Summary ==
A farmer has three sons: Poul, Peder and Esben, who is considered a fool for spending his days near the fireplace playing in the ashes (thus earning the name Esben Ashenfiest or Askefis; Esben-Ash-rake in Stith Thompson's translation). The family plants wheat in a meadow, but on St. John's Night, they find the fields are completely trampled. This goes on for the next year, and they decide to plant flax and to keep watch on their fields for three nights: Poul and Peder fail in their vigil, but Esben Askefis keeps watch on the third night. Esben finds three white swans coming to the fields, turning into human maidens by their feather cloaks, wings and gossamer veils, and dancing in the meadow. While they are distracted with the dance, Esben steals their clothes. The maidens then try to find their garments and see Esben, begging him to return their clothes, but Esben asks each of them to be his wife. The first two decline, but the third, named Lene, agrees to be his wife, and gives him her ring as a token. She also reveals that Lene and her sisters are princesses, cursed by a witch, and used to live in castle where the field is now located. For their wedding, Esben must build a castle in that same place, and Lene teaches him a spell he can use on a rock. Lene and the others depart. Esben knocks on a rock with a twig, chants the spell, and finds money, gold and ornaments under the rock. He hires carpenters and masons to build him a castle, which is concluded on Walpurgis Night.

Esben invites the whole village to the wedding, but the king invites himself. On the eve of the summer solstice, Esben waits at the castle doors and sees the swans flying towards him. Then a magnificent carriage appears, carrying Lene. Esben goes to greet her, but she notices the king's presence and warns Esben the king desires her. She then tells Esben to find her in her own castle, located "south of the sun, west of the moon and in the middle of the world", and departs. Thus, Esben begins his journey toward the distant castle. On the road, he meets three pairs of goblins fighting over magical objects: a hat of invisibility, seven-league boots, and a Swiss knife that can both revive the dead and kill people. Esben steals the objects for himself.

Later, he finds the huts of three old women: the first rules over the animals of the forest, the second all the fish in the sea and the third all the birds of the air. The first and the second old women summon all her subjects to ask for the location of the castle, but none of the animals of both forest and sea know. In the third woman's home, in Vogelberg ('Bird Mountain'), an old eagle comes late and announces it has come from that exact place, and offers to take Esben there. After a long journey, Esben finally reaches Lene's castle. He sees a maidservant and asks for a cup of wine. The servant brings him a cup, he puts Lene's ring inside and the servant takes the cup back to her mistress. Lene recognizes the ring and rushes to Esben to hug him, but fears for his safety, since a witch lives in the castle and may turn him to stone with but a glare. Esben put on the invisibility hat, enter the witch's quarters and kills her with the Swiss knife. Now free at last, Lene and Esben marry.

== Analysis ==
=== Tale type ===
The tale is classified in the international Aarne-Thompson-Uther Index as type ATU 400, "The Man on a Quest for the Lost Wife": the hero finds a maiden of supernatural origin (e.g., the swan maiden) or rescues a princess from an enchantment; either way, he marries her, but she disappears to another place. He goes after her on a long quest, often helped by the elements (Sun, Moon and Wind) or by the rulers of animals of the land, sea and air (often in the shape of old men and old women).

The middle episode of the hero acquiring magic objects that help in his journey is classified as tale type ATU 518, "Men Fight Over Magic Objects": hero tricks or buys magic items from quarreling men (or giants, trolls, etc.). Despite its own catalogation, folklorists Stith Thompson and Hans-Jörg Uther argue that this narrative does not exist as an independent tale type, and usually appears in combination with other tale types, especially ATU 400.

=== Motifs ===
Romanian folklorist Marcu Beza recognized an alternate opening to swan maiden tales: seven white birds steal the golden apples from a tree in the king's garden (an episode similar to German The Golden Bird), or, alternatively, they come and trample the fields. Researcher Barbara Fass Leavy noted a variation of the first opening episode which occurs in Scandinavian tales: a man's third or only son stands guard on his father's fields at night to discover what has been trampling his father's fields, and sees three maidens dancing in a meadow.

Similarly, Swedish scholar Waldemar Liungmann also noted that the motif of keeping watch over the fields at night is a "typical development" of Swedish, Nordic and Baltic Sea variants of the story he termed Das Märchen von der Schwanenjungfrau (lit. 'The Fairy Tale of the Swan Maiden').

== Variants ==
=== Den nedtraadte Ager ===
Danish historian Christian Molbech collected another Danish variant titled Den nedtraadte Ager (lit. 'The Untrod Field'). In this tale, a farmer has three sons, the two elders help in the fields, while the youngest, Esben, is of a quiet demeanor. The farmer sows all his fields, except one that is always destroyed on Saint John's Eve. The farmer's elder sons promise to keep watch on their fields for the next years, the elder in the first year and the middle son in the second. The elder sits on a rock near an old tree. He falls asleep, but at midnight he hears a thundering roar, and rushes home. His younger brother also fails in the same manner.

When it is Esben's turn in the third year, he sees three flying women coming to the field, taking off their pairs of wings and dancing on the field. Esben sees the beautiful maidens and hides their wings under the rock. The maidens finish dancing and look for the wings. Esben promises to return them, if one of them stays with him and becomes his wife. The maidens try to bargain for the wings with a hidden stash of money under the rock, which Esben accepts, but still wants to marry one of them. The first maiden explains she is a princess and the other her servants, and they lived on castle that stood on that meadow; a witch took them to a land where they never grow old; the witch gives her wings to fly to their former home, but they need the wings back. Esben repeats his proposal and the princess accepts, promising to return in three months, but she warns him not to invite the local king's son. Then they depart.

Esben shows his brothers the money. They become rich and prepare the upcoming wedding. Three months pass, and Esben awaits for his bride: a magnificent carriage brings her. He goes to greet her, and mentions that the king's son is also present. The princess hesitates to join the festivities, and asks him to find her "south of the sun, east of the moon and westward to all the winds", then rides off. Esben begins a quest for her. On the road, he finds two pairs of men fighting over magical objects: a pair of old shoes that walk miles and a knife that opens doors. Esben buys the items and reaches a Glass Mountain. He points the knife to a door and opens it; inside, a troll, whom he asks for directions. The troll summons the animals that creep near the ground, but none know of it. Esben meets the troll's brother, one the ruler of the fishes and animals of the sea, and the other the ruler of the birds. The third troll summons all birds, but the eagle comes late, since it was flying close to the castle south of the sun, east of the moon and westward to all the winds. The eagle promises to carry him there, but make a deal with Esben: the eagle will get its wings back, or Esben's life. The eagle carries Esben over to the castle. Once there, the youth asks a servant for a cup of water to drink and drops her ring in it. The princess and her servants meet Esben by the fountain, but Esben explains his deal with the eagle. The princess agrees to give the bird its wings; the eagle flies down, catches the wings on its beak and flies away. Esben and the princess marry at last.

=== Det forgyldte Taarn ===
Folklorist Evald Tang Kristensen collected a Danish variant titled Det forgyldte Taarn ved Verdens Ende (lit. 'The Golden Tower at the End of the World'). In this tale, a farmer has a wheat field that is trampled every year, on midsummer's night. He orders his three sons, Per, Povl, and Hans to keep watch on the fields. Hans is considered a fool, because he sleeps by the oven. At any rate, Per and Povl are the one to watch first, but abandon their vigil as soon as they hear a loud whistling. When it is his turn, Hans sees three flying maidens coming to the field, taking off their wings and dancing on the field. Hans steals their wings; they beg for them back, but Hans proposes one of them becomes his bride. One of the maidens agrees to be his wife, as long as he prepares everything for their wedding in two months' time, however he may not to invite the king's son. They depart; Hans finds a hidden cache of money under a rock.

Everything is prepared for the wedding and the maiden comes in a carriage. When she sees the king's son, she decides to postpone her wedding, and tells Hans to seek her in "The Golden Tower at the End of the World". Before she departs, the princess gives Hans three tablecloths: one can produce food, the other can build a castle for him to stay the night in a richly furnished bedroom, and the third can create a land bridge with trees and animals for him to cross the sea. The rides back to the Golden Tower, and Hans goes to seek her.

He stops by an old woman's cottage and gives her a better meal with the princess's tablecloth. In return, she gives him her dead husband's pair of mile-walking shoes and a sword that dissolves anything it touches, and directs him to a troll that may help him. With the shoes, he reaches a Glass Mountain and uses the sword to create an entrance. A troll greets him and, since he rules over the crawling creatures of the earth, he summons them, but none seem to know of the Golden Tower. The troll directs Hans to his troll brother, who rules over the animals that walk the earth, whose subjects also don't know, and to another troll brother that rules over the birds. A bird arrives late and knows the way to the Golden Tower. The bird carries him there. Hans drops her ring on a drink, the princess recognizes it and takes him with her sisters. Despite the joyous reunion, the princess fears for his life, since a dragon will come to the castle. Hans decides to face the dragon when he comes at midnight and kills it. The princess and Hans marry at last, then visit the old woman and present her with the magical tablecloths, and finally go to Hans's father's farmstead.

=== De tre Svanejomfruer ===
In a Danish tale published by folklorist Hans Ellekilde with the title De tre Svanejomfruer (lit. 'The Three Swan Maidens'), a man sows peas in his fields, but they are trampled every year on midsummer's night. Thus, he orders his three sons, Per, Povl, and Hans, to stand guard on their fields at night. They build a small hut near the fields to better accommodate them. The first time, Per tries to stay awake, but falls asleep and fails in the task. The next year, Povl tries his luck, and fails, like his elder brother. In the third year, Hans offers to watch the fields himself, despite his brothers' mockery, and discovers the culprit: three maidens in snow-white swan garments fly in and leave their flying robes on the opening below the roof, then dance on the fields. Hans takes the garments with him to the hut. After the girls dance, Hans confronts them for trampling his father's fields, and the maidens begs to be returned the garments, in exchange for Hans choosing one of them as his bride. Hans agrees and chooses the youngest one. She promises to return within a year, and tells Hans to prepare their wedding with the pots of gold hidden under three stones in the field. Before she leaves, she tells him he must not invite the king to the wedding, for the maidens are under the magic power of a witch that razed their castle, once located in their fields. She then says he must remain faithful to her, and leaves.

Hans tells his father and elder brothers about the events, and, to confirm his tale, guides them to the hidden stash of gold under the stones. Thus, Hans's father prepares his son's wedding. With the ruckus in town, the king notices the man is coming and going, and learns of the upcoming wedding, to which Hans's father invites him. After another year, the wedding reception is ready, and the swan maidens arrive. When the king, who is also attending the occasion, sights the swan girl, Hans's bride, he declares she must be with him, not Hans. For this, Hans's bride calls him and says he betrayed them, and she and her sisters are under the witch's thrall. Hans suggests he can reach the castle and defeat the witch, but his bride tells him she lives in the Castle Silammen, located south of the Sun, east of the Moon, and on the other side of the ocean, and one must make a long journey there. Hans says he can reach the castle, and she gives him her ring, which, if he brings with him to Castle Silammen, can break the witch's spell and liberate her and her sisters. With this, she departs. Hans decides to search for Castle Silammen and takes the road. On his journey, he meets two old men quarreling about a pair of magic boots that can walk a person a mile if its wearer utters that "A step is a mile, a mile is a step". Hans tricks the duo and absconds with the boots.

Later, he finds two men fighting over a rusty rifle. After learning the rifle is magic and can immobilize its target by simply aiming at them, Hans tricks the men and flees with the rifle. Then, in another part of his journey, he ventures into a deep forest and passes by three houses: one that belongs to the ruler of all animals, then by the one where the lord of all fishes live, and finally by the house of the ruler of all birds. Hans is welcomed by the respective lord's wife and threatens them to provide information about Castle Silammen: the lord of the animals and the ruler of the fishes summon all of his subjects, but no one knows its location. He is guided to the house of the lord of the birds, where he asks the same question to all the birds. All the small and large birds arrive and yet no one knows, save a great vulture that lives by the sea and arrives last. The lord of the birds orders the vulture to carry Hans to the Castle Silammen. Hans takes some meat as provisions for the journey, and feeds the vulture while they are on the aerial travel. Hans arrives at Castle Silammen and enters it, meeting his bride, who does not seem to recognize him. He tries to jog her memory by telling her how they met and about the journey he made, but she cannot recall anything. Suddenly, Hans remembers her ring, and drops it in a wine cup. The girl recognizes the ring and, remembering everything, kisses Hans, breaking the spell over the castle and over herself and her sisters. Hans and the swan maiden marry, and live in the Castle Silammen, south of the Sun, east of the Moon, and on the other side of the ocean.

== See also ==
- Askeladden
- The Three Princesses of Whiteland
- Soria Moria Castle
- The Blue Mountains
- The King of the Gold Mountain
- The Beautiful Palace East of the Sun and North of the Earth
