= Hind Horn =

Traditional song

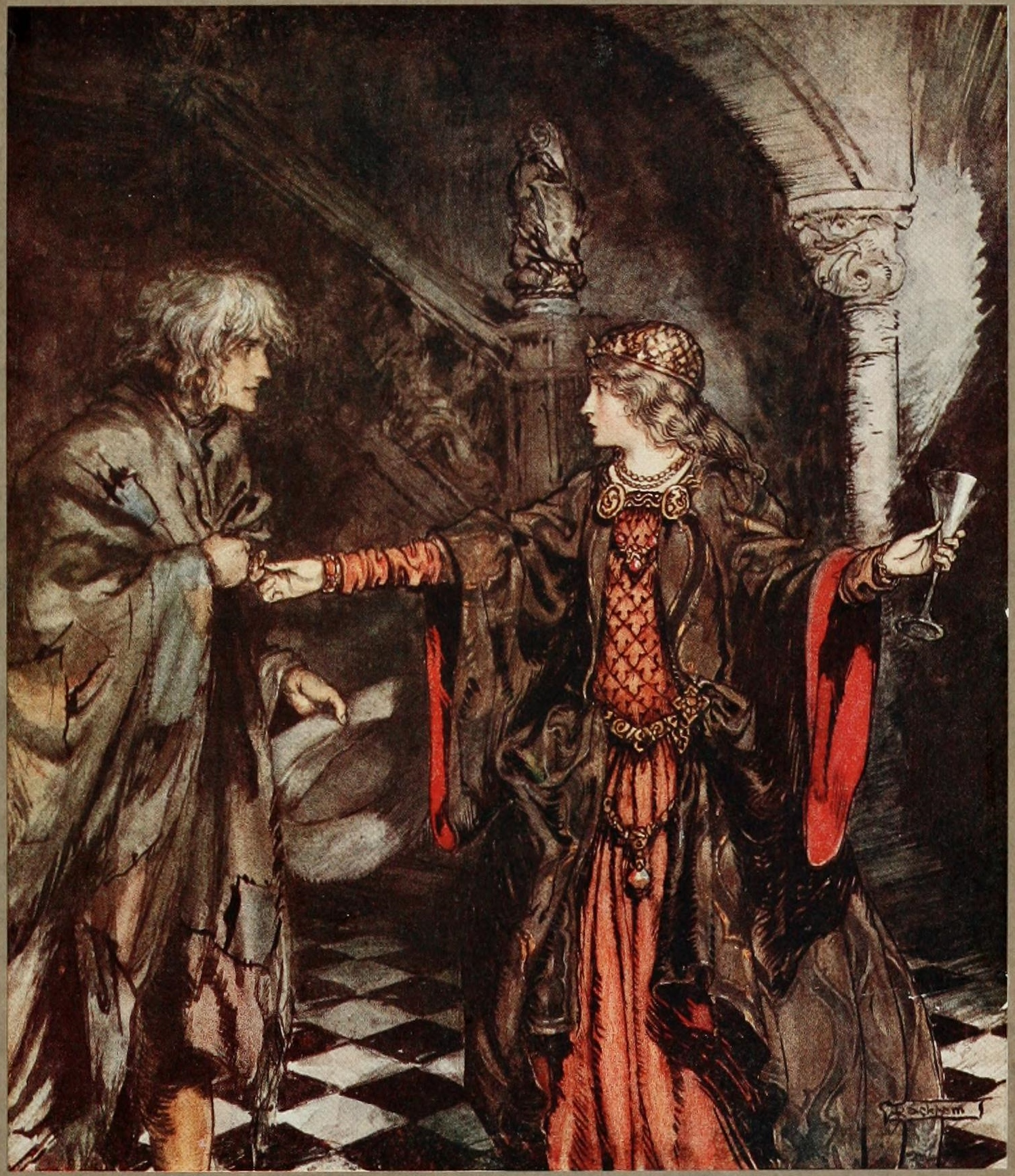
Illustration of a scene from "Hind Horn" by Arthur Rackham

"Hind Horn" (Child 17, Roud 28) is a traditional English and Scottish folk ballad.

== Synopsis ==
Hind Horn and the king's daughter Jean fall in love. He gives her a silver wand, and she gives him a diamond ring and tells him when the stones grow pale, he has lost her love. One day, on his travels, he sees it growing pale and sets out for her father's castle. A beggar tells him that the king's daughter is going to marry, and he persuades him to trade clothing. Hind Horn gets to the castle and begs a cup of wine; when the king's daughter gives it to him, he drops the ring in. She asks where he got it, and he told her she gave it to him. She declares she will throw off her fine clothing and beg with him from town to town, and he tells her that his clothing is only a disguise, she will be a great lady.

It was tradition at the time that any beggar who came to the back door of a house to beg from the bride on a wedding day would receive whatever reasonable thing he asked for.

== Variants ==
The popular ballad contains little more than the climax of a tale that is told at much greater length in several manuscripts: the English "King Horn", the latest parts of which are thirteenth century; the French romance, Horn et Rymenhild; and the fourteenth-century "Horn Childe and Maiden Rimnild", also English, but closer to the French version.

It appears to contain a stanza from "The Whummil Bore".

Several Swedish variants are known, including "Herr Lagman och Herr Thor", from the sixteenth century.

The hero's absence, return, disguised arrival at the wedding feast, and recognition by dropping a ring into the bride's wine cup is a common motif found in both ballads and fairy tales, such as Soria Moria Castle and The Raven.

The magic ring is also found, with the same properties, in the ballad "Bonny Bee Hom".

The ballad was published by William Motherwell in his Minstrelsy: Ancient and Modern (Glasgow, 1827). It was collected in US, South England, Scotland, and Canada.

== Recording ==
This can be found on Bandoggs (now unobtainable) eponymous LP, and Maddy Prior's 1998 CD Flesh & Blood and 1999 live Ballads & Candles.

An adapted version can be found on Lissa Schneckenburger's 2008 album Song entitled The Old Beggar Man.

== See also ==
- Bonny Bee Hom
- List of the Child Ballads
- The Kitchie-Boy
- Young Beichan
