= Bonny Bee Hom =

Traditional song

Bonny Bee Hom (Roud 3885, Child 92) is an English-language folk song.

== Synopsis ==
A lady laments that her love had left her. He, still there, comes to comfort her but tells her that he is sworn to leave. She gives him a ring: while he wears it, he will shed no blood, but if he sees the stone fade, he will know she is dead. He is departed for "twelve month and a day" before the stone fades. He gives all his goods as alms to his hometown, and dies, uniting with the lady's soul in heaven.

== Motifs ==
The magic ring is found also in the ballad "Hind Horn".
