= The Beautiful Palace East of the Sun and North of the Earth =

Swedish folktale

The Beautiful Palace East of the Sun and North of the Earth (Swedish: Det sköna Slottet östan om Solen och nordan om Jorden; German: Das schöne Schloß, östlich von der Sonne, nördlich von der Erde) is a Swedish folktale collected from Småland by Swedish folktale collectors George Stephens and Gunnar Olof Hyltén-Cavallius. It features versions of the swan maiden, a mythic female character that alternates between human and animal shapes.

The story is classified in the international Aarne-Thompson-Uther Index as tale type ATU 400, "The Man on a Quest for the Lost Wife", in a form of the narrative that, according to scholars, appears in Northern Europe, namely, in Scandinavia and the Baltic Sea.

== Translations ==
The tale was translated to English as The Beautiful Palace East of the Sun and North of the Earth by Benjamin Thorpe and as East of the Sun and North of the Earth.

== Summary ==
A man dwells in a forest near a rich green meadow. In summer mornings, the grass somehow is treaded all over. He orders his three sons to stand guard near the meadow. The elder two fail on their vigils, because they fall asleep through the whole night. When it is the youngest's turn, near "the hour of the matins", he sees three doves coming to the meadows, take off their plumages and become human maidens.

As the girls dance around meadow, the youth takes notice of one of them and intends to have her for himself. He also seizes the opportunity to hide their plumages. As the sun rises, the maidens prepare to depart in bird form, but cannot find their featherskins. They search for them, and sees the youth standing there. They beg him to return their feathers. The youth agrees to their pleading, but first he wants some explanations: one of the girls says they are a princess and two court attendants that live in a palace east of the sun and north of the earth. The youth also asks the princess to become his bride, and to set a date to their marriage. The princess agrees and they promise to remain faithful until their wedding, then departs with her court attendants.

The youth goes home to his father and tells nothing of his nightly adventure. Time passes, and the wedding date approaches. The youth asks his father to prepare a wedding feast for him and invite all of their relatives. By midnight, a luxurious carriage comes to the feast, bringing the princess and her court attendants. The youth introduces her as his intended bride and explains the night adventure at the meadow.

Happiness abound between the couple, but it is short-lived: just before sunrise, the princess tells her bridegroom she must depart, since a Troll killed her father, the true king of the palace east of the sun and north of the earth, and she can only enjoy some hours of freedom around midnight, having to go back before sunrise. The youth understands the urgency of the situation. The princess gives him her golden ring, her court attendants a golden ball, and rushes to leave her wedding feast.

After some days, the youth decides to go after her, and says goodbye to his father. He begins his long quest, searching meadows, valleys and kingdoms for his wife's palace. One day, he finds two giants fighting over their father's inheritance: a pair of magical boots that allow its wearer to take a hundred miles with every step. The youth convinces the giants to part with the boots to settle their little dispute.

The youth reaches another forest, where he finds another pair of giants fighting over a cloak of invisibility. The youth also convinces them to give him the cloak to settle their quarrel. Lastly, he finds yet another duo of giants fighting over a sword that kills on its point and revives with its hilt. He also wins the sword.

On the next stop of his journey, he traverses a vast desert, and sees a light in the distance, coming from a little cot. A "very very old old" woman takes him in and gives him shelter for the night. The next morning, the old woman summons all "beasts of the field" to consult with them if anyone knows the location of the palace. None know it, and the youth departs.

He arrives at another vast desert, with a little cot in the distance that belongs to an ever older woman, ruler of the fishes in the sea. He stays the night and the next morning the old woman summons all fishes. None know where the palace east of the sun and north of the earth is. The old woman bids him consult with her eldest sister, who rules the fowls in the air.

Lastly, the youth reaches a third vast desert, with a small cot on a mountain. The youth greets the eldest sister and explains the motive of his journey. The next morning, the eldest woman summons all her subjects to consult with them. After a while, she notices the phoenix is not among them. The phoenix arrives soon after and tells his lateness is due to him coming from the palace east of the sun and north of the earth. The eldest woman then proclaims the phoenix's punishment is to take the youth to the palace.

The phoenix carries the youth on its back. Long is their journey: at first, the youth can only see a blue cloud in the horizon; then, a speck of glitter in the blue cloud, and finally, a gleaming palace in gold and silver. The phoenix leaves the youth there and flies back to its ruler. At midnight, all trolls having fallen asleep, the youth knocks on the castle doors. The princess sends her court attendants to see who is their visitor. The attendants open the door and see it is their princess's husband. To confirm his identity, he returns them the golden apples they gave him.

The princess does not believe it at first, so goes to check herself. The youth gives her the golden ring, confirming he is her bridegroom. They spend the whole night conversing with each other, but, come morning, the princess fears for her beloved's safety, since the trolls will awake. The youth decides to stay and, with the aid of the magical boots, the cloak and the sword, stakes out near the palace gates and kills each and every troll with the sword.

Later in the day, the court attendants report to the princess her bridegroom's success. The princess is overjoyed, but claims her happiness will be even greater if her relatives are alive. The youth goes to the room where her relatives' bodies are laid, and revives them with the sword. The princess's family wakes and thanks the youth for reviving them, and enthrones the princess and her bridegroom as their king and queen.

== Analysis ==
=== Tale type ===
The tale is classified in the international Aarne-Thompson-Uther Index as type ATU 400, "The Man on a Quest for the Lost Wife": the hero finds a maiden of supernatural origin (e.g., the swan maiden) or rescues a princess from an enchantment; either way, he marries her, but she disappears to another place. He goes after her on a long quest, often helped by the elements (Sun, Moon and Wind) or by the rulers of animals of the land, sea and air (often in the shape of old men and old women).

The middle episode of the hero acquiring magic objects that help in his journey is classified as tale type ATU 518, "Men Fight Over Magic Objects": hero tricks or buys magic items from quarreling men (or giants, trolls, etc.). Despite its own catalogation, folklorists Stith Thompson and Hans-Jörg Uther argue that this narrative does not exist as an independent tale type, and usually appears in combination with other tale types, especially ATU 400.

=== Motifs ===
Romanian folklorist Marcu Beza recognized an alternate opening to swan maiden tales: seven white birds steal the golden apples from a tree in the king's garden (an episode similar to German The Golden Bird), or, alternatively, they come and trample the fields. Researcher Barbara Fass Leavy noted a variation of the first opening episode which occurs in Scandinavian tales: a man's third or only son stands guard on his father's fields at night to discover what has been trampling his father's fields, and sees three maidens dancing in a meadow.

Similarly, Swedish scholar Waldemar Liungmann also noted that the motif of keeping watch over the fields at night is a "typical development" of Swedish, Nordic and Baltic Sea variants of the story he termed Das Märchen von der Schwanenjungfrau ("The Fairy Tale of the Swan Maiden").

== Variants ==
=== Scandinavia ===
==== Sweden ====
Finnish folklorist Oskar Hackman summarized some Finnish-Swedish variants in his publication Finlands svenska folkdiktning under the banner Konungariket Midnattssol ("The Kingdom of the Midnight Sun").

In a tale sourced from Karleby, a dead father appears to his sons and orders them to keep watch over their fields for three nights. The two elder brothers fail due to bad weather. Despite the heavy rain, the third son keeps watch and sees three witches flying to the fields, taking off their wings and dancing on the fields. Two of the witches are long-nosed, but the third is a beautiful maiden. The third son hides the third witch's wings. When morning comes, the two long-nosed witches wear their wings and fly back, while their companion remains there. The youth promises to return her wings if she promises to be his wife. The maiden does agree to his proposal, but offers a counterproposal: she will be his wife if he goes after her in her palace, and gives him her ring as a token. The maiden departs to her castle, and the youth begins his journey. On the road, he finds three cottages where he obtains three magic objects: a pair of seven league boots, an invisibility hat and a magical harp. The youth then meets two witch ferrywomen (the same witches that flew to his fields) that can take him across the sea to an island. The youth gives the first witch the harp as payment for the crossing, and uses the invisibility hat to secretly jump on the second witch's boat. He reaches the maiden's castle and sees a servant fetching water. He drops the maiden's ring into the jar, which is brought to her. The maiden sees her ring and notices her beloved must be nearby, and bids him come out of hiding. The youth appears, kisses her and breaks the spell on the castle.

In a tale sourced from Vörå, on midsummer's night, a farmer's fields are being trampled by something, so the farmer orders his sons to keep watch. The elder sons fall asleep on their turns, while the youngest son stays awake. He sees three geese coming to trample the fields and shoots at them, injuring one of the birds. The geese turn into human maidens and flee, expect for the injured one. The youth takes the girl to his home and nurses her back to health. They marry. One day, the maiden begins to miss her home, the castle of kingdom of the Midnight Sun, despite her husband's pleas. She still flies back there, but cracks her ring in two and gives half to him as a token. The youth then begins his journey. He finds a dragon guarding a castle, and shoots him. He knocks on the castle doors and a young woman appears to him. She is the ruler of all the birds of the air, and summons all birds to consult them about the location of the king of the Midnight Sun. An eagle comes late and agrees to carry the youth to the kingdom, since he's just come from there. After the journey, the youth meets his wife and stays with her.

In a tale collected by G. A. Åberg from Strömfors with the dialectal title Om Lísa som bódd norr undi sólən o sydər undi jórdan, a farmer orders his three sons to keep vigil on their fields during the midsummer's nights, since something is coming to trample their fields. The first two fail because of bad weather. The third son ties his feet to a tree to avoid falling asleep and to be jerked awake by the summer storm. He then sees three princesses coming in featherskins to the fields. When they land, they take off their wings and dance on the grass. The youth hides their wings. After their dancing is over, the princesses beg for the featherskins back. He returns them to two of them, but withholds the youngest's, named Lisa, until she promises to marry him. Lisa gives him her ring as a token, then gets her wings and flies away to the land north of the sun and south of the earth. The youth begins his quest to find her land. On the road, he passes by an old woman's cottage and takes shelter there. The old woman complains to him that she does not seem to cook enough food for her giant husband. The youth helps her and her giant husband. In return, the giant carries the youth on his back up a mountain. The youth opens a hatch and climbs down; inside, he finds Lisa and drops her ring on a drink. Lisa recognizes the ring and warns him of her father. Lisa's father offers the youth a poisoned drink, but he drops the poison on the floor. As a last trick, the father tries to throw the human down a hole, but the youth takes out a sword and kills him. Lisa and the youth marry.

In a tale sourced from Nedervetil, a farmer orders his three sons to guard their fields. The elder sons fail due to bad weather. The youngest shelters himself from the storm and sees three flying girls coming to their fields. They take off their wings and dance in the meadow. The youth hides the wings of one of them and asks her to marry him. As a token of marriage, she gives him a golden ring, and promises to return at the appointed time for their marriage. It so happens: the youth marries the flying girl, but a local emperor begins to covet the flying girl and plans to get rid of the man. First, the emperor orders the man to cut down every oak tree in the forest and to rise them again (both done with his wife's advice), and finally to get a silver key from the palace of the emperor of the enchanted land. The flying girl advises her husband to steal the key at midnight, since the animal guardians of the castle are asleep at this hour. The man gets the key, but the animals begin to chase him. The lion pulls him over and he falls to the forest floor, while his horse rides back home with the key. Seeing that the task was accomplished, but the man apparently perished, he decides to marry the flying girl. They each go to church on their own carriages. She leaves her carriage, wears back the flying garments and flies back to her castle. Back to her husband, he survives the fall from his horse, begins a quest to find his wife. On the road, he steals a magic tablecloth from an old man, a pair of seven league boots and an invisibility hat. He discovers that he has to traverse the White Sea, the Black Sea and the Red Sea, by being ferried by three witches at the margin of every sea. The youth uses the magical tablecloth to provide food for the first two witches to wind them over, and kills the third witch's servant. Adrift at sea, he prays to God and a pike appears to carry him over through the last stop of the journey. Reaching the island's shores, the youth puts on the invisibility hat, creeps into the castle and places her ring on a water jug. The flying girl recognizes her ring, and bids her human husband appear to her. They embrace.

In another tale collected by G. A. Åberg from Strömfors with the dialectal title Vatngårsslot (Swedish: "Vattengårdsslottet"). In this tale, a father orders his three sons to keep watch on their fields. The elder two fail, but the youngest, despite the bad weather, discovers the coming of three bird-maidens that come to dance in the fields. The girls take off the flying garments, which the youth steals. After they dance, the girls beg for them back, and he returns to two of them. He chooses the third girl as his wife and she consents to be with him. They marry, but a local emperor covets the girl and orders the man to fulfill three tasks: to fell down a whole forest, then put it back, and steal the keys from an enchanted castle. The youth is pursued by the animals in the forest and falls off the horse, but his mount takes the keys with him. Seizing the opportunity, the emperor takes the bird-maiden to church, but she wears the flying garments, becomes a raven and flies back to her home, at Vattengårdsslottet. Her human husband returns home and discovers that his wife flew away, and goes after her. He passes by a cemetery, where two corpses are quarreling over a pair of magical boots that allows its wearer to take a large step, then another cemetery where another duo of dead men are fighting over a magical saber, and another person with an invisibility hat. He steals the items and reaches the hut of a long-nosed old woman who rules over the mammals. She summons the mammals, but none have any idea on how to get to Vattengårdsslottet. At any rate, the old woman ferries the youth across the sea and demands as payment his right hand. He cuts off her head with the saber. He then reaches the hut of the old woman that rules over the birds of the air. Once again, the birds do not know anything, but the old woman ferries across the sea and is met with the same fate. Finally, he reaches a third hut of an old woman that rules over the animals of the sea. A whale comes late and tells the youth it came from there. The whale offers to take him there, but the old woman tries to get his body parts as payment, and she is also killed. After the whale takes the youth there, he uses the invisibility hat to infiltrate his wife's castle and drops her ring in a water jug.

August Bondeson collected a Swedish tale titled Herregården, som var belägen öst om solen och väst om vinden i det förlovade landet ("The Castle East of the Sun and West of the Wind in the Promised Land "): a miller finds out that the grains at his mill are disappearing, since the mill is locked at night, and decides to investigate. He spies three pigeons come to the mill, take off their featherskins and become maidens. As the maidens steal some of the grains, the man creeps into the place the maidens hid their garments and steal a set of clothes. Two of the maidens wear back the clothes and fly away as pigeons, while the third maiden wonders where she left her clothes. The man appears to her and asks her to be his fiancée. She agrees, gains her clothes back, tells the man to seek her home: the mansion located east of the Sun, West of the wind in the promised land, and flies away. Time passes, and the man decides to seek this distant place. He enters a deep forest and meets an old woman in a cottage by the sea. The old woman rules over the fishes of the sea and consult with them the location of the titular mansion. Since neither she, nor her subjects know anything about it, she sends the man to another sister. The man reaches the cottage of the second sister, who rules over the animals of the land. She also calls her subjects, but none know anything about the mansion. The second old woman also sends the man to a third sister, who rules over the birds of the air. The man reaches the third cottage, and spends the night there. The next morning, the third sister summons the birds of the air. All but an old eagle come, so the sister whistles three times to summon the old eagle. The eagle says it has been to the titular land. The third sister, then, orders the eagle to take the man there. The bird takes the man to the titular location, but on the journey tries to drop the man three times, to teach him a lesson. The eagle finally arrives at the castle, which looks like more of a crystal mountain. The man opens up a crystal door and finds the three princesses, his fiancée included. The princess learns of the eagle's treatment of the man, but forgives it and dismisses it back to its mistress. The princess then reveals her fiancé must behead her to break her curse, as proof of trust. The man vehemently refuses to do so at first, but obeys her request. The crystal mountain is disenchanted and returns to its former shape. The man lives with the princess for a while, but begins to miss his parents. The princess allows him to return there for a visit, but warns him not to leave his horse. He rides back to his parents' house, who are surprised to see him in lavish clothes. The miller gives his father a bag of money, and his mother insists he comes in, and pushes him off the horse. The miller despairs at the fact that he may never return to his fiancée, and wanders off into the forest. However, the princess arrives with a carriage and takes him back to the castle. Once there, she announces they will marry in a fortnight.

==== Norway ====
Germanist Klara Stroebe published a Norwegian tale translated into English as Farther South Than South, and Farther North Than North, and in the Great Hill of Gold. In this tale, a peasant has a wheat-field that something has been trampling every Saturday night, so he orders his three sons to keep guard on the fields to discover the culprits. The elder sons fall asleep through the night watch, and fail. On the third night, John of the Ashes manages to stay awake and discovers three doves come, shake off their feathers and become maidens. As the girls trample and dance on the wheat field, John of the Ashes gathers their feathers. At sunrise, the girls look for their feathers, but cannot find them. John appears to them and asks for explanations: the girls reveal a troll sends them every Saturday night to trample the fields. John offers to help them break the curse, but the girls warn him of the many-headed trolls that await him at the castle. He chooses the middle girl as his bride, she gives him her ring as a memento, and departs with the others in bird form. John of the Ashes begins his quest. He finds two young men quarreling over a pair of seven leagues boots and a cane that kills people, later two other young men fighting over a fiddle that revives the dead, and steals their objects. He finally finds an old man that directs him to the castle "farther south than south, and farther north than north, and in the great hill of gold", but warns of the dangers that roam the castle. John of the Ashes reaches the castle and knocks on the door. The watchman warns him that he may go through the three rooms to meet the maidens, but the trolls will come at any moment. John makes light of the danger, and assures the watchmen he will win. He meets the maidens and assuages their fears. The first troll enters, a three-headed one. John uses the magic cane and kills him. He does the same to the second troll, with 7 heads. Lastly, the nine-headed troll comes into the room. John strikes 8 of his heads with the magic cane, but the troll kills the three maidens and flees the room. John chases after him and strikes the ninth head. He then enters the room, revives the maidens with the fiddle, carries them down the mountain and marries the middle maiden. According to Ørnulf Hodne's The Types of the Norwegian Folktale, the tale was originally collected in Vestfold with the title Sønna for sø og nora for nor, inde ved det store Guldberget.

==== Iceland ====
Philologist Adeline Rittershaus summarized an Icelandic tale first collected by Björn Bjarnason in his book Sagnakver. In this tale, translated into German as Die Burg östlich vom Mond und südlich von der Sonne ("The City east of the Moon and South of the Sun"), a royal couple celebrates the long awaited birth of their son. Royal astrologers predict that, when the prince is 20 years old, he will suffer the pains of love for the love of a woman, so his parents raise him in the castle away from the presence of women - even his mother has to dress in male clothes to protect him. However, this overprotectiveness does not help matters, for the boy is withdrawn and taciturn - his only joy: his beautiful garden. One day, the royal guards inform the prince something has been to the garden to steal the flowers. The prince, now a young man, decides to guard the garden himself. One night, he sees three swans coming and perching on a tree. The swans take off their plumages to become maidens, and climb down the tree with baskets to pick flowers. While the girls are distracted, the prince climbs up the tree and steals the largest swan cloak and hides it in a large box. The maidens returns and two of them turn back into swans and depart, while the third one remains behind because she cannot find her own cloak. The prince goes to her and tries to talk to her. The girl begs to have her swan cloak back, for she is the daughter of the King of the Clouds, who lives in a castle east of the Moon and South of the Sun. The prince insists she stays with him, for he wants to learn about the matters of the heart. He eventually marries the girl and lies to her that he burned her swan cloak. However, the girl suspects that is a lie, opens the large box and wears back the garment. The next morning, the princes notices his wife is missing, and tries to take his own life, but his mentor dissuades him, and suggests they begin a journey to the Cloud King's realm. They walk through the forest and find a long-bearded dwarf. The dwarf blows a whistle and summons all bird of the world to ask for directions, the eagle being late. None of the birds know of the location of the Cloud King's realm. The dwarf then summons the classical compass winds (north, south, west and east). None have any idea about its location. Finally, the dwarf summons the storms, the southeast gale coming late because he was there. The prince's mentor suggests the gale carries the prince in the Cloud King's carriage to his kingdom, and gives the prince an invisibility stone. The gale takes the prince to the Cloud King's realm, and the prince wanders through the castle. He finds his wife next to a fountain, a heap of unwashed clothes behind her. The girl is lamenting to herself the harsh treatment her sisters dispense her for having married a human. The prince reveals himself and comforts her by saying that, if her father knows that his son-in-law is a prince, he may accept their marriage. The prince uses the invisibility stone and accompanies his wife to her father's court. Inside the castle, her sisters mock her for marrying a human, and berate her for not washing the clothes. Her father also threatens to banish her from his kingdom for the same reason, but the prince appears to him. The Cloud King welcomes him as his son-in-law. At last, the prince and his wife are carried back by the gale to his father's kingdom. The tale was translated as The City East of the Moon and South of the Sun.

==== Faroe Islands ====
Faroese linguist Jakob Jakobsen published a Faroese tale titled Kongaríkið Verðsins Endi ("The Kingdom at the End of the World"). In this tale, a father has three sons. Something has been trampling the fields, so he orders his sons to keep watch for some nights. The elder two fail, but the youngest discovers three swan girls that come to the meadow, take off their plumages and dance on the fields. The youth hides the swan plumage of one of them and asks her to be his bride. The swan girl consents, but if he promises not to utter a curse during the wedding night. They marry and he utters a curse, causing his bride to disappear. The youth goes on a journey to find her castle, the kingdom at the end of the world. He consults with the winds of the directions and the North Wind takes him to the Glass Mountain where the kingdom is located. Once there, he helps the swan princess break a curse cast on them by a giantess.

==== Sami people ====
German lexicographer Jens Andreas Friis collected a Sámi folktale titled Baeive-Kongens Datter or Die Tochter des Beivekönigs ("The Daughter of the Beive-King"). In this tale, a farmer has three sons, the youngest called Gudnavirus (Askeladden, Ashlad, Male Cinderella) for he likes to play in the ashes of the fireplace. One day, the farmer notices their barn is being broken into and someone has been eating their grains, so he orders his sons to keep guard on the barn. The elder two stand guard first, each on each night, but they hear a great noise or roar and run back home. The third night, Gudnavirus keeps alert: he sees three white swans flying through the air. The birds alight near the grains, take off their featherskins and become maidens. Gudnavirus hides the youngest maiden's featherskin while she is distracted taking care of the grains. After their duty is over, two of the maidens wear back their featherskins and fly back as swans, but the youngest remains human. He begs for her plumage back: if a man or a woman, she will reward them handsomely; if an unmarried man, she promises to marry him. Gudnavirus comes out of hiding and makes her promise. As a proof of sincerity, she tells him she is the daughter of the Beive-King, and gives him her golden ring. The maiden gets the plumage back, but promises to return in 6 months. She fulfills her promise and comes in a flying ship to marry him. Gudnavirus agrees to marry her, but first he has to obtain the king's permission to do so. The Beive-King's daughter warns him against, but he goes anyway. The human king orders him first to fell all tree of the forest (Gudnavirus uses a magic axe given by his bride), then to plant them back (the youth does with the use of an ointment his bride gives him), and finally to get a golden lasso from the Kingdom of Darkness. The Beive-King's daughter berates him and disappears on her flying ship. Still intent on fulfilling the king's last task, Gudnavirus goes on a quest to the Kingdom of Darkness, first by following the sunlight until it fades, then the moonlight until is ceases, and finally the light of the stars. He enters the Kingdom of Darkness and finds the lasso. He makes his way back and sees two giants fighting over an invisibility hat, then another pair fighting over seven league boots, and a third duo over a magic baton that revives the living on one edge and kills on the other. Gudnavirus steals the magic objects and goes on his merry way. He also finds an old woman's hut, who summons all birds of the air to consult with. An old eagle comes late and is orders to fly all over the lands, all over the seas and finally all over the sky in search of the kingdom. The eagle locates it and flies back to report. The bird agrees to carry Gudnavirus there, but bids him takes with him three pebbles to create resting stops for it on the long journey there. The youth arrives at the Beive-King's realm and sees his bride walking towards a fountain with a boy and a pile of clothes. The boy asks the princess about his father, and sees his father (Gudnavirus)'s reflection in fountain. Later, the youth creeps into the princess's room, takes off his invisibility hat and appears to her. She embraces him and introduces him to her father. The Beive-King consents to marry him to his daughter, but first he has to resurrect the king's fallen soldiers. Gudnavirus uses the magic baton and fulfills the king's request. At last, he and the Beive-King's daughter marry and live happily.

In a Sámi tale collected by Norwegian scholar Just Qvigstad from a source in Lyngen and titled Det forgylte slott, and translated to English as The Gilded Castle, an old woman has three sons, the youngest named Askeladden ("Gudnabađǫš", in the original). The local king wants to hire someone to watch over his fields at night, whose crops are being destroyed every night. Askeladden is hired to the position, and, that same night, sees three birds alighting and taking off their wings, they proceeding to eat the crop. Askeladden steals the wings of the most beautiful of the three maidens, which she notices and promises to marry him if he returns them. The girl gets the wings back and promises to come to fetch him on a ship, and gives him half of her ring. Later, the girl comes on a ship, but the local king forbids Askeladden to depart, only allowing his voyage if the boy fulfills some tasks beforehand: first, to gather all stones on the fields; next, to stock them in piles; thirdly, to raze every tree in his land, then to plant them again; lastly, to steal back a silver box from the giants. With his bride's help Askeladden fulfills the first tasks, one after the other, but, on the last one, the girl says she cannot wait any longer, gives him a golden ring engraved with her name, and departs on her ship. Askeladden decides to take the box in the land of the giants: after traversing a long swamp, he reaches their farm, takes the box with him and makes his way back through the same swamp, but tumbles in the mud and lets the box fall in the mire. Defeated, he returns to the king's land and finds out his bride abandoned him. He wanders off until he reaches the house of an old woman, who is the mistress of the fishes. Askeladden asks for the location of the golden castle. The old woman does not know, so she sends him to her elder sister, who is the lady of the animals of the land. The second sister also does not know its location, so she sends Askeladden to her even elder sister, the ruler of the birds. The third sister summons all of her subjects, and the bird "griffel" knows about the golden castle and can take him there. The third old woman gives Askeladden three stones, which can use to create island as stops, and a cloth. The griffel begins an aerial journey to the golden castle, and Askeladden makes use of the stones. At last he reaches another shore, where he finds two people fighting over a cap of invisibility, which he steals, then another pair of people fighting over a cane that can kill and resurrect people, which he also steals. He finds his bride by a fountain and drops her ring inside a bucket, which she recognizes. Askeladden reveals himself and tells her how he arrived there. The girl then says her father is at war, and Askeladdan joins in the fray. He uses the cane to kill the enemies of his bride's father, and marries her.

=== Poland ===
Polish philologist and folklorist Julian Krzyżanowski, establisher of the Polish Folktale Catalogue according to the international index, identified a similar narrative in Poland, under tale type T 400, "Mąż szuka utraconej żony" ("Husband in search of his lost wife"). According to Krzyżanowski, he separated four independent, but related types in the Polish tale corpus, which he indicated by letters. In Polish subtype T 400B, "Ptaki w ogrodzie" ("The Bird in the Garden"), the hero spies on three bird maidens in a field or meadow, marries one of them, then goes after her when she disappears.

In a Polish tale from Masuria titled Złote gołębie ("Golden Pigeons"), collected by German historian Max Toeppen and translated as Die goldenen Tauben ("The golden doves"), a farmer has three sons, the youngest considered a fool. Every morning, the farmer notices that his golden field is trampled overnight by something or someone, and sends his sons to stand guard at night. The elder two fail on their respective vigils. When it is the youngest's turn, he sees three golden doves coming. The birds take off their birdskin, become a princess and two servants, and hang their garments in the bushes. He hides their dove feathers, while the girls are playing and dancing in the fields. When they return for their garments, the youth asks for something in return. The princess gives him a golden ring, and a servant a golden apple. The youth then asks the princess to marry him, and she agrees. They go to his parents' house and marry. The dove princess, however, tells him she must return to her castle, and her human husband wishes to go with him. The princess asks him to wait for a year, and search for her palace "where the sun sets, and there is winter", then flies back. After a year, the youth begins his quest. On the journey, he finds two giants fighting over a pair of seven-league boots, then another pair fighting over a cloak of invisibility, and finally a third pair fighting over a saber that revives the dead. The youth steals the three objects and soldiers on. He then reaches an old woman's hut and asks for shelter for the night. The next morning, the old woman summons all animals of the forest; the lion arrives late, and tells him where the princess's castle is. The lion offers to accompany the youth and protect him as he walks through the forest. In his next stop, the youth stops by another woman's hut and stays the night. The next day, she summons all birds of the air; the wren arrives late, and says it can take the youth to the princess's castle. After the aerial journey, the youth sees that the garden, the trees, the animals, everything is dead. He knocks on the door and calls for Ewe (Toeppen informs that it means the name Ewa). A servant opens the door and the youth gives her the golden apple. The servant shows the golden apple to her lady, the princess, who is very surprised to see him there. The princess lets him, but warns that there are many-headed demons in the first room, and even more in the second. The youth kills them with the sword. The princess then asks him to revive the dead king and queen in the third room, which he does when the touches the saber on their corpses.

In a Polish tale titled The Palace of Rainbow Fountains, a king has an orchard filled with beautiful trees and fruits. However, the gardeners notice that on three successive nights, the orchard has been invaded and trampled by three wild swans. The king's three sons, the first two bright and the youngest considered a fool, offer to hold a vigil to capture the birds. The first two try to stay awake at night, but fall asleep, and at midnight the three swans come to the orchard. When it is the youngest's turn, he remains awake by walking about and, when midnight strikes, the three swans come, take off their feathers and become human maidens. While the maidens occupy themselves with their dancing on the sward, the third prince steals the first feather cloak he sees. As their dance dies down, two of the maidens turn back into swans and fly away, leaving their companion to look for her lost garment. She sees the prince and begs him for the garments back, but the prince does not return them. He, however, covers her with a coat and let her tell her story: the girls are enchanted princesses who live in a kingdom of rainbow fountains which have dried, and they take flight to bathe in distant regions. The prince falls in love with the princess, and wishes to have her stay with him, but the girl says it cannot be so, and she must rejoin her sisters. However, he can meet her again in the Land of Rainbow Fountains, in their palace, and flies back to her kingdom. The next day, the king congratulates his youngest son for protecting his garden, but the prince wishes to begin a journey to find the swan princess. Despite his father's insistence, the prince takes his horse and rides in search of the Land the princess mentioned, but the way seems distant. On the road, he finds three giants quarreling about three magical objects: a pair of seven-league boots, a cloak of invisibility, and a feathered hat that produces a loud noise like the shooting of cannons. The prince tricks the giants and steals the objects for himself, then puts on the boots to jump ahead and advance in his quest. After some walking with the boots, he reaches a gloomy forest surrounded by marshlands, where the Mother of the Moon lives with his son, the Moon, in a hut. After the Moon comes down from the sky, he is asked about the location of the Land of the Rainbow Fountains, but tells the prince to keep walking, for he is still very far from there. He walks until he reaches the house of the Mother of the Sun, and finally the house of the Mother of the seven Winds. In the third house, seven of the Winds appear and are asked about the location of the palace, but cannot answer. Their mother waits for the seventh wind, the wildest of wild winds, to return home, so he can be asked. The seventh Wind comes and says the palace is still far away, and there will be a wedding there. The prince says he can walk with the wind with his boots, and the wind will create a distraction there to delay the wedding. After a while, the prince waits for the wind to join with him so they can fly together to the kingdom. They arrive; the prince puts on the cloak and goes to the princess's room, where there is a piece of bread and a flask of wine that never grow less. The prince, still invisible, uses the feathered hat to cause a commotion and demands the hand of the princess. She decides to marry the unseen suitor, and have a four-day celebration. After that time, the prince writes his story in a sword, with instructions to find him again, and leaves his ring as a token of recognition. He then uses the boots to make his way back to his kingdom, passing by a kingdom suffering a famine (to which he gives the bread) and another where people did not have feasts (where he leaves the flask of wine). Finally, after four years, a boy is born to the swan princess, and they decide to look for the boy's father, by riding all the way through kingdoms and mountains until they reach the prince's kingdom.

=== Finland ===
According to the Finnish Folktale Catalogue, established by scholar Pirkko-Liisa Rausmaa, type 400 is known in Finland with the title Kadonnutta vaimoa etsimässä ("Looking for a lost wife"): the hero finds a maiden of supernatural origin (who may be a swan maiden), loses her for some reason (after she arrives on her ship, or he spends too much time on a certain place); with the help of animals, he crosses three seas to find her at her enchanted castle. Rausmaa reported 127 Finnish variants, with most of them collected in the western part of the country.

Folklorist Kaarle Krohn collected a Finnish tale with the title Punaisen meren tarina ("The Story of the Red Sea"), which August Löwis de Menar translated as Das Märchen vom roten Meere ("The Story of the Red Sea"). In this tale, a father has a field that is destroyed every year on a certain night, so he orders his sons to keep watch on the fields. On the next two years, the elder sons fail in their vigil. On the third year after, the third son discovers the culprit: three birds fly in, take off their skins to become maidens, and dance on the fields. The third son steals their clothes and will only returns them if the third maiden agrees to marry him. As proof of her sincerity, she gives him her ring, takes back the garments and tells him to make preparations for their wedding. The next year, the flying maiden comes with her carriage, to celebrate her own wedding. However, a local king sees the maiden and wants to have her for himself, so he sets three tasks for the poor bridegroom: to fell an entire forest, then raise it back, and steal a key from a certain palace. The man fulfills the first two tasks, and goes to steal the key from the magic castle, but, on his way back, falls off the horse, due to the pursuing animals. Back to the marriage, the flying maiden decides to fly back to her own home, beyond the White Sea, the Black Sea and the Red Sea, in an underwater castle. Her peasant bridegroom learns of this and goes after her. On the road, he steals three magic objects from three men: a hat of invisibility, a magic sword and magic boots. Later, he reaches a ferrywoman that can ferry him through the White Sea. He makes the crossing, but the ferrywoman demands of him his hand. The man uses the hat and loses her. The same happens to the ferrywoman of the Black Sea. After he crosses the Red Sea, the ferrywoman summons all fishes of the sea, and a whale agrees to take the man to his bride's underwater palace.

== See also ==
- The Three Princesses of Whiteland
- Soria Moria Castle
- The Blue Mountains
- The King of the Gold Mountain
- Maid Lena (Danish fairy tale)
