= Soria Moria Castle =

Norwegian fairy tale

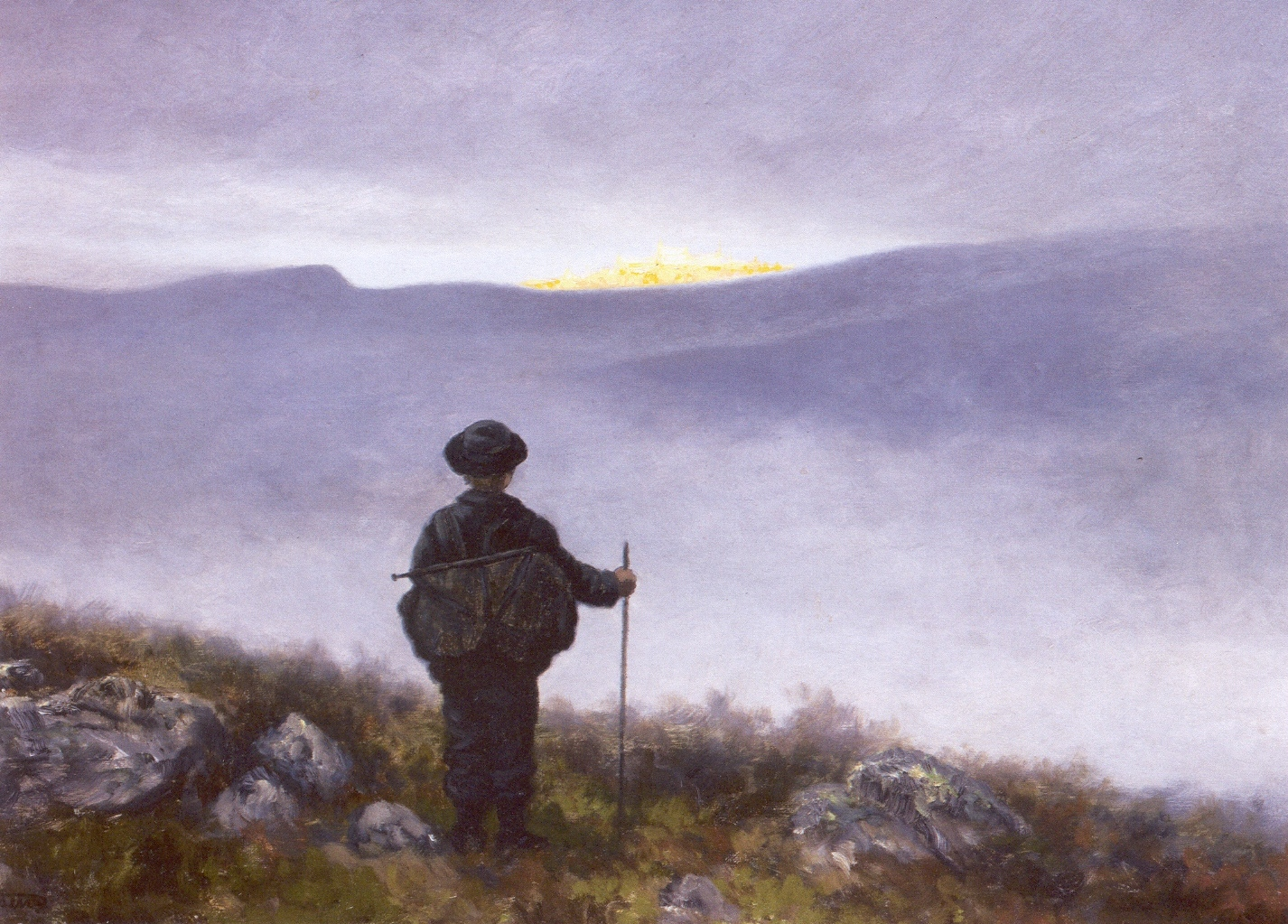
Far, far away Soria Moria Palace shimmered like Gold by Theodor Kittelsen (1900)

Soria Moria Castle (Norwegian: Soria Moria slott) is a Norwegian fairy tale made famous by Peter Christen Asbjørnsen and Jørgen Moe in their classical Norske Folkeeventyr. Later Andrew Lang included the story in his series of fairy tale collections in The Red Fairy Book.

== Synopsis ==
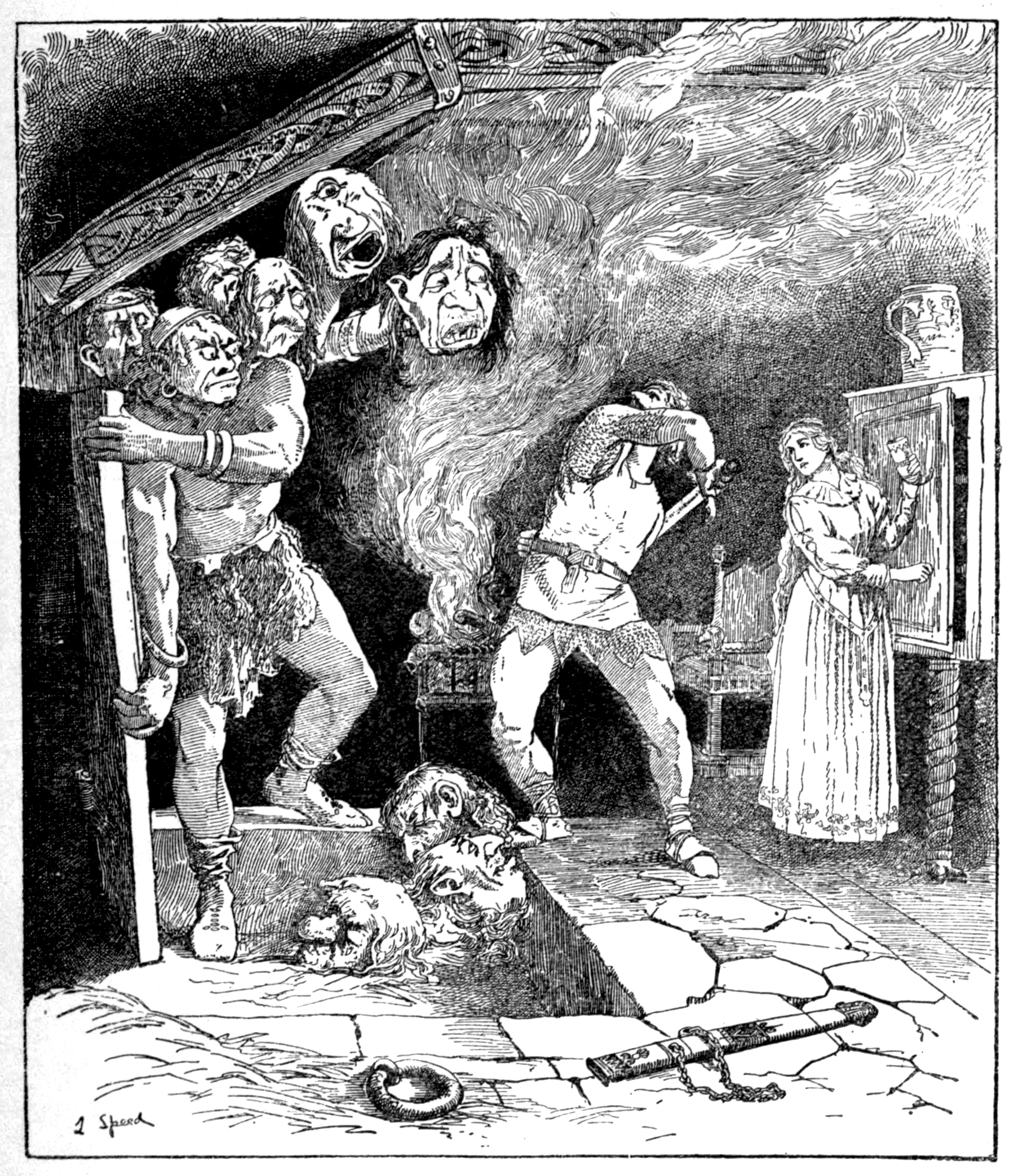
Illustration by Lancelot Speed in The Red Fairy Book

A poor couple had a son named Halvor who was like the Ash Lad (Norwegian: Askeladden), good for nothing but to sit about groping in the ashes. One day, a skipper asked him if he would like to go to sea. He went, and a storm blew them far off course. When Halvor got off the ship, he walked and found a castle. When he reached it, a princess warned him that a troll with three heads lived there and would eat him. Halvor refused to leave. The princess fed him and asked him to try to wield a sword. He could not, and she advised him to drink from a flask; afterwards, he could wield it. He killed the troll on its return. The princess told him of her two other sisters, also held captive by trolls, and Halvor rescued them as well, though one troll had six heads and the other nine.

They offered that any of them would marry him, and he chose the youngest princess, but he missed his parents and wanted to tell them what had happened. The princesses gave him a ring to wish himself there and back but warned him not to name them. His parents took a long time to recognize this grand lord as their son, but they were very pleased with him. The young women were abashed before him, because they used to mock him. He wished the princesses were there to show them how abashed they should be. They appeared. The youngest princess persuaded Halvor to lie down and sleep, put a ring on his finger, took the wishing ring and wished them back to Soria Moria Castle.

He set out to find them, bought a horse, and found a cottage with an old couple where the woman had a nose long enough to stir the fire with. He asked if they knew the way to Soria Moria Castle, and they did not, nor did the Moon when the old woman asked it, but the old woman traded him a pair of boots that took twenty miles a step for his horse, and asked him to wait for the West Wind. It knew where Soria Moria Castle was, and that there was to be a wedding there. Halvor set out with the West Wind to reach it. There, Halvor put the ring the princess had given him into a cup and had it brought to the princess. She recognized it and married Halvor instead of the new bridegroom.

== Commentary ==
To Norwegians Soria Moria Castle is probably among the best-known Norwegian folktales. The search for Soria Moria castle might be thought of as a progression, the symbol for perfect happiness. According to legend, the path to the castle is not clearly marked, and the journey is solitary because all people are different and therefore cannot reach the goal in the same manner. It is characteristic of most Norwegian folktales in that it contains a unique undertone of realism and folk humor. These folktales express many customary values, ideas, and characters. One of the most common values expressed is the idea of a common person rising above the circumstances of his birth and becoming successful.

The legend has continued to capture the Norwegian imagination. In 1881, Theodor Severin Kittelsen painted his well-known (to Norwegians) painting for publication in an edition of Norske Folkeeventyr. This legend was written as a poem within Ole Edvart Rølvaag's 1933 novel The Boat of Longing. More recently, it appeared in the form of a song titled Soria Moria in a 1989 album from Norwegian singer Sissel Kyrkjebø. The Declaration of Soria Moria, which was negotiated during 2005 at the Soria Moria Hotel in Oslo, formed the basis of the first and second government of the earlier prime minister of Norway, Jens Stoltenberg.

Musician Phil Elverum mentioned the painting of the castle and chasm on his 2017 album A Crow Looked At Me as Mount Eerie, using it as an allegory for the seemingly untraversable path taken to escape grief.

=== Tale type ===
The tale is classified in the international Aarne-Thompson-Uther Index as type ATU 400, "The Man on a Quest for the Lost Wife". In this tale type, the hero finds a maiden of supernatural origin (e.g., the swan maiden) or rescues a princess from an enchantment; either way, he marries her, but she sets him a prohibition. The hero breaks the prohibition and his wife disappears to another place. He goes after her on a long quest, often helped by the elements (Sun, Moon and Wind) or by the rulers of animals of the land, sea and air.

== Interpretation of the name ==
The exact meaning of the name Soria Moria is not known. It may be related to Moriah, the name given to a mountain range in the Book of Genesis. According to tradition, this was the place where Abraham almost sacrificed Isaac. It could also be related to the Greek words "sophia" (meaning 'wisdom') and "moria" (meaning 'foolishness').

J. R. R. Tolkien acknowledged that the name (in sound, not meaning) lay behind his "Mines of Moria".

== See also ==
- East of the Sun and West of the Moon
- Hind Horn
- The Beautiful Palace East of the Sun and North of the Earth
- The Raven
- The Rider Of Grianaig, And Iain The Soldier's Son
- The Sister of the Sun
- The Story of Bensurdatu
- The Three Princesses of Whiteland

== Other sources ==
- "Soria Moria Castle", Lang, Andrew. The Red Fairy Book London: Longmans 1890 transcript
