= The King of the Golden Mountain =

German fairy tale

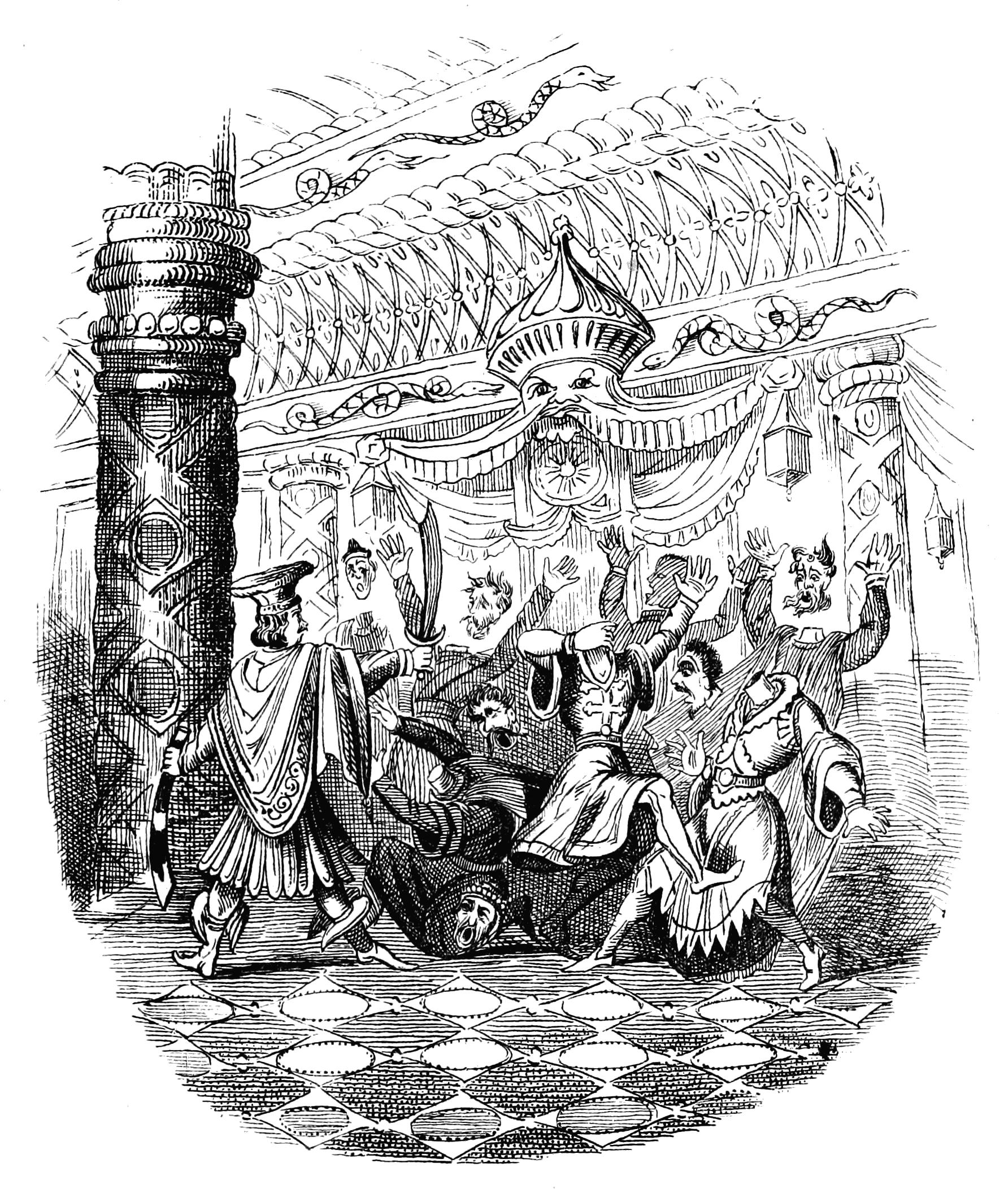
- 1876 illustration by George Cruikshank

Folk tale
- Name: The King of the Golden Mountain
- Aarne–Thompson grouping: ATU 810 + AaTh 401A, "The Enchanted Princess in Her Castle" + ATU 400, "The Man on a Quest for the Lost Wife"
- Country: Germany
- Published in: Grimm's Fairy Tales

"The King of the Golden Mountain" (German: Der König vom goldenen Berg) is a German fairy tale collected by the Brothers Grimm in Grimm's Fairy Tales (KHM 92).

The main version anthologized was taken down from a soldier; there is also a variant collected from Zwehrn (Zweheren) whose storyline summarized by Grimm in his notes.

== Synopsis ==
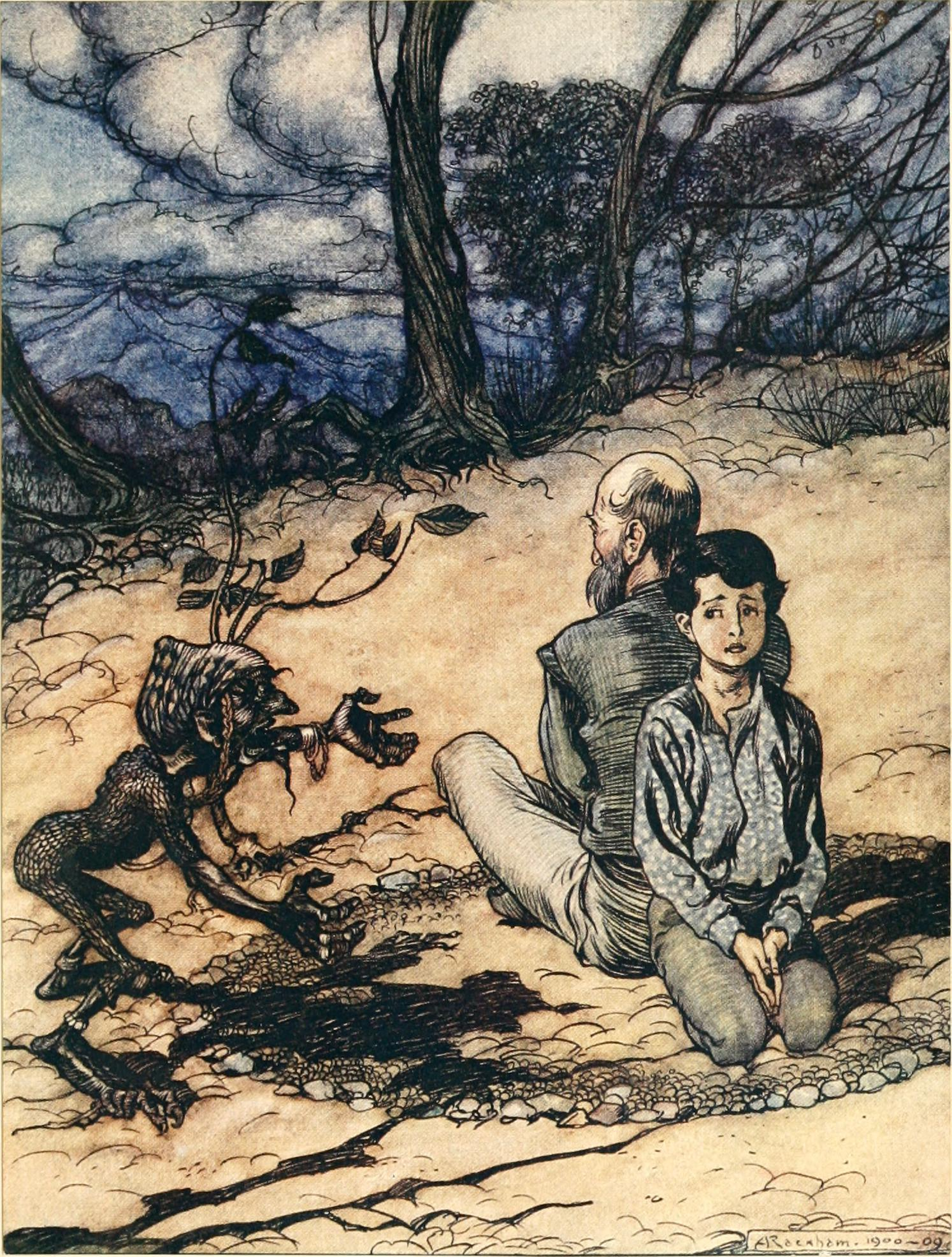
Son and father arguing with the black man, Arthur Rackham, 1916

A merchant with a young son and daughter lost everything except a field. Walking in that field, he met a black mannikin (dwarf) (Note: German Männchen, rendered "dwarf" in Edgar Taylor's translation, and "mannikin" in Margaret Hunt's.) who promised to make him rich if, in twelve years, he brought the first thing that rubbed against his leg when he went home. The merchant agreed. When he got home, his boy rubbed against his leg. He went to the attic and found money, but when the twelve years were up, he grew sad. His son got the story from him and assured him that the black man had no power over him. The son had himself blessed by a priest and went to argue with the black man. Finally, the mannikin agreed that the boy could be put in a boat and shoved off into the water.

The boat carried him to another shore. A snake met him, but revealed herself to be a transformed princess. She told him if for three nights he let twelve black men beat him, she would be freed. He agreed and did it, and she married him, making him the King of the Golden Mountain, and in time bore him a son. When the boy was seven, the king wanted to see his own parents again. His wife thought it would bring evil, but gave him a ring that would wish him to his parents and back again, telling him he must not wish her to come with him. He went, but to get in the town, he had to take off his fine and magnificent clothing and wear that of a shepherd's instead. Once inside, he persuaded his parents that he was their son, but could not persuade them that he was a king. Frustrated, he wished his wife and son with him. When he slept, his wife took the ring and wished herself and their son back to the Golden Mountain.

He walked until he found three giants quarreling over their inheritance: a sword that would cut off all heads but the owner's, if ordered to; a cloak of invisibility; and boots that would carry the wearer anywhere. Promising to solve their quarrel he persuaded them to let to him try the magical objects first, and with them, went back to the Golden Mountain, where his wife was about to marry another man. But at the banquet she was unable to enjoy any of the food or wine because the hero would invisibly take them away and consume them. The dismayed queen ran to her chamber, whereupon the hero revealed himself to her, rebuking her betrayal. Now addressing himself to the guests in the hall, he declared the wedding called off, as he was the rightful ruler, asking the guests to leave. As they refused to do this, and tried to seize him, the hero used his magic swords powers to behead all there save himself. He had now again assumed his place as King of the Golden Mountain.

== Analysis ==
=== Tale type ===
American folklorist D. L. Ashliman classified the story as types AaTh 401A ("The Enchanted Princess in Her Castle"), with an introduction of type 810 ("The Devil Loses a Soul That Was Promised Him"), and other episodes of type 560 ("The Magic Ring") and of type 518, ("Quarreling Giants Lose Their Magic Objects").

The tale is classified in the international Aarne-Thompson-Uther Index as type ATU 400, "The Man on a Quest for the Lost Wife": the hero finds a maiden of supernatural origin (e.g., the swan maiden) or rescues a princess from an enchantment; either way, he marries her, but she disappears to another place. He goes after her on a long quest, often helped by the elements (Sun, Moon and Wind) or by the rulers of animals of the land, sea and air (often in the shape of old men and old women).

The middle episode of the hero acquiring magic objects that help in his journey is classified as tale type ATU 518, "Men Fight Over Magic Objects": hero tricks or buys magic items from quarreling men (or giants, trolls, etc.). Despite its own catalogation, folklorists Stith Thompson and Hans-Jörg Uther argue that this narrative does not exist as an independent tale type, and usually appears in combination with other tale types, especially ATU 400.

The sequence of the hero enduring three nights of suffering in the princess's castle in order to rescue her is classified as tale type AaTh 401A, "The Enchanted Princess and their Castles". However, German folklorist Hans-Jörg Uther, in his revision of the international index, published in 2004, subsumed tale type AaTh 401A under the more general tale type ATU 400, "The Man on a Quest for the Lost Wife". Even Stith Thompson noted the great similarity between both types, but remarked that, in type 401, the story is more focused on the princess's disenchantment.

== See also ==
- The Girl Without Hands
- The Beautiful Palace East of the Sun and North of the Earth
- The Blue Mountains
- The Three Princesses of Whiteland
- Maid Lena (Danish fairy tale)
