= Magic ring =

Fictional or mythological piece of jewelry with supernatural powers

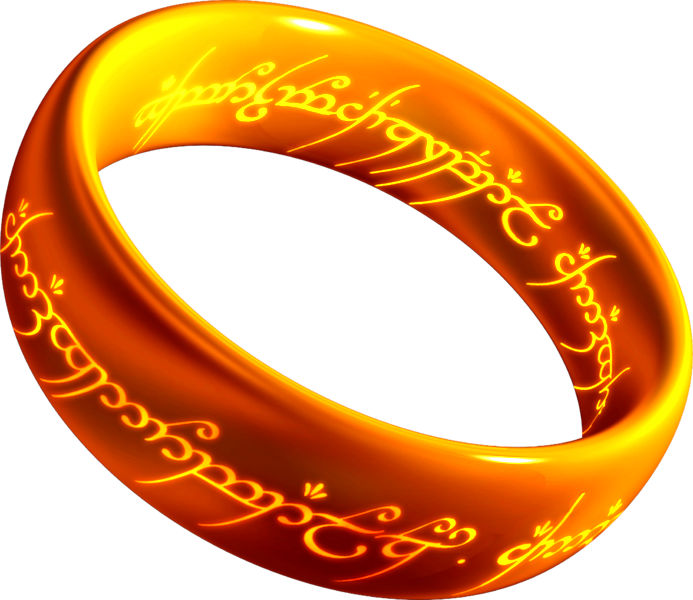
The fictional "One Ring" from The Hobbit and The Lord of the Rings. In these works, the ring makes the wearer invisible.

A magic ring is a mythical, folkloric or fictional piece of jewelry, usually a finger ring, that is purported to have supernatural properties or powers. It appears frequently in fantasy and fairy tales. Magic rings are found in the folklore of every country where rings are worn. Some magic rings can endow the wearer with a variety of abilities including invisibility and immortality. Others can grant wishes or spells such as neverending love and happiness. Sometimes, magic rings can be cursed, as in the mythical ring that was recovered by Sigurð from the hoard of the worm Fáfnir in Norse mythology or the fictional ring that features in The Lord of the Rings. More often, however, they are featured as forces for good, or as a neutral tool whose ethical status in the narrative derives from the character that uses it.

A finger ring is a convenient choice for a magic item: It is ornamental, distinctive and often unique, a commonly worn item, of a shape that is often endowed with mystical properties (circular), can carry an enchanted stone, and is usually worn on a finger, which can be easily pointed at a target.

== History ==
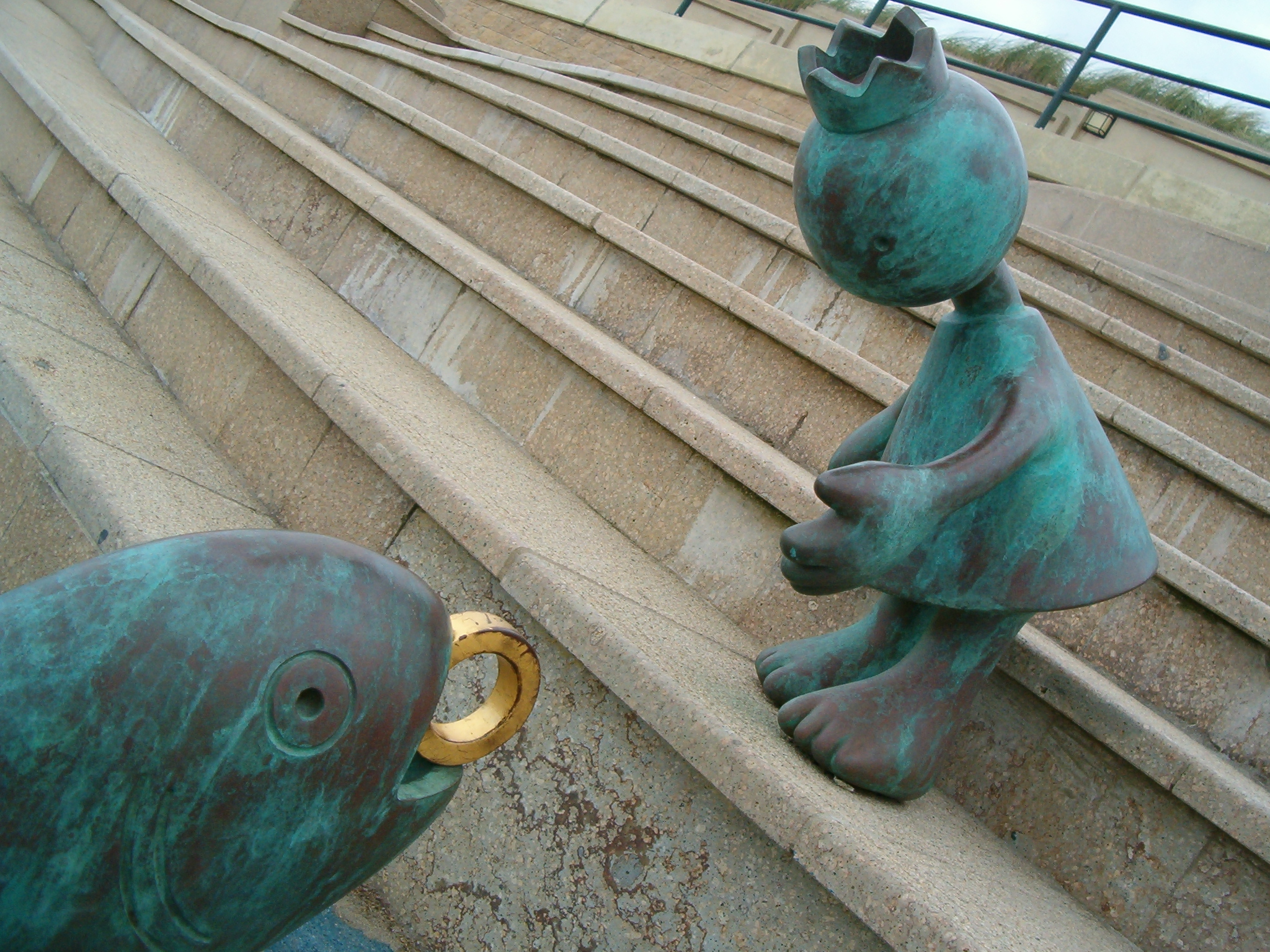
Statue in Scheveningen, Netherlands, depicting a variation on the fairytale "The Fisherman and His Wife"

Early stories of magical rings date to classical antiquity, although magic powers are not generally attributed specifically to rings in ancient Greek legend, even though many other magical objects are listed, particularly in the Perseus myth. During the late Greek classical era, Plato tells a story about the ring of Gyges, which conferred invisibility on its wearer, as a political allegory in the second book of The Republic. The shepherd Gyges, who found it in a cave, used its power to seduce the queen, kill the king, and take his place. However, it seems to have been a new story invented by Plato, rather than being ancient: Earlier accounts of Gyges the king of Lydia make no mention of any magic ring.

Josephus (8.2) repeats an anecdote of one Eleazar who used a magic ring to exorcise demons in the presence of Vespasian.

J.G. Frazer, in his study of magic and superstition in The Golden Bough, speculated that in the "primitive mind" rings can serve as devices to prevent the soul from leaving the body and to prevent demons from gaining entry. A magic ring, therefore, might confer immortality by preventing the soul's departure and thwart the penetration of any harmful magic that might be directed against the wearer. These magical properties inhibiting egress of the soul may explain "an ancient Greek maxim, attributed to [the ancient philosopher and mystic] Pythagoras, which forbade people to wear rings".

=== Medieval demonology and alchemy ===
Traditional medieval Arabic and Hebraic demonology both cultivated the legend of the Ring of Solomon, used to control demons and / or djinn. Tales of magic rings feature in One Thousand and One Nights, where the fisherman Judar bin Omar finds the ring of the enchanter Al-Shamardal, and the cobbler Ma'aruf discovers the signet of Shaddád ibn Aad. Each ring has powers from djinn magically confined in them. (Note: The two djinn are called, respectively, Al-Ra’ad al-Kasif (“Ear-deafening Thunder”) and Abú al-Sa’ádát (“the Father of Prosperities”). Based on their talismanic nature, both are “astral” demons. Their bonds are magical names from the repertoire of the “Solomonic Art”.) In the story Aladdin and the Magic Lamp, Aladdin also summons a second genie (djinn) from a finger ring given to him by the Maghrabi Magician. By the Renaissance era Solomon's ring had been adopted into Western magic, occultism, and alchemy.

Magic rings are known in medieval Jewish esoteric tradition; they are mentioned in the Talmud and Midrash. Solomon's magical ring had many properties in legend: making him all-knowing, conferring him with the ability to speak with animals, and bearing the special sigil that sealed djinn into bottles. A story about King Solomon and a ring is found in the Babylonian Talmud, but rings are more fully discussed in Jewish mystical literature. The power of a ring is in the divine name with which it is inscribed; such rings are used to invoke and command various guardians of heavenly palaces and to gain entrance to those heavens. (Note: For the use of such rings in halakhic literature see ref) In the Zohar, God is thought to own and use a signet ring, or, at least, a signet.

=== Germanic cultures ===
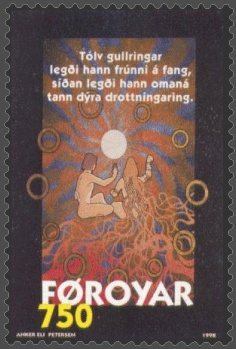
"Brynhild, Sigurd and the Rings" Faroe stamp depicting magical rings from Germanic mythology

A small number of Anglo-Saxon finger rings dating to the Viking Age bearing runic inscriptions of apparently magical significance have been discovered in England, such as the Kingmoor Ring and the Bramham Moor Ring. Rings endowed with special properties were significant in pagan Scandinavia. A 10th century pagan Icelandic chieftain had a temple in which an arm ring rested upon a stalli ("altar"), and upon which all oaths in the district were to be sworn, according to the 13th-century Eyrbyggja Saga.

A magical ring in Germanic mythology is the arm ring Draupnir, worn by the god Odin. Because its only reported function was to create more gold arm bands every nine days, Draupnir may have been a religious symbol meant to represent prosperity. The ring was placed onto Baldr's funeral pyre, but Baldr gave Draupnir back to Hermóðr and so the ring was returned to Odin from Hel.

Andvaranaut is the name of a ring at the center of the narrative in Germanic works such as the Middle High German Nibelungenlied and the Icelandic Völsunga saga. It eventually becomes the property of the hero Siegfried or Sigurð. In the Völsunga saga, it is a gold ring that the dwarf Andvari cursed when Loki stole it from him by force, for weregild to pay to the killed Óttar's bereaved father Hreiðmarr, who was also father to Fáfnir. After killing the rest of his family for the ring, Fáfnir transformed into a worm, and was later killed by Sigurð, who took Andvaranaut, and so inherited its curse. How Andvaranaut came to be cursed is explained in detail in Völsunga saga, as is the elaborate sequence of events of how the curse plays out for Sigurð, involving Sigurð changing shapes with his brother-in-law Gunnar. (Note: Byock (1990/1999) "Sigurd rides through the wavering flames of Brynhild, the daughter of Budl".) However, what magical use Andvaranaut might have to make it desirable is never specifically given in the narrative: The curse on it is simply a source of disaster for every person who owns it; its principal characteristic in the story is that nearly everyone wants to get it, except Sigurð, who has got it, but does not understand what it is that he's got.

=== Medieval romance ===
Sir Yvain is given a magic ring by a maiden in Chrétien de Troyes' 12th-century Arthurian romance The Knight of the Lion. This finger ring can be worn with the stone on the inside, facing the palm, and then it will make the wearer invisible. The 14th century Middle English Arthurian romance Sir Perceval of Galles has the hero, Perceval, take a ring from the finger of a sleeping maiden in exchange for his own, and he then goes off on a series of adventures that includes defeating an entire Saracen army in a Land of Maidens. Only near the end of this romance does he learn that the ring he was wearing is a magic ring and that its wearer cannot be killed.

Similar rings feature in the 14th century medieval romance Sir Eglamour of Artois and the 12th century Floris and Blancheflour, and in Thomas Malory's Tale of Sir Gareth of Orkney, in his 15th century epic Le Morte d'Arthur, in which Gareth is given a ring by a damsel who lives in Avalon that will render him invulnerable to losing any blood at a tournament. (Note: This ring also confers upon Sir Gareth the ability to disguise himself, the damsel explains, since "The vertu of my rynge is this: That that is grene woll turne to rede [red], and that that is rede woll turne in lyknesse to grene, and that that is blewe woll turne to whyghte and that that is whyght woll turne in lyknesse to blew; and so hit woll do of all maner of coloures; also who that beryth this rynge shall lose no bloode.)

In the medieval collection of Welsh tales called the Mabinogion, one of the romances – Geraint ab Erbin – has the eponymous character find a ring that grants him the powers of invisibility when worn. The Scottish ballads Hind Horn and Bonny Bee Hom both include a magic ring that turns pale when the person who received it has lost the person who gave it.

=== Later literature ===
François Fénelon, Archbishop of Cambrai, developed the motif of a magical invisibility ring in his literary fable History of Rosimund and Braminth. The tale was translated by Andrew Lang as The Enchanted Ring in his Green Fairy Book.

=== Folklore ===
In folkloristics, tale type ATU 560, "The Magic Ring", of the international Aarne-Thompson-Uther Index, was named after the magical object the hero receives in the tale.

== Modern fiction ==
Magic rings occur as incidental objects in a myriad of modern fantasy stories, but many novels feature a ring as a central part of the plot. Like other magical objects in stories, magic rings can act as a plot device, but in two distinct ways. They may give magical abilities to a person who is otherwise lacking in them, or enhance the power of a wizard. Or alternatively, they may function as nothing more than MacGuffins, that is, objects for which it is the characters' desire to obtain them, rather than any innate power that they possess, that moves the story along. J. R. R. Tolkien's The Hobbit, for example, involves a magical ring which enables Bilbo Baggins to be instrumental in a quest, on par with the considerable competence of his dwarvish companions, but Tolkien then later, in the Lord of the Rings, uses the ring differently, as a "MacGuffin" rather than a magical tool whose use is necessary for the plot: In the three volumes following The Hobbit, multiple nefarious antagonists attempt to acquire that same ring, and entire focus of the narrative centers on the efforts of the protagonists to dispose of it before it can be taken. Use of its magical abilities are rare, incidental, and not particularly important for unfolding the story.

=== The Ring of the Nibelung ===
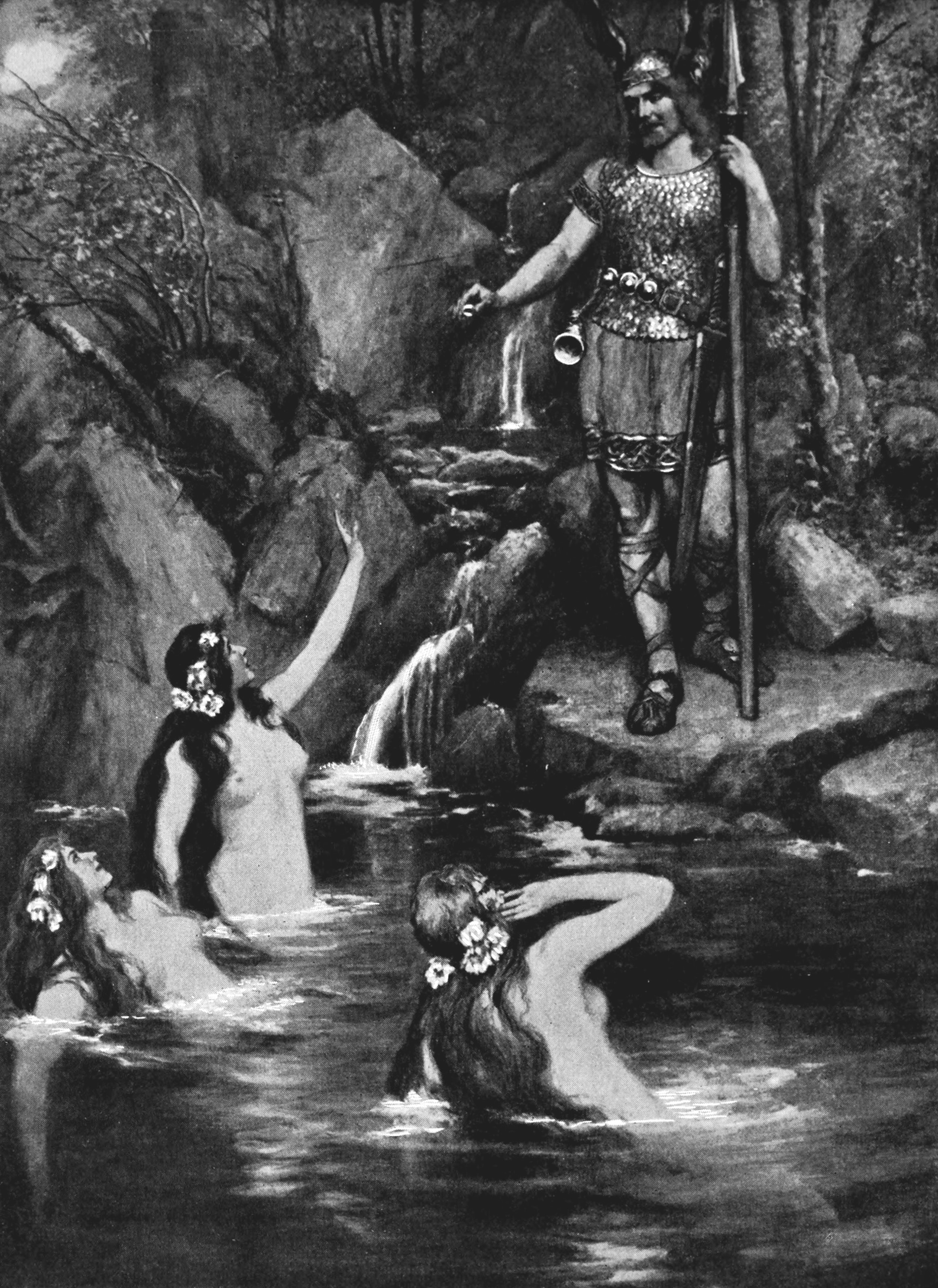
In this scene from Götterdämmerung, Siegfried tells the Rhinemaidens: "If you threaten my life, hardly you'll win from my hand the ring".

The composer Richard Wagner wrote a series of four operas titled Der Ring des Nibelungen which present his version of the story told in The Nibelungenlied and in Volsunga Saga, as well as the Prose Edda. The operas are more often called The Wagner Ring Cycle in English. In this cycle, the ring of the Nibelung ultimately brings about the downfall of the old gods as Brünnhilde returns the ring, which confers power, back to the Rhinemaidens from whom its gold was stolen in the first place.

=== The Oz books and other books by L. Frank Baum and followers ===
There are several magic rings in Baum's opus. One is in Sky Island, a ring which makes the wearer invisible except when another living creature is touching them. Another is in The Sea Fairies in which a mermaid gives Trot a ring which enables her to call on the mermaids for assistance when necessary. In Glinda of Oz, Glinda equips Dorothy with a magic ring with which she can call to Glinda from long distances, for assistance or rescue. In Ruth Plumly Thompson's sequel The Cowardly Lion of Oz one character has a magic ring which binds a messenger to fulfill his assignment, and turns him blue and stops him from being able to move, if he betrays the owner. (Unlike many magic rings, this one is activated when the owner takes it off.) In Merry-Go-Round in Oz, a brass ring which a rider of a merry-go-round can grab is also one of the three Circlets of the Kingdom of Halidom, which endows the people of that kingdom with dexterity and skill, when worn by a member of the Kingdom's royal family.

=== The Hobbit and The Lord of the Rings ===
J. R. R. Tolkien's fantasy novel The Hobbit was written as children's fiction, but as the story grew into The Lord of the Rings the matter expanded, borrowing from Germanic and Norse mythology for many of its themes, creatures, and names. Of twenty magical Rings of Power, four are described in some detail: The extremely powerful and dangerous "One Ring" around which the plot revolves; and three rings worn by the wizard Gandalf and the elves Elrond and Galadriel.

Seven Rings of Power were given to the dwarves in an only slightly successful attempt to corrupt them. Humans prove to be more susceptible; each of the nine Nazgûl were once great lords of men who were turned to terrifying wraiths and servants of the Dark Lord Sauron by their respective rings. The sixteen rings ultimately given to dwarves and men were created in a joint effort by the elves and Sauron. The three rings kept by the elves were forged by the elves alone, and Sauron had no direct hand in their creation. Sauron forged the One Ring in secret, with the intention that it would be a "master ring" and give him control over all the other rings, but was not completely successful in this aim.

Only the One Ring makes any appearance in The Hobbit, and then it is only known as a magic ring which makes the wearer invisible; its much larger and darker significance is not revealed until The Lord of the Rings. The history of the Rings of Power is described in its known entirety in The Silmarillion, in "Of the Rings of Power and the Third Age".

=== The Rose and the Ring ===
William Makepeace Thackeray's satirical novel The Rose and the Ring features a ring that has the power to make whoever owns it beautiful; its passage from person to person in the novel is an important element of the story.

=== The Chronicles of Narnia ===
In The Magician's Nephew, from C.S. Lewis' The Chronicles of Narnia series, two magic rings, which take people to the Wood between the Worlds, a linking room between parallel universes, are central to the story; a yellow ring, when touched, sends a person to the Wood Between the Worlds, while a green ring is used from there to bring that person into a world of their choosing. These rings were created by the magician "Uncle Andrew" by the use of magical dust from Atlantis.

=== Harry Potter series ===
The Harry Potter series, by author J. K. Rowling, features a magic ring bearing a coat of arms linked to the Peverell brothers, Harry Potter and Lord Voldemort's ancestors. It becomes one of the most important objects in Harry Potter's world because it contains a fragment of Voldemort's soul, and before it was pried apart by Dumbledore, it held one of the three Deathly Hallows: the Resurrection Stone, which can summon the dead.

=== Doctor Who ===
In the longest-running science-fiction series Doctor Who, the First Doctor sometimes used a ring with strange powers, which first appeared in The Web Planet where he used it to control a Zarbi. In Doctor Who's 20th anniversary story "The Five Doctors" the Ring of Rassilon, the legendary founder of Time Lord society, is said to confer immortality. Apparently this is how Rassilon has remained alive. However, when the renegade Time Lord Borusa puts the ring on he is turned to stone, as were others before him. This was a trap by Rassilon for renegade Time Lords.

=== Other appearances ===
  - Poul Anderson, in his novel A Midsummer Tempest, has Oberon and Titania gift the two protagonists, Rupert and Jennifer, magical rings that will aid them as long as they are true to each other.
  - Captain Planet and the Planeteers prominently features five magic rings which are given to the central characters by the goddess Gaia That can control the elements of Earth, Fire, Wind, Water and Heart. These rings can combine their power together to summon Captain Planet.
  - Piers Anthony has written Castle Roogna, which includes a ring that claims to be able to grant wishes.
  - In the DC Universe, there exists power rings that operate on a scientific, not magical, basis. These rings allow the bearer to conjure and wield any item the user imagines, only being limited by certain emotions. The original power ring originated from the Green Lantern Corps which is powered by willpower. The original Green Lantern, written by Alan Scott fashions a power ring from an ancient lamp that is a concentration of magic energy that the Guardians of the Universe created in an attempt to remove magic from the universe. As a result of this discovery, Scott's ring functions much like the standard Green Lantern rings, except that it cannot directly affect wood. The Blackest Night story line introduced other coloured rings, utilising different emotions to power the rings. Examples of these include the yellow rings powered by fear, red rings powered by rage and violet rings powered by love. Black and White wings are also represented being powered by Death and Life respectively.
  - E. Nesbit's The Enchanted Castle features a magic ring which bears whatever magical properties its owner declares it to have (it is used to turn characters invisible).^{(p 233)}
  - In The Elder Scrolls III: Morrowind, Moon-and-Star is a Dwarven ring of Chimer hero Nerevar. Moon-and-Star played a role in the Nerevarine Prophecies, as it allowed the Nerevarine, the reincarnation of Nerevar, to again unite the Great Houses and Ashlander clans, this time in the battle against the forces of Dagoth Ur.
  - The protagonist of the Jack Vance story "Liane the Wayfarer" finds a ring which is not a finger ring: it first appears as the size of a bracelet and can be stretched in size to serve as a magical portal.
  - In the online novel Pale Lights, Maryam is given a set of "rake-rings," which allow her to fight back against a parasitic spirit tampering with her magic.
  - In Sorcerer's Son, magic rings are central to the sorcerous art of demon-binding. The sorcerer Smada Rezhyk, the antagonist of the book, is so invested in these that he named his stronghold Castle Ringforge, and is constantly either making new demon rings or searching for new demons to bind into them.
  - In the TV show So Weird, a magical ring is worn by main character Fiona "Fi" Phillips and seems to be connected to the way she comes across strange and paranormal activity wherever she goes. In the beginning of the third season of the show, which begins with the actress for Fi leaving the show, the ring was passed on to the new main character, Annie Thelen for the remainder of the series.
  - In the Tanya Grotter book series, a Russian parody of Harry Potter, the heroine uses a magic ring that bears the voice of her great-grandfather in order to perform spells. Additionally, the other magicians in the series also use rings to perform magic.
  - The film Tom and Jerry: The Magic Ring sees Tom and Jerry fight over a magic ring of various abilities. Jerry, being unable to wear the ring as intended, instead wears the ring over his head like a crown.
  - The Vampire Diaries feature magic rings that allow vampires to walk in the sunlight. In the same series, a non-vampire is given a magic ring to protect them from harm.
  - In Andre Norton's novel The Zero Stone, the title comes from a ring that has advanced properties.

=== Video games ===
Magical rings frequently appear in video games as items, typically granting special abilities or effects such as stat bonuses.
