= The Declaration of Soria Moria =

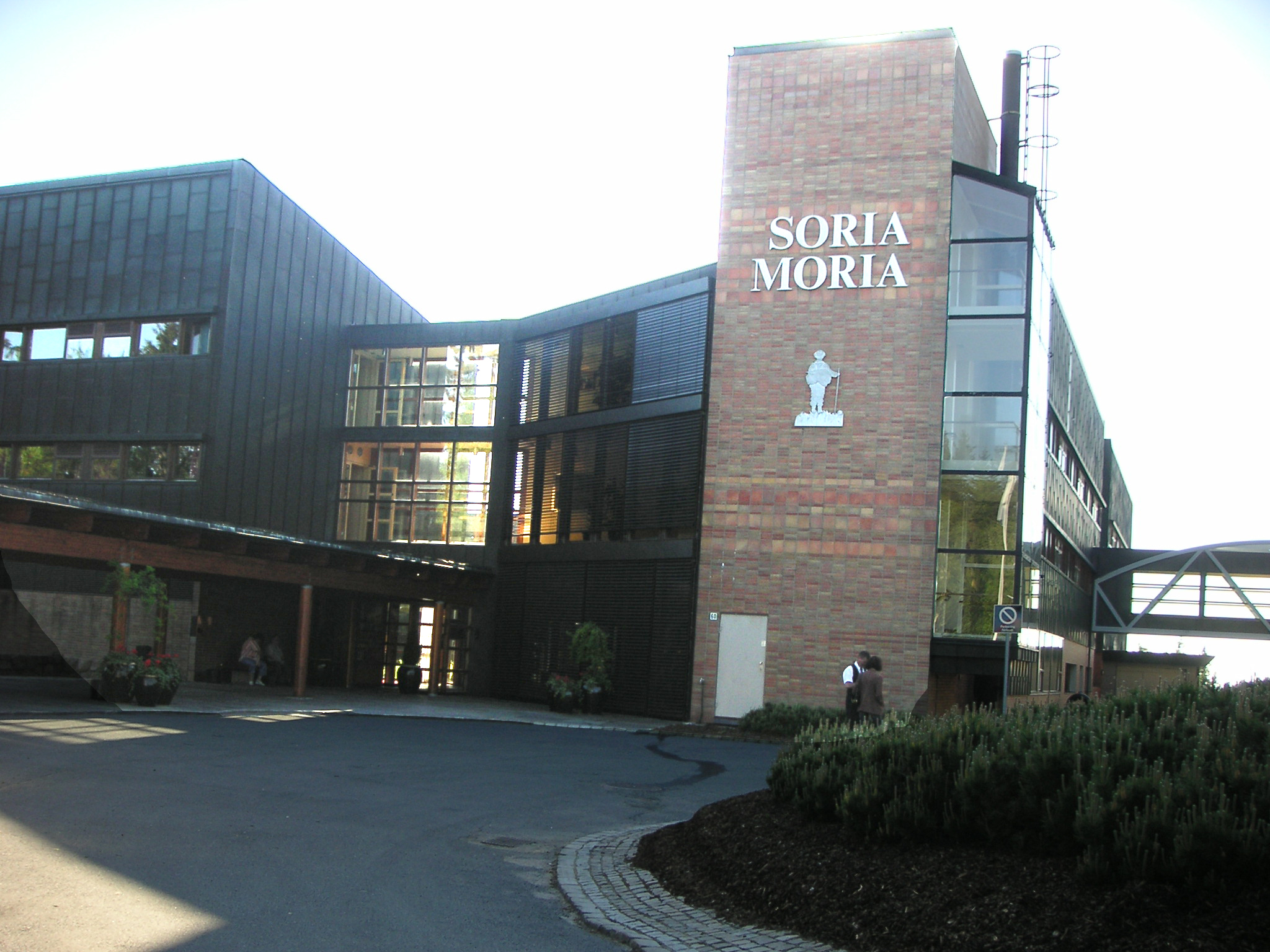
The Soria Moria Hotel in Oslo

The Soria Moria declaration is a Norwegian political statement forming the basis of Jens Stoltenberg's second and first government. The statement outlines the focus and priority of the so-called Red-Green Coalition government of Labour Party, the Centre Party and Socialist Left Party.

After the election victory on 12 September 2005, the three parties agreed to launch negotiations on government at the Soria Moria Hotel in Oslo. Negotiations began on 26 September and ended with a press conference on 13 November where the official government policy was presented. Soria Moria carries a reference to the famous Norwegian fairy tale about a poor lad's journey to the Soria Moria Castle, a Norwegian folk tale about a Shambhala like kingdom. On the way Halvor, the protagonist, have to fight a number of terrible trolls before conquering the heart of the princess of Soria Moria. The story ends with a fantastic wedding at the castle.

Among the topics that were negotiated for were:

- Oil exploration in the Barents Sea,
- Norwegian agricultural conditions, including ongoing negotiations in the World Trade Organization,
- Norwegian military participation in Afghanistan and Iraq; the declaration resulted in an apparent stop in Norwegian contributions to Operation Enduring Freedom, since these were seen as offensive operations without a UN mandate. Norway was instead to contribute to ISAF.
- organization of public hospitals,
- publicly funded school lunches,
- grades in school, and
- opportunity for same-sex marriage and adoption.
