= The Whummil Bore =

Traditional song

Song by Steeleye Span

from the album Bloody Men
- Released: 2006
- Songwriter: traditional

"The Whummil Bore" (Roud 3722, Child 27) is an English-language folk song. A whummil is a tool for drilling holes.

== Synopsis ==
The narrator served the king seven years and "saw his daughter only once"—meaning saw her naked, through a whummil bore. She was being dressed by her maids.

== Commentary ==
Only one variant of this ballad exists. "Hind Horn" appears to contain a stanza from it.

== Recording ==
This is recorded on the Steeleye Span 2006 album Bloody Men.

== See also ==
- List of the Child Ballads
