= Lissa Schneckenburger =

American folk violinist

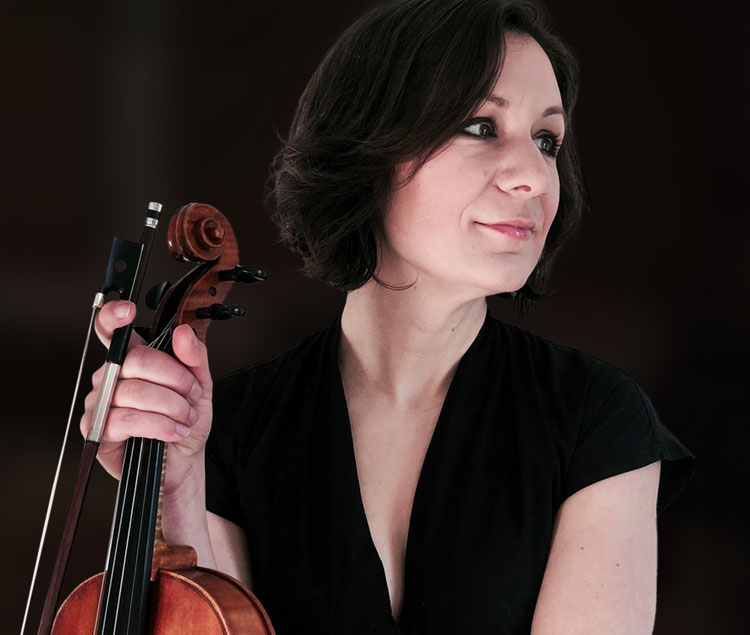

Background information
- Genres: Folk
- Occupations: Violinist, Teacher
- Instrument: Violin
- Website: http://www.lissafiddle.com

Lissa Schneckenburger (born May 11, 1979) is an American singer, songwriter, and traditional New England fiddler. She was raised in Maine and graduated with a Bachelor of Music in Contemporary Improvisation from New England Conservatory of Music in 2001. Schneckenburger currently resides in Vermont and has taught and performed across the United States and worldwide. She "performs traditional and contemporary folk repertoire from Downeast New England to Scottish, French Canadian, and contemporary folk music."

== Early life ==
Schneckenburger began playing fiddle at age 6 with the help of Carol Thomas Downing. She found her first fiddle mentor Greg Boardman at age 8 who she studied with until college. During her high school years Lissa not only collaborated on playing gigs with David Kaynor but also participated in fiddle workshops and camps with Alastair Fraser. Both David and Alastair played roles as mentors, influencing Schneckenburger’s musical journey and playing an integral role in shaping her musical career.

== Musical career ==
Lissa's playing earned her a scholarship to attend New England Conservatory of Music, where she performed on PBS with the NEC Klezmer Ensemble in A Taste of Chanukah and A taste of Passover, with host Theodore Bikel. She was also featured on the TV Special with Childsplay called "Childsplay: the story of Fiddles, Fiddlers, and a Fiddlemaker.

Lissa has played all over the world as a fiddler and vocalist, including appearances in Russia, Holland, Belgium, Denmark, Canada, and the United States. She has toured in bands: Lissa Schneckenburger (since 2001), Low Lily (since 2014), Childsplay (since 2006), Phantom Power (2001- 2009), and Halali (2000-2011). She has additionally performed with bands: Gaelic Storm, Solas, Le Vent Du Nord, Genticorum, The Fretless, Cherish The Ladies, and appeared on the Christmas Celtic Sojourn.

Lissa released her debut album Mad Hatter at age 18 in 1997, marking the beginning of a life-long career in music. She followed this with albums Different Game, Halali, and Phantom Power, all showcasing a blend of traditional tunes and original compositions.

In 2008, Lissa released her album "Song," followed by "Dance" in 2010, both of which fill a notable gap in the recorded repertoire of New England ballads and dance tunes.

"Thunder in my Arms," released in 2019, marks a departure as Lissa's first album as it features exclusively original compositions. Inspired by her experiences as a foster and adoptive parent, the album delves into themes of attachment, parenting, and resilience, resonating with listeners from different viewpoints on a deeply emotional level.

Lissa released her latest full-length album, "Falling Forward" in 2023, a collection of original fiddle tunes and traditional songs written at home during the early days of the pandemic.

Lissa has been interviewed and included in several publications including Beyond Talent: So You Want to Create a Career in Music, So You Want To Sing Folk Music by Valerie Mindel, and has been mentioned in North American Fiddle Music: A Research and Information Guide.

== Discography ==
=== Albums ===
Title	Release date	Label	Featured artists
The Mad Hatter	1997	Outer Green Records	
Different Game	2001	Footprint Records	Lissa Schneckenburger (fiddle & vocals) Hanneke Cassel (fiddle), Flynn Cohen (guitar), Laura Cortese (vocals), Rushad Eggleston (cello), Brian Hanlon (bodhran), Stuart Kenney (upright bass), Michael Kerry (guitar), Eric Merrill (viola), Keith Murphy (guitar & vocals), Laura Risk (fiddle) & Mark Simos (guitar)
Halali	2003	Footprint Records	Hanneke Cassel (fiddle, piano), Laura Cortese (fiddle, vocals). Lissa Schneckenburger (fiddle, vocals), Flynn Cohen (guitar).
Phantom Power	2003	Footprint Records	Bruce Rosen (piano), Lissa Schneckenburger (fiddle)
Lissa Schneckenburger	2005	Footprint Records	Lissa Schneckenburger (fiddle, vocals), Corey DiMario (double bass), Eric Merrill (viola, harmony vocals), Keith Murphy (guitar, mandolin), Matt Heaton (electric guitar), Natalie Haas (cello), Shannon Heaton (flute), Stefan Amidon (percussion), Ted Davis (guitar)
Song	2008	Footprint Records	Lissa Schneckenburger (fiddle and vocals), Austin Nevins (electric guitar), Corey DiMario (double bass), Dave Cory (tenor banjo), Eric Merrill (viola, harmony vocals), Hanneke Cassel (fiddle), Jeremiah McLane (piano, accordion), Keith Murphy (guitar, harmony vocals), Matt Heaton (guitar), Natalie Haas (cello), Rushad Eggleston (cello), Sam Amidon (harmony vocals), Sharon Shannon (button accordion), Stefan Amidon (percussion and harmony vocals)
Waiting for the Dawn	2009		By Childsplay, featuring Lissa Schneckenburger on fiddle
Dance	2010	Footprint Records	Lissa Schneckenburger (fiddle), Bethany Waickman (guitar, pump organ), Corey DiMario (double bass), Dave Cory (tenor banjo), David Harris (euphonium, trombone), David Kaynor (fiddle), Eric Merrill (viola), Jeremiah McLane (piano, accordion), Keith Murphy (guitar, piano), Stefan Amidon (percussion)
Covers	2013	Footprint Records	Lissa Schneckenburger (vocals, fiddle, ukulele), Aoife O’Donovan (guitar, piano, organ, harmony vocals), Corey DiMario (double bass), Tristin Clarridge (cello), Simon Chrisman (hammer dulcimer), Stefan Amidon (percussion), Ruth Ungar (harmony vocals)
As the Crow Flies	2013		By Childsplay, featuring Lissa Schneckenburger on fiddle and vocals
Low Lily EP	2013		Low Lily’s eponymous album includes six tracks with Liz Simmons on vocals and guitar, Flynn Cohen on vocals, guitar and mandolin, and Lissa Schneckenburger on vocals and fiddle
10,000 Days Like These	2018		Low Lily (Liz Simmons, Lissa Schneckenburger, and Flynn Cohen) with special guests Corey DiMario: upright bass, Duncan Wickel: cello, Stefan Amidon: drums & vocals, Charlie Van Kirk: percussion, Greg Liszt: banjo, Dirk Powell: banjo
The Bloom Of Youth	2018		By Childsplay
Thunder in my Arms	2019	Footprint Records	Lissa Schneckenburger (lead vocals, violin) Stefan Amidon (drums, harmony vocals) Ross Bellenoit (electric guitar) Zara Bode (harmony vocals) Corey DiMario (double bass) Natalie Haas (cello) Jefferson Hamer (acoustic guitar) Curtis Hasselbring (trombone) Cole Kamen-Green (trumpet) Ryan McKasson (viola) Emily Milly (harmony vocals) Alec Spiegelman (pump organ, woodwinds, saxophones, electric guitar) Jed Wilson (piano)
Falling Forward	2023	Footprint Records	Katie McNally (producer, fiddle) Rachel Aucoin (piano) Mali Obomsawin (double bass) Karen Tweed (accordion) and Natalie Haas (cello)

=== Singles ===
Title	Release date	Label	Featured artists
Labor On	2020	Footprint Records	Lissa Schneckenburger (vocals), Neil Pearlman (piano), Corey DiMario (double bass), Stefan Amidon (drums), Zara Bode (harmony vocals)
Bedlam Blues	2021	Footprint Records	Lissa Schneckenburger (vocals) and Jefferson Hamer (acoustic guitar)

=== Music videos ===
Title	Release date	Notes
The Lumberman in Town	2010	The Lumberman In Town/ Go Ken Go, recorded on the full-length album Song, featuring Lissa Schneckenburger, Bethany Waickman, Owen Marshal, Keith Murphy, Corey DiMario, Stefan Amidon, Sharon Shannon, and Eric McDonald
Hope Lingers On	2018	Hope Lingers On, recorded on the full-length album “10,000 Days Like These” by Low Lily
Look Away	2019	Look Away, written and recorded by Lissa Schneckenburger, from the full-length album Thunder in My Arms, released on May 17, 2019. The album was written for foster and adoptive families on the topics of attachment, developmental trauma, and resiliency.
They Sent Me a Picture	2019	"They Sent Me a Picture" written by Lissa Schneckenburger and Mark Erelli, from the full-length album Thunder in My Arms. The album was written for foster and adoptive families on the topics of attachment, developmental trauma, and resiliency. Moving "crankie" artwork by Brendan Taaffe.
The 11th Labor of Hercules	2019	Music by Lissa Schneckenburger, Lyrics by GennaRose Nethercott, Choreography by Molly Gawler, Video by Dylan Ladds Filmed at the Union Farmers Market in Belfast Maine Recorded on the full-length album, Thunder in My Arms. Lissa Schneckenburger (lead vocals) Stefan Amidon (drums) Corey DiMario (double bass) Curtis Hasselbring (trombone) Cole Kamen-Green (trumpet) Alec Spiegelman (clarinet), Jed Wilson (piano) Produced and arranged by Schneckenburger/ Spiegelman.
Labor On	2020	“Labor On” by Lissa Schneckenburger (vocals), Corey DiMario (double bass), Neil Pearlman (piano), Stefan Amidon (drums), Zara Bode (harmony vocals). Recorded, mixed, and mastered by Al Stockwell, Brattleboro VT. Special thanks to Write for Climate: Abby Mnookin, Becky Karush, Rebecca Jones, Marisa Keller, and Robin MacArthur. Photo credits: Train blockade protests, NoCoalNoGas.org Merrimack Generating Station protests, NoCoalNoGas.org Climate Solutions march, Lissa Schneckenburger and Zac Rudge Standing Rock, Abby Mnookin Workers with solar panel, cleantechsandiego.org. All other images, creativecommons.org.
Bedlam Blues	2021	Lissa Schneckenburger (vocals) Jefferson Hamer (acoustic guitar). Music by Lissa Schneckenburger and lyrics by GennaRose Nethercott. Arrangement by Schneckenburger/ Spiegelman Produced by Lissa Schneckenburger and Alec Spiegelman. Recorded by Alec Spiegelman at The Chamber of Commerce (Brooklyn, NY). Mixed by Robin MacMillan at Faraway Sound (Brooklyn, NY). Mastered by Toby Mountain at Northeastern Digital (Southborough, MA). Video by Corinn Colford. Graphic design by Lissa Schneckenburger.
Since The Day We Met	2020	Recorded on the full-length album, Thunder in My Arms.
We Are Never Ever Ever Getting Back Together Parody	2021	Lyrics by Lissa Schneckenburger Music by Taylor Swift, Max Martin, and Shellback Performed by Low Lily (Lissa Schneckenburger- vocals, Liz Simmons- vocals, Flynn Cohen- vocals, mandolin, electric bass, acoustic and electric guitars, Stefan Amidon- drums) Recorded, mixed and mastered by Gabe Bradshaw, Hawkmoon Audio
Round of Blues	2022	Liz Simmons– vocals, acoustic guitar Flynn Cohen– vocals, acoustic guitar Lissa Schneckenburger– vocals, fiddle With: Dirk Powell– upright bass, electric guitar, percussion Bill Smith– drums Produced by Dirk Powell Original words and music by Shawn Colvin & Lawrence Klein.
Falling Forward	2023	Filmed and edited by Rebecca Branson Jones in Brattleboro VT. Musicians: Lissa Schneckenburger, Amanda Witman, Mary Lea, Erica Morse, Peter Siegel, Louisa Engle, Gil Rosenberg, Emma Schneider, Arthur Davis, Brendan Taaffe, Donal Sheets, Rachel Lindsey, Niamh Lindsay-Sheets, Yann Falquet, Shawn Magee, Matt Neikirk, Desha Peacock, Crista Yagjian, and Nate Feindel.
Sorry for the Divots	2023	"Sorry For The Divots/ For Grada" written and recorded by Lissa Schneckenburger, with Rachel Aucoin (piano), Mali Obomsawin (double bass), and Karen Tweed (accordion). From Falling Forward. Filmed and edited by Rebecca Branson Jones in southern Vermont on the ancestral unceded lands of the Abenaki and Wabanaki Confederacy. We recognize these people as the past, present, and future stewards of this land.
