= The Blue Mountains (fairy tale) =

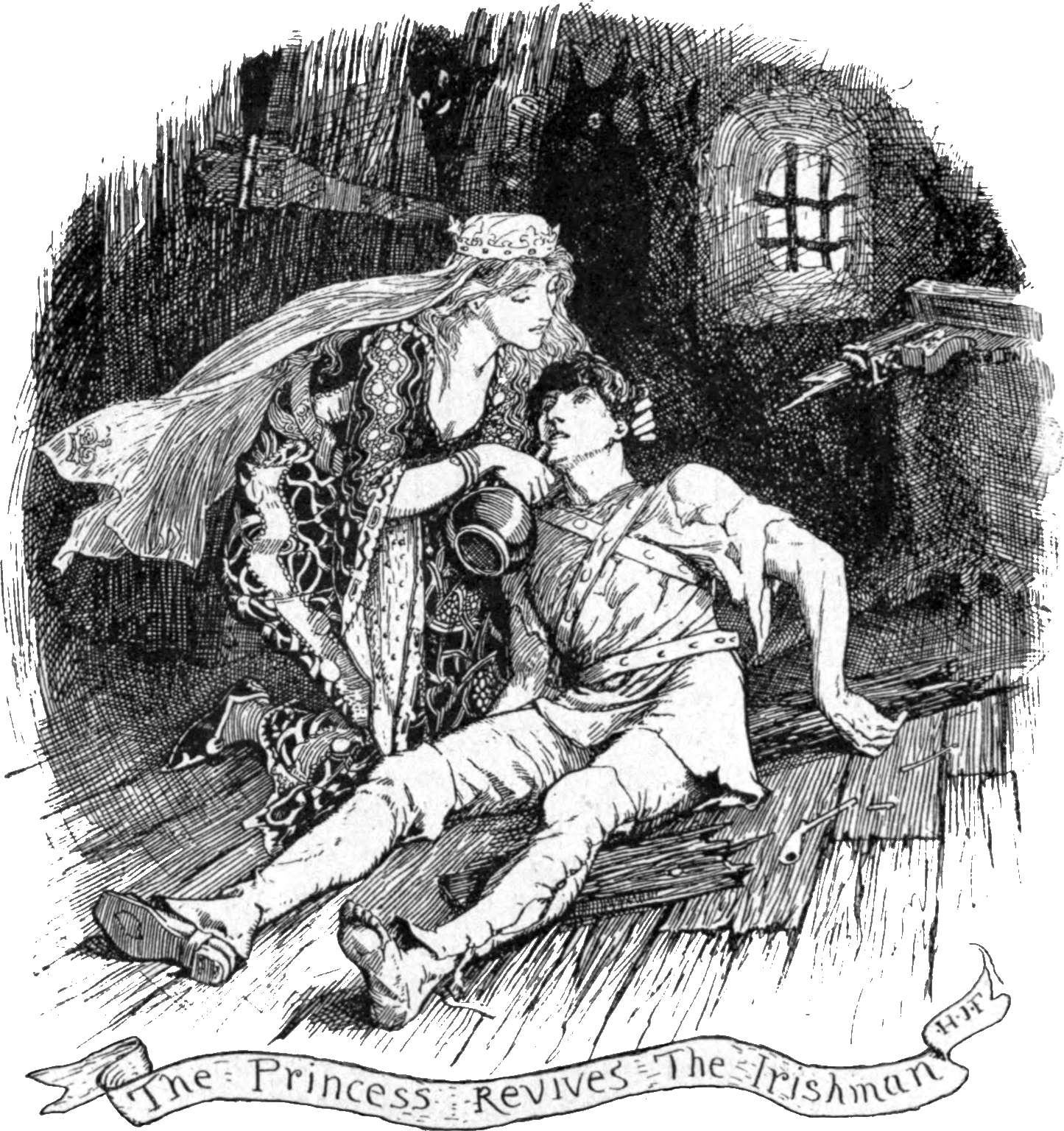
The princess heals the Irishman

The Blue Mountains is a fairy tale. Andrew Lang included it in The Yellow Fairy Book (1894), but provided no bibliographical information and its origin remains obscure.

== Synopsis ==
A Scotsman, an Englishman and an Irishman all ran away from the army together. After several days, the Scotsman saw a castle, went to it without speaking to the others, and met a lady. At his request, she gave him a meal and a bed to sleep. And then the same thing happened to the Englishman.

The Irishman saw the same castle and went to it, but when the lady gave him food, he stared about the castle and did not eat. When she asked, he said he could not eat without knowing who she was or where she came from, or how she came there. She told him she was an enchanted princess, and if a man stayed in a little room from ten until midnight for three nights running, she would be freed. Every night creatures came into the room and beat him, but the princess had a bottle that cured him every morning.

She went off and told him she would back in a coach and six. A little lad came, and when he went to wait for the princess, the lad stuck a pin in his coat, putting him to sleep. When the princess came, the lad told her he was asleep. The princess said she would come once more, and then he would not see her again. The Irishman resolved to keep awake, but the boy stuck the pin in his coat again, and the princess left, leaving him a sword.

He woke up the other men in the castle and gave them silver and plate to carry away and set out in search of her. Three years later, he pulled out the sword in order to kill himself and found written on it, "You will find me in the Blue Mountains". He set out in search of the Blue Mountains and found an old man who had not seen anyone in three hundred years. The old man, that night, looked through his book, which contained the history of the world, but found nothing of where the Blue Mountains were. He blew a magical whistle, which let the Irishman travel to his brother's, nine hundred miles away, in a day. This brother summoned all the birds to consult them. Last of all, an eagle came; it had come from the Blue Mountains. The eagle said that the daughter of the king of the Blue Mountains was about to marry, because she had agreed with her father that if the man who had saved her had not arrived in that time, she would marry.

The eagle said if they killed sixty cattle and the Irishman would throw quarter of one into its mouth every time it turned its head, it could carry him. So he and the old man hunted, and it flew off with him and the meat, but near the castle, the meat ran out, and the eagle threw him off. He landed in the bay and was able to get ashore. He gave a guinea to the king's henwife to bring the princess to him. She recognized the Irishman and married him instead of her new bridegroom.

== Analysis ==
=== Tale type ===
The tale is classified in the international Aarne-Thompson-Uther Index as type ATU 400, "The Man on a Quest for the Lost Wife". In this tale type, the hero finds a maiden of supernatural origin (e.g., the swan maiden) or rescues a princess from an enchantment; either way, he marries her, but she sets him a prohibition. The hero breaks the prohibition and his wife disappears to another place. He goes after her on a long quest, often helped by the elements (Sun, Moon and Wind) or by the rulers of animals of the land, sea and air.

=== Motifs ===
The episode of the journey on the eagle's back is parallel to similar events in many fairy tales, where a hero needs to feed pieces of meat to the eagle for the remainder of the journey, otherwise it will not complete its flight. In this regard, folklorist scholarship recognizes its similarities with the tale of Etana helping an eagle, a tale type later classified as Aarne–Thompson–Uther ATU 537, "The Eagle as helper: hero carried on the wings of a helpful eagle".

The sequence of the hero enduring three nights of suffering in the princess's castle in order to rescue her is classified as tale type AaTh 401A, "The Enchanted Princess and their Castles". However, German folklorist Hans-Jörg Uther, in his revision of the international index, published in 2004, subsumed tale type AaTh 401A under the more general tale type ATU 400, "The Man on a Quest for the Lost Wife". Despite the reclassification, according to Stefanie Rühle, in Enzyklopädie des Märchens, although both types share the sequence of the man's quest for his vanished wife, type 401 is preceded by the motif of the hero enduring three nights of torment in the princess's castle and the motif of missing out meeting his wife by sleeping through it.

== Variants ==
=== Scotland ===
In a Scottish tale from Argyllshire, titled Rìoghachd Nam Beann Gorma or The Kingdom of the Green Mountains, a sergeant, a corporal and a private desert from the army. The next day, the sergeant goes to a castle where he is invited to come in and eat with the mistress of the castle. She snuffs out the candles, and bids him choose his dish. The sergeant does, and the mistress orders some servants to lock him up. This happens again with the corporal. Finally, the private goes to the castle and is invited to eat with the mistress. She also snuffs out the candles, and, in the dark, the private chooses her company instead of the food. This pleases the lady, who reveals she is the daughter of the King of the Green Mountains, having decided to marry a lowborn commoner. The lady sets a date for their marriage and gives him some gold to buy finer garments for the occasion from a tailor. However, the tailor, advises by his own mother, tricks the private by giving him two fruits that make him fall sleep (first, an apple, then a pear), and finally pricks the private with a pin, thus impeding his meeting with the princess. The princess, on the first occasion, gives the tailor a ring to be given to her bridegroom, and promises to return the next time. The second time, the princess gives a penknife, and finally a gold pin, and declares she will not await for him anymore, and returns to her kingdom. The private wakes up and decides to go after her, all the way to the Kingdom of the Green Mountains.

=== Canada ===
In a tale titled Na Beanntaichean Gorma ("The Blue Mountains"), collected in Cape Breton, the soldiers are a "Lowlander", a Gael and an Irishman. The princess convinces the Irishman to help her break the curse, but he fails. He then must travel to the Blue Mountains in order to find her again. This second tale was classified by the compiler as Aarne–Thompson–Uther Index ATU 400, "The Quest for the Lost Wife", with variants in the Highlands, including the Isle of Barra in the Outer Hebrides.

== See also ==
- Prâslea the Brave and the Golden Apples
- The Beautiful Palace East of the Sun and North of the Earth
- The Bold Knight, the Apples of Youth, and the Water of Life
- The King of Lochlin's Three Daughters
- The King of the Golden Mountain
- The Raven
- The Three Dogs
- The Three Princesses of Whiteland
