= The Kitchie-Boy =

Traditional song

"The Kitchie-Boy" (Child 252, Roud 105, also known as "Bonny Foot-Boy" or "Earl Richard's Daughter") is a traditional English-language folk song.

== Synopsis ==
A lady falls in love with the kitchen boy. She manages to speak with him, but he is afraid that her father will kill him. She takes her dowry and has a bonny ship built, and the kitchen boy sets sail in it. When he comes to her father's castle, her father is convinced that he is a squire and a fit suitor. Sometimes, he arrives in disguise and tests her by claiming to have taken a love-token from a dead man, but she refuses him until he reveals the truth.

The father marries him to his daughter. In some variants, nine months later, the daughter reveals the truth at her son's christening, and her father accepts it, as proof of her cunning.
