= The Three Princesses of Whiteland =

Norwegian fairy tale

Folk tale
- Name: The Three Princesses of Whiteland
- Aarne–Thompson grouping: ATU 400, "The Man on a Quest for the Lost Wife"
- Country: Norway
- Published in: Norske Folkeeventyr; The Red Fairy Book

"The Three Princesses of Whiteland" (De tre prinsesser i Hvittenland) is a Norwegian fairy tale, collected by Norwegian writers Peter Christen Asbjørnsen and Jørgen Moe in their collection of folktales and legends Norske folkeeventyr (1879). Scottish poet and novelist Andrew Lang collected it his The Red Fairy Book (1890).

== Synopsis ==
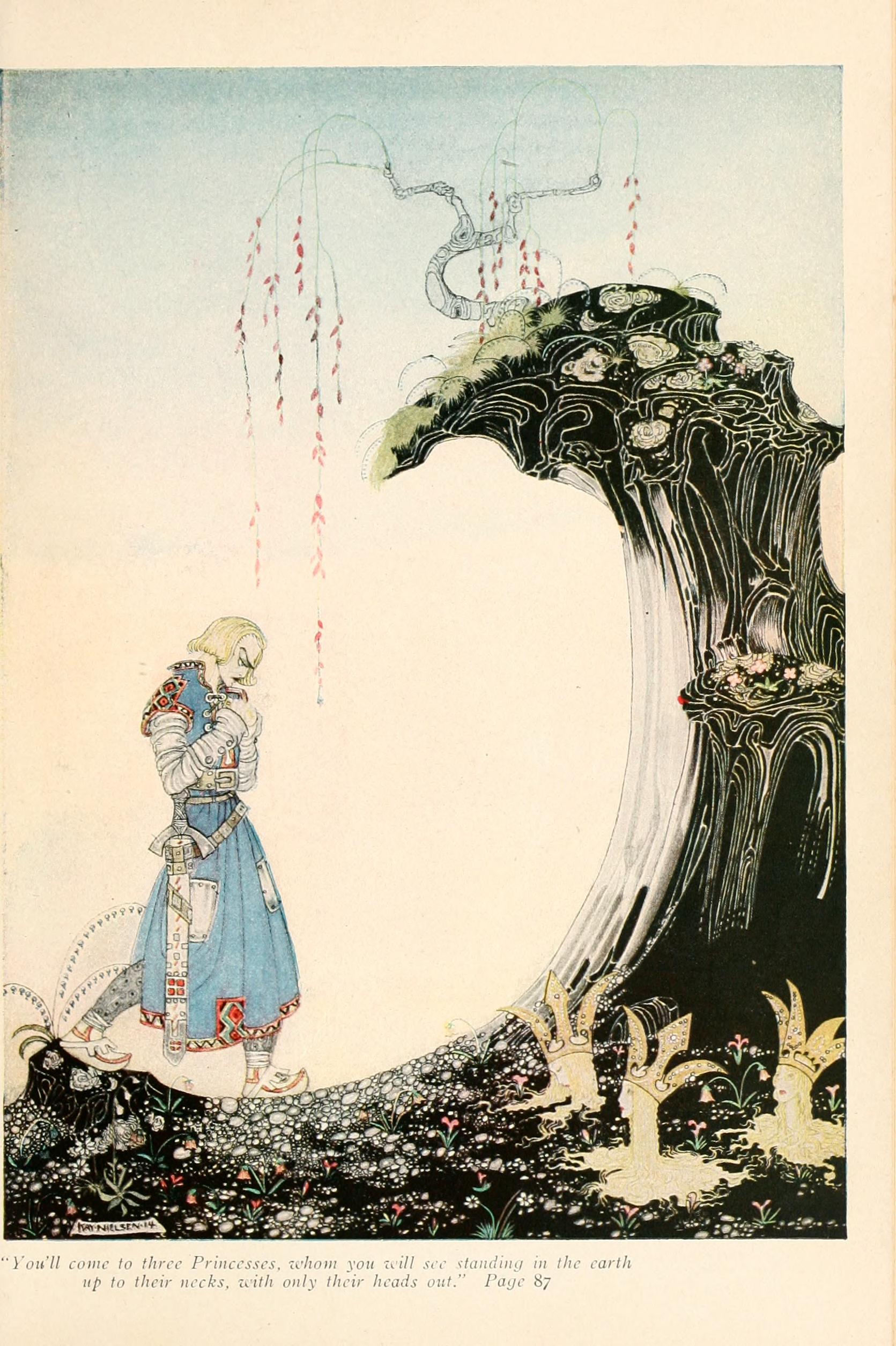
He would come to three princesses buried up to their necks in sand

A fisherman caught nothing one day, and near evening, a head popped up from the water, to make a bargain for him: fish for what his wife carried under her girdle. When he returned home, his wife told him that she was pregnant and the baby was what he had offered. The king heard of their story and offered to raise their son when he was born, to protect him, but when the boy was grown, he begged to go with his father fishing for one day, and as soon as he set foot in the boat, it was dragged off to a far land.

He met an old man, who told him that he had come to Whiteland. If he walked down the shore, he would come to three princesses buried up to their necks in sand. If he passed by the first two and spoke to the third, the youngest, it would bring him good luck.

The youngest princess told him that three trolls had imprisoned them there. If he went up into the castle by the shore and let each troll beat him for one night, the princesses would be freed. A flask of ointment by the bed there would cure all the injuries he suffered, and a sword would let him cut off their heads.

The first troll had three heads and three rods, and when he had suffered the princesses stood in the sand up to their waists; the second had six heads and six rods, and the princesses stood in sand up to their knees; the third had nine heads and nine rods, and beat him so severely that he could not reach for the ointment, but it threw him against the wall, and the flask broke, spilling ointment on him, and he killed it, freeing the princesses entirely.

He married the youngest and lived happily with her for several years, but at the end of them, he wanted to visit his parents. His wife finally agreed but told him that he must do only what his father asks, not what his mother wishes, and gave him a ring that would grant two wishes, one to go home and one to return. He went, and his mother wanted to show him to the king. His father said not to, but in the end she had her way, and while at the king's, he wished that his wife was there to compare to the king's. That summoned his wife and used up his second wish. Sadly, his wife took the ring, knotted a ring with her name on it in his hair, and wished herself home again.

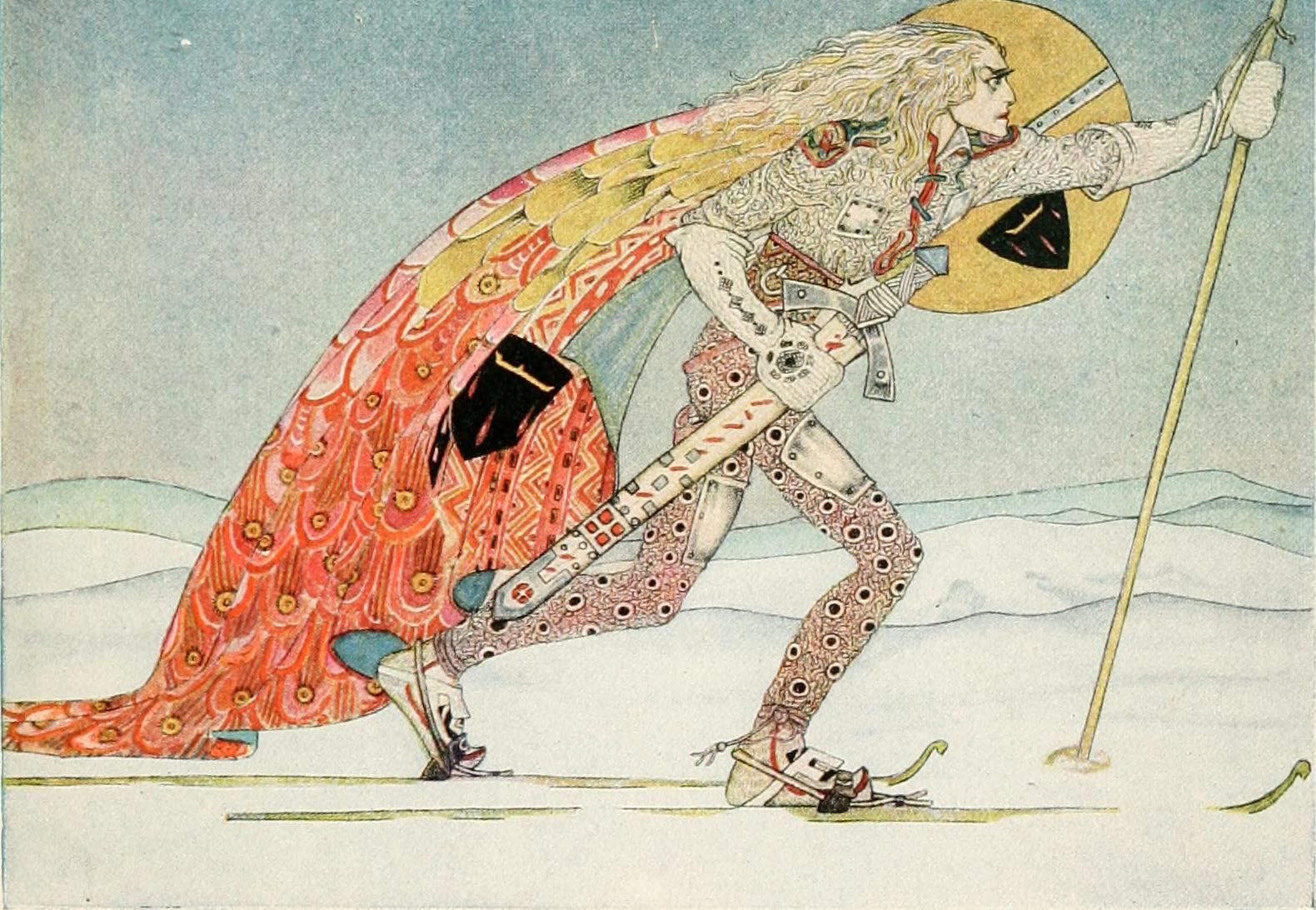
So the king lent the man a pair of snowshoes to reach his brother.

He decided to see if he could reach Whiteland on his own and set out. He came to the king of all the animals and asked if he knew the way. He did not, and neither did all the animals when he summoned them, so the king lent the man a pair of snowshoes to reach his brother, who was the king of all the birds. The king of the birds did not know, and neither did the birds, so that king lent him a pair of snowshoes to reach his brother, the king of all the fish. The third king did not know, but an old pike, the last of all the fish to arrive, knew the way and that his wife was to remarry the next day.

The king sent him to a field where three brothers had fought for a hundred years over a magical hat, cloak, and pair of boots, which would let the wearer make himself invisible and wish himself wherever he wanted. He tricked the brothers into letting him try them and set out to Whiteland. He met the North Wind on the way, and it promised to storm the castle as if to blow it down when it reached the land after him. He arrived, and the North Wind carried off the new bridegroom. His wife recognized him by the ring in his hair.

== Analysis ==
=== Tale type ===
The tale is classified in the international Aarne-Thompson-Uther Index as type ATU 400, "The Man on a Quest for the Lost Wife". In this tale type, the hero finds a maiden of supernatural origin (e.g., the swan maiden) or rescues a princess from an enchantment; either way, he marries her, but she sets him a prohibition. The hero breaks the prohibition and his wife disappears to another place. He goes after her on a long quest, often helped by the elements (Sun, Moon and Wind) or by the rulers of animals of the land, sea and air.

== Legacy ==
De tre prinsesser i Hvidtenland is the name given to tale type ATU 400 in Ørnulf Hodne's The Types of the Norwegian Folktale.

== See also ==
- Black Bull of Norroway
- Cinderella
- East of the Sun and West of the Moon
- Nix Nought Nothing
- Snow White
- Soria Moria Castle
- The Beautiful Palace East of the Sun and North of the Earth
- The Blue Mountains
- The King of the Gold Mountain
- The Raven
- The Rider Of Grianaig, And Iain The Soldier's Son
- The Sister of the Sun
- The Three Dogs
- What Came of Picking Flowers
