= Black Bull of Norroway =

Scottish fairy tale

The Black Bull of Norroway
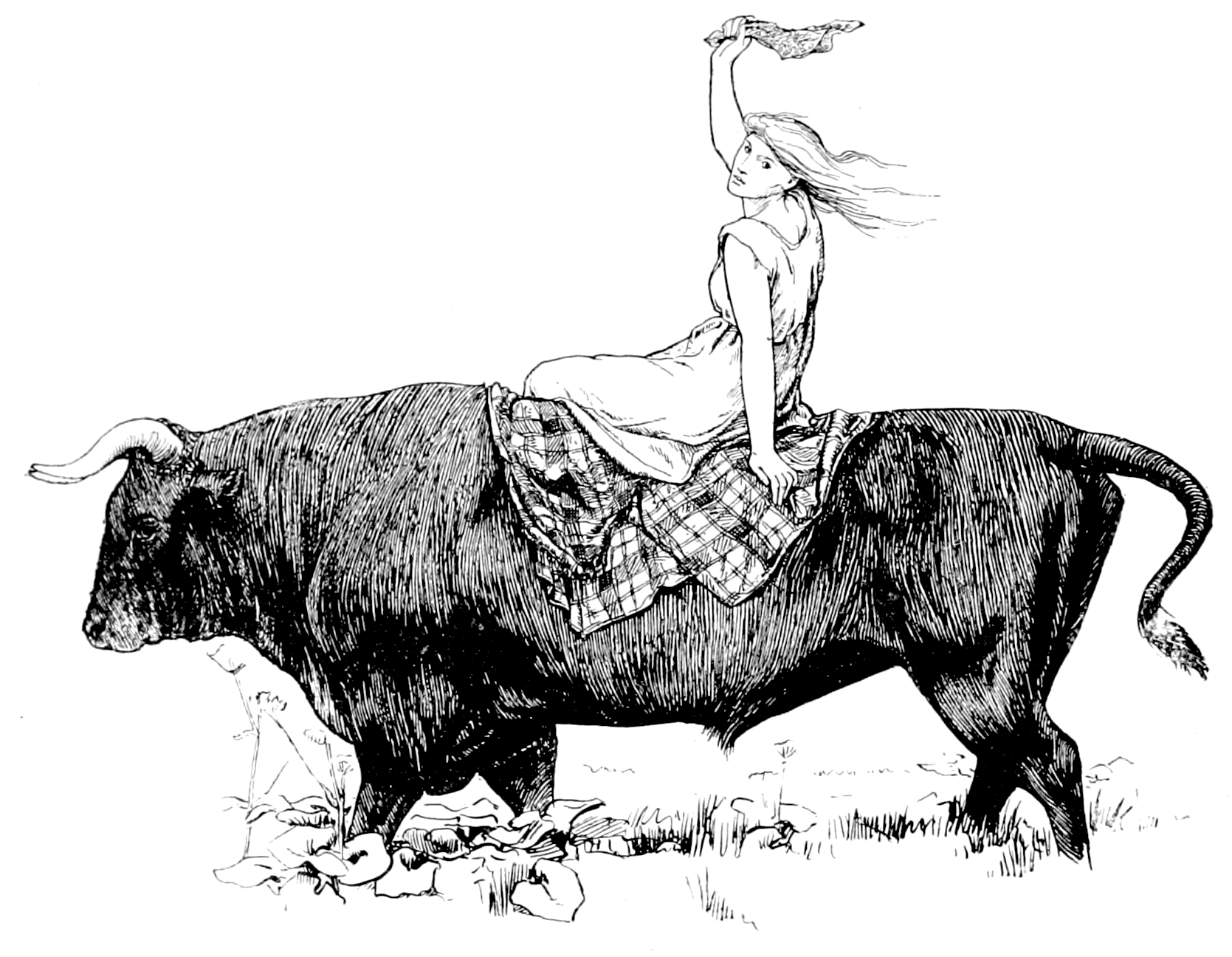
- The maiden on the bull's back. Illustration from More English Fairy Tales by John D. Batten (1894).

Folk tale
- Name: The Black Bull of Norroway
- Aarne–Thompson grouping: ATU 425A, "The Animal (Monster) as Bridegroom"
- Country: Scotland
- Published in: More English Fairy Tales, by Joseph Jacobs (1894)

"The Black Bull of Norroway" is a fairy tale from Scotland. A version titled "The Black Bull of Norroway" in the 1870 edition of Popular Rhymes of Scotland was reprinted in an Anglicised version by Joseph Jacobs in his 1894 book More English Fairy Tales.

It was included within The Blue Fairy Book by Andrew Lang, English Fairy Tales by Flora Annie Steel, Scottish Folk Tales by Ruth Manning-Sanders, and A Book Of British Fairytales by Alan Garner. J. R. R. Tolkien cited it in the essay "On Fairy-Stories" as the example of a "eucatastrophe".

It is Aarne–Thompson–Uther type 425A, "The Animal (Monster) as Bridegroom". Others of this type include, The Brown Bear of Norway, The Daughter of the Skies, East of the Sun and West of the Moon, The Enchanted Pig, The Tale of the Hoodie, Master Semolina, The Sprig of Rosemary, The Enchanted Snake, and White-Bear-King-Valemon.

== Synopsis ==
A washerwoman's three daughters each in succession ask her to cook them some food to take with them on a journey to seek their fortune. Along their way, they consult a witch on how to seek the fortune. The woman advised them to look out her back door. On the third day, the eldest sees a coach-and-six come for her and leaves with it, delighted; the second daughter finds a coach-and-four and leaves; but the third and youngest finds only a black bull, which the witch tells her she must accompany.

The daughter is terrified but goes off with the bull, who surprises her by being kind and gentle. When she grows hungry, he tells her to eat out of his right ear, and drink out of his left. The first night of their journey, they arrive at a castle, which, the bull tells the girl, belongs to his eldest brother. The daughter is welcomed and treated lavishly. As a parting gift, she is given a beautiful apple and told to never use it until she comes to the first great need of her life, and then it would help her. The second night of the journey, they once more stay at a castle, this one belonging to the bull's second brother. Once more the daughter receives a parting gift: a beautiful pear that she is not to use until the second great need of her life; the third night, they are hosted at the youngest brother's castle, and the daughter is given a final gift of a beautiful plum, not to be used until the third great need of her life. At last, the girl and the bull arrive at a valley of glass.

"You must wait here," the bull tells the girl, "and whatever you do, do not move, even an inch, or I will not be able to find you". He goes on to explain that he is to fight the devil who rules the valley so that they may exit. If the sky turns blue, then she will know that the bull has won; but if the sky turns red, then he has lost. The black bull leaves the girl there, and after some time she sees the sky turn blue. Overjoyed, the girl shifts her position slightly... and so the black bull does not return for her.

Unable to climb out of the valley on her own, the girl wanders alone until she finds a blacksmith. He tells her that if she serves him for seven years, he will repay her by making her a pair of shoes. When seven years have gone by, the blacksmith, true to his word, makes the girl—now a young woman—a pair of iron shoes, and nails them to her feet. With the shoes, the young woman is able to climb out of the glass valley.

The young woman eventually wanders back to the home of the witch, who offers her shelter if she will wash some bloody shirts that both she and her daughter have been unable to clean. Whoever could clean the shirts would marry the gallant young knight staying at the witch's home, whom the shirts belong to. Despite the failure of those before her, no sooner has the young woman touched the soap to the shirts than the bloodstains vanish, and the young woman's feet heal perfectly, as if they had never been bloodied or injured. Delighted, the witch brings the knight his shirts and convinces him that it was her daughter who cleaned them. Thus, the knight and the witch's daughter are to be married.

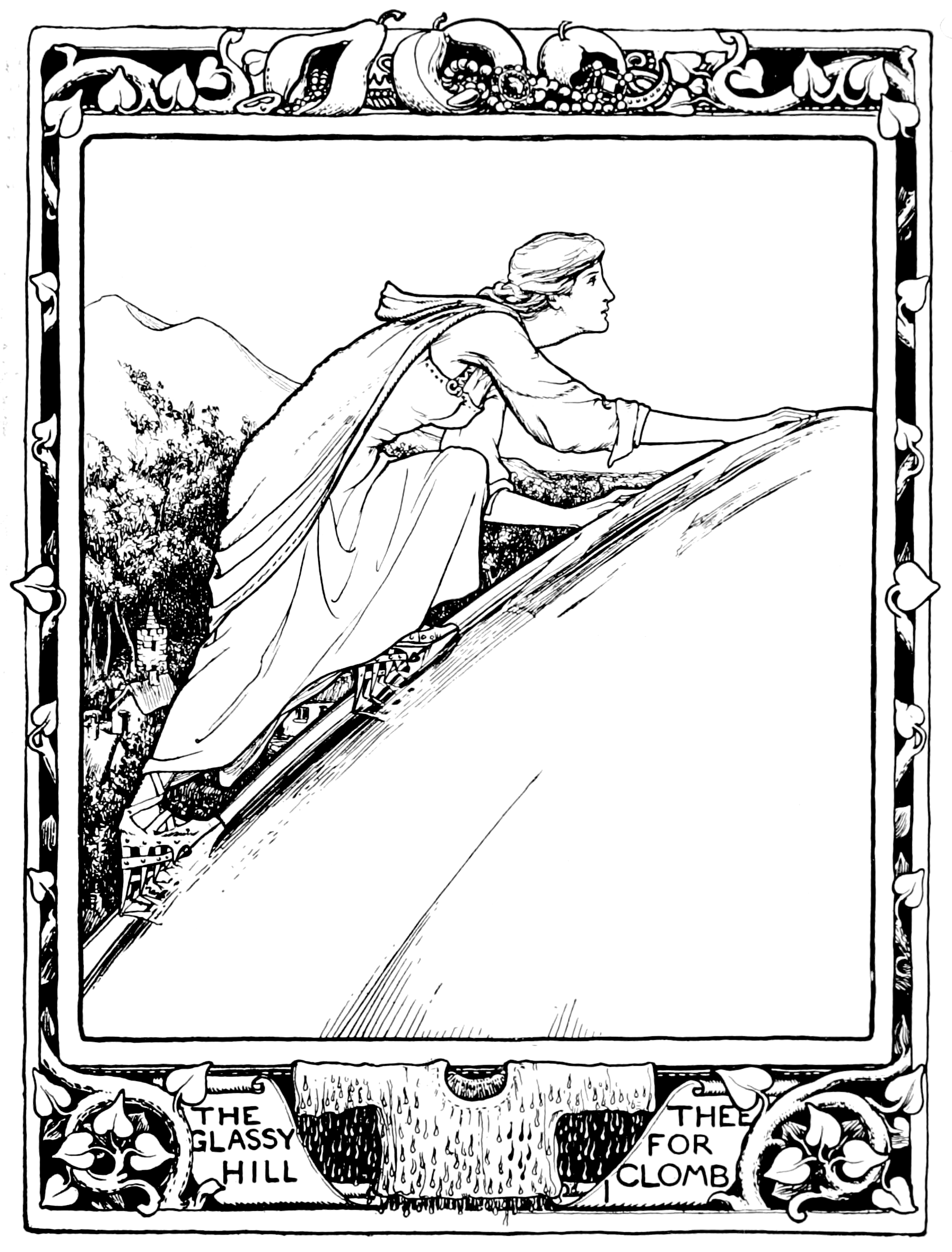
Illustration from More English Fairy Tales, by John D. Batten

Desperate, the young woman realizes that she is in the first great need of her life. She breaks open the apple, and finds it full of rich jewelry. She offers the jewelry to the witch's daughter, in exchange for being allowed to sing outside the knight's room at night. But the witch gives her daughter a sleeping-drink to offer the knight, so the young woman cannot wake him, though she sobs and sings:

"Seven long years I served for thee,
The glassy hill I clamb for thee,
Thy bloody clothes I wrang for thee;
And wilt thou not waken and turn to me?"

She is in the second great need of her life, so she tries the pear, and finds it full of jewelry richer than that of the apple, but the second night goes as before. Finally, the young woman is in the third great need of her life, and breaks the plum to find the richest jewelry yet. This time, though the sleeping-drink is brought again, the knight accidentally knocks it over, so, when the young woman buys her third and final chance, the knight is awake to hear her song. In this way he learns the truth.

The young woman marries the knight, who had been her black bull all along. He has the witch and her daughter burned, and the knight and the washerwoman's youngest daughter live happily ever after.

== Origins ==
English scholar James Orchard Halliwell republished the Scottish tale The Bull of Norroway, in his Popular Rhymes and Nursery Tales, and commented that it was a modern version of the "very old tale" Black Bull of Norroway, mentioned in The Complaynt of Scotland (1548). Similarly, folklorist Joseph Jacobs remarked on its mention in The Complaynt of Scotland and in Philip Sidney's Arcadia.

== Analysis ==
=== Tale type ===
The tale is classified in the international Aarne-Thompson-Uther Index as type ATU 425A, "The Animal as Bridegroom". In this tale type, the heroine is a human maiden who marries a prince that is cursed to become an animal of some sort. She betrays his trust and he disappears, prompting a quest for him.

According to Hans-Jörg Uther, the main feature of tale type ATU 425A is "bribing the false bride for three nights with the husband". In fact, when he developed his revision of Aarne-Thompson's system, Uther remarked that an "essential" trait of the tale type ATU 425A was the "wife's quest and gifts" and "nights bought".

=== Motifs ===
According to Jan-Öjvind Swahn's study on some 1,100 variants of Cupid and Psyche and related types, he concluded that variants with the enchanted bull husband may originate from Ireland or Britain.

The chivalric romance Generides features a garment where the lady's tears can only be washed out by the lady herself. Despite the commonplace status of magical shirts in folktales, this particular detail is so unusual as to point as a source in a fairy tale such as this or The Feather of Finist the Falcon.

== Variants ==
=== Europe ===
==== Scotland ====
Robert Chambers published a similar tale in 1842, in his book Popular Rhymes of Scotland. In this tale, titled The Red Bull of Norroway, which he sourced from Dumfriesshire, a king has three daughters, the elder two ugly and the youngest beautiful and kind. One night, they are talking about their marriage wishes: the elder wants to marry a king, the middle one a prince or great duke, and the youngest wishes for the Red Bull o' Norroway. The next morning, the Red Bull appears at the king's door and demands his wife. The king tries to trick the creature with a henwife, but he notices the deception and turns back. The king then sends his servants, and even his elder daughters, until the monarch is forced to surrender his youngest daughter. The Red Bull takes his intended to a lord's castle where they spend the night. In their chambers, the princess notices a pin on the bull's back and removes it; this turns the bull into a prince. Celebrations are held, but the prince suddenly disappears. The princess, then, begins her wanderings through the world until she finds a hut in the dark woods, where an old woman lives. The old woman gives her three nuts, and the princess departs. Still on her journey, the princess spots a wedding procession for the Duke o' Norroway's wedding, who is the prince. The princess follows the wedding procession to the Duke's castle and cracks open each of the nuts: inside, a "wee wifie" carding, a "wee wifie" spinning, and lastly, a "wee wifie" reeling. The princess uses the spinning instruments to bribe the Duke's bride to allow for one night in the Duke's chambers, one night for each item. The princess tries to wake the Duke on the first two nights by singing sorrowful verses, but he does not budge, since he drank a sleeping potion. The next morning, the Duke asks a servant about the singing he hears in his sleep, and his servant tells him about the mysterious girl that comes to his bed at night. On the third night, the Duke avoids drinking the potion and interacts with the princess, his saviour. The Duke and the princess reunite, while the enchantress flees from the country.

Peter Buchan collected a variant of the story, titled The Brown Bull of Ringlewood. In this tale, the King of Coil gives alms to an old beggar man, who, in gratitude, grants the king's three daughters a wish each. Each of the princesses wishes for a husband: the eldest for the King of Westmoreland, and so it happens. Seeing her sister's good fortune, the middle one asks for the King of Southland as her husband and he appears to court her. Lastly, the youngest jokingly wishes for "The Brown Bull of Ringlewood", and a bull appears not too long after to take her. The Brown Bull comes to take the princess as his wife and to take her to his castle. Once there, he takes off the bull skin and becomes a man at night. The princess bears him three sons. Instructed by an old woman, the princess burns the bull skin and the husband tells her they must go to his father's castle, beyond the sea and up a crystal mountain named Hill of Forgetfulness. The princess takes their children and accompanies her husband to the Hill, asking her how she can join him. However, the human Brown Bull asks her to look between her and the sky; by doing so, she sights a castle where she leaves one of her sons. By looking to the east and the west, she spots two other castles where she leaves her other children to be educated and fed. Meanwhile, the human Brown Bull climbs the Hill and forgets about his wife. Abandoned by her husband, she finds work nearby with a local lord, where she serves for seven years before gaining enough provisions to climb the Hill of Forgetfulness. After doing so, she meets an old woman up the Hill, who asks her to fetch three pears from a tree, in return she will give the girl three eggs for her hour of need. The girl plucks the fruits and gives to the old woman, gaining the three eggs. She then takes lodge inside the castle, where she learns the Prince, her husband, is soon to be married. Downcast, the girl cracks open the three eggs, each egg on each day, and produces marvellous objects: a wheel spinning golden yarn from the first egg, a reel spinning gold yearn from the second egg, and a singing bird from the third. She trades the wheel and the reel on the first two days with the local Princess for a night in the Prince's chambers, and tries to wake him, but he is under a spell by a powder and enchanted bedclothes. On the third day, the singing bird tells the girl about the enchanted bedclothes which place her husband under a spell, and removes them. The Prince wakes up and recognizes his true wife, promising to declare his love in a public manner. Soon enough, the Prince places a chair in the middle of the court room, and announces he will take for wife the one who sits on it. Many try and cannot fit, save for his true wife. The Prince and the girl reunite.

==== Ireland ====
In the tale Tarbh Mór na h-Iorbhaig ("The Great Bull of Irvaig"), three princesses talk about their future husbands, and the third says she wants to marry the Great Bull of Irvaig. The bull himself appears the next week and demands the third princess. He takes his wife to their new home and takes off the cochull or bull cowl, and tells her she must not lay a finger on the cowl, nor must reveal that he is a man under the bull skin. A year passes by and she gives birth to a son, who is taken away from her by a huge hand that come down the chimney. The Bull husband assures their son is safe wherever he is. The same fate befalls their second son. When she gives birth to their third son, she visits her relatives and reveals everything about the bull husband. The third son is also taken by the mysterious hand, as the bull husband enters a frenzied state and takes her back to their island palace. He tells the boys are being kept by three giants, gives her a pair of boots and departs. The princess visits the three giants, receives objects to travel a river of fire, a mountain of glass and a mountain of thorns to reach her husband's kingdom. She then meets a princess by the side of a river who tells her the prince will only marry the one who can wash a stain of blood out of his three white shirts. The tale concludes as the princess spends three nights trying to make her husband remember.

Professor Séamus Ó Duilearga collected a tale from a teller named Seán Ó Conaiill, from County Kerry. In his tale, titled Bull Bhalbhae, three princesses use their father's magical wishing mirror to wish for husbands: the elder for the king of the Western World, the middle one for the king of the Eastern World, and the youngest for the Bull Bhalbhae. Their bridegrooms come to take them to their castles. The titular Bull Bhalbhae takes his bride to his castle and asks the princess which form she prefers: she tells him to be a bull by day and a man by night. Time passes, and the princess is sent by the bull to her father's castle to give birth to their first child (a son). After his birth, a hand comes in from somewhere to take the child. This happens again to the second child (another son). When she is pregnant a third time (to a girl), the bull asks her not to cry over the loss of her child. However, seeing that she is to lose a third child as soon as they are born, she cannot hold back tears and cries on her daughter, which is still taken by the hand. The bull disappears and she goes after him. On the road, she stops to rest by three old women's huts; inside each, she sees each of their children, who gives them a pair of scissors, a comb and a skein of thread. The princess finally reaches the underworld, where he husband is being takes hostage by a hag. The princess bribes the hag with her children's gifts, for three nights with her husband. On the third night, her husband, the bull (now in human form) awakes - since he avoided drinking a sleeping draught. They embrace each other and come up with a plan to defeat the hag. The bull prince pretends to be in love with the hag in order to learn the secret of her external soul: located in an egg, inside a duck, inside an ash-tree. The bull prince destroys the hag's external lifeforce and frees himself to live with the princess.

Author Seumas MacManus published an Irish variant titled The Cally Coo-Coo o' The Woods. In this tale, the king and queen of Donegal have a magic Wishing-Chair stashed behind a certain door. While their parents are away, the princesses open the door to the room and sit on the chair: the elder wishes for the richest man in the world for her husband, the middle one for the handsomest man, and the youngest, named Maeve, for the "Cally Coo-Coo O' the Woods", a being she thinks to be merely a repetitive echo in the forest. Their husbands of choice come to take them as their brides and, to Maeve's surprise, the Cally Coo-Coo, a bull, appears to marry her. He takes the princess to a waterfall and builds a makeshift house for them. The bull explains that he is a Prince of the East cursed by a witch to be a man by night and a bull by day. Two years into their marriage, Maeve gives birth to a boy in the first year and a girl in the second. Each time, the bull husband warns her that the children will be taken from her, but she cannot shed a tear over their disappearance. She obeys the first time, but cries for her daughter and hides her tear in a handkerchief. Eventually, Maeve's parents invite their daughters and their husbands. Back at her family's castle, her bull husband is mocked by her sisters and brothers-in-law, to the Queen's consternation. Later at night, the queen discovers Cally Coo-Coo's discarded bullskin and decides to burn it. To everyone's horror, Cally Coo-Coo wakes up screaming and demands to know who burned his calfskin, since he was on the brink of breaking his curse. HE then turns into a crow and flies away. Maeve goes after him through hilltops and valleys, until the crow perches on a tree and tells her to seek shelter in a nearby hut. The princess is greeted by a woman. A boy is also there, playing caman. When she departs, the woman gives Maeve a "Needle of Beauty", capable of turning any piece of cloth into beautiful silk. She continues her journey until another woman's hut; inside, also a little girl, missing one of her eyes. The second woman gives her a Towel of Loveliness, for her to beautify herself, and asks Maeve for her handkerchief to restore the little girl's eye. Further ahead, a third woman gives Maeve a Comb of Plenty, to hang pearls and jewels. Following the crow, she finally arrives at the foot of the Hill of Harrow Pins, unreachable on foot. She finds work for a nearby blacksmith, who, after seven years, fashions her a pair of shoes to climb up the Hill of Harrow Pins and down the Hill of Glass. She traverses both hills and finds a castle near a river. Along the river, a group of women trying to wash the bloodstains from a shirt. Maeve succeeds, but a "coarse, big girl" named Eiver takes the credit and is set to marry the Prince of the East. The next three days, Maeve bribes Eiver and a scullion maid to nurse the prince, one night for each gift. On the third night, the prince awakes and embraces his wife. He banishes Eiver and celebrates a new marriage to Maeve.

In another Irish tale, The Roarin’ Bull of Orange, a king has a wishing chair that he forbids his three daughters to sit on. One day, while he is away, the three princess sit on the chair and make wishes for husbands: the elder asks for the "Rumblin’ Baker", the middle one for the Man from No Man's Land, and the youngest for "The Roarin’ Bull of Orange". The next day, the three men appear at the castle to fetch their respective wives, but on the Roarin’ Bull of Orange's turn, the king tries to trick him with another girl. The Roarin’ Bull of Orange notices the ruse and gets the true princess. The bull takes her to his castle, but the king follows him with his army. The king enters the castle and finds a human asleep on the bed, with a bull's hide inside it. The king burns the bull's hide and goes back home. The next morning, the human Bull of Orange awakes and, not seeing his bull's hide, tells his wife her father ruined them. He then turns into a bird and flies away, and the princess follows after him. After a while, the bird takes her to a castle, where the princess lives and gives birth to three babies in the following years. Each time, however, a bird flies in and takes the child from her; the third baby loses an eye because the princess held on to her so tight. Later, continuing on her quest, the princess meets three old women in three huts, who are taking care of her children, and each give her a gift (a rack in the first, scissors in the second, and a needle in the third). The princess then uses the rack to cross the Red Sea, the scissors to traverse the Glassy Mountain, and the needle to bypass the Fiery Mountain. Finally, she reaches a castle atop a hill, where an old witch lives. The princess uses the scissors, the rack and the needle to bribe the old witch for three nights with her husband, The Roarin’ Bull of Orange. At his bedside, the princess tries to wake him up (she calls him both "Roarin’ Bull of Orange" and "Green Bull of Orange"), but can only wake him on the third night. The Bull of Orange, now human, wakes up and tells the princess he will find out about the witch's external life, so they break the curse once and for all. Naïvely, the witch tells the human Bull of Orange her life is hidden in an egg, in a bird's nest, atop a tree. The Bull of Orange and a servant find the egg and throw it at the witch's forehead, killing her and undoing her enchantments.

In a variant from County Leitrim, The Glass Mountains, a man enchanted into bull form marries a human wife, and she tells him she prefers for him to be human during the night. He also tells her that, whenever she gives birth, she must not shed a tear to whatever happens to their child. Just as his husband promised, a black dog comes down the chimney and takes the child from her - this happens to her first two sons. When she gives birth to a daughter and the black dog comes, the wife sheds a tear and her husband disappears. She goes in search for him. She finds a cottage with an old couple and a little boy (her son). She spends the night and when she is leaving the boy gives her a comb. This happens again in the next house, and her second son gives her a pair of scissors. The maiden arrives at last at the foot of the titular Glass Mountain, where lies another house with an elderly couple with her daughter. The third old man tells her that her husband is married to another woman and they live at the castle atop the Glass Mountain. Her daughter gives her an egg and she departs to climb the mountain. She asks for shelter at the castle and buys her place at her husband's bed with the gifts her children gave her.

Mabel Peacock wrote down another variant of The Glass Mountain from County Leitrim, which she claimed was "imperfect" and told to her when she was a child. In this version, a woman lived with her three daughters in a cottage. A man comes and asks for night lodgings. The matriarch relents and gives him shelter. The next day, the man asks for the hand of the youngest daughter in marriage. They marry and go to his castle, where he asks her which form she prefers: for him to be a bull or man during each time of the day. She prefers for him to be a man by night. Three children are born, and she wishes to visit her mother. She reveals the strange nature of her husband, he disappears and she seeks him with her children. However, Mabel Peacock noted that the tale, as given to her, was "defective", but she noted down the song the maiden sings to her sleeping husband to jog his memory, referring to him as the "Bare bull of Orange".

=== Americas ===
==== United States ====
In a variant from New England, The Three Maids who Went to Seek Their Fortunes, three girls went about the world to look for their fortunes. They stop at a crossroads and go their separate ways. After some walking, she looks despondent for having accomplished nothing that day, and a witch gives her an egg, telling her to break it should the need arise. She walks a bit more and reaches a fountain where washerwomen were trying to wash a handkerchief with blood on it, because, should one of them do it, they would marry the prince. The girl tries and accomplishes it. She marries the prince and discovers he becomes a bull by day, human by night. He must suffer the enchantment for seven years. By the end of this period, he regains human form.

In a tale from the Wisconsin Chippewa, collected in 1944 in Lac du Flambeau, from teller Maggie Christensen and titled The Girl Who Married an Ox, an old woman lives with her three daughters. One day, an ox appears in their house and declares he wants to marry one of the woman's daughters. Only the youngest agrees to marry him. He becomes human and tells her that he must suffer his curse for 20 years. They have a son, but his wife eventually betrays his secret. She goes after him and, on her journey, gains a comb. She finally arrives at another kingdom, where her husband, now human, is set to marry a queen. The queen sees the comb and wants to trade it, but the girl asks for a night with the man. The husband drinks a cup of a potion and falls asleep. The next night, the girl wakes her husband and he recognizes her.

American folklorist Leonard W. Roberts collected a tale from a Kentucky teller. In this tale, titled Bully Bornes, a rich man has three daughters, Kate, Sally and Judy. One day, he finds in an antique shop a "Wishing Chair" and brings it home. When their daughters see it, they each sit and make a wish for a husband: Kate asks for the most handsome man, Sally for the ugliest man, and Judy for Bully Bornes, the prize fighter. Their wishes come true and their husbands come to marry them. Bully Bornes appears last and demands Judy. The girls' father sends a kitchen maid, but Bully notices the deception and insists on getting Judy. Judy is given to Bully and they marry. They have three children in the next years and, after each birth, Bully orders her not to cry if anything happens to their baby, otherwise he will abandon her. Each time, a bulldog appears and takes the child away from her. The third time, Judy cries over her lost child, Bully Bornes packs up his things and leaves. Judy goes after him: he visits his each of his sisters for the next three years, and so does Judy. At last, after a round of prize fighting, Bully Bornes soils his shirt with drops of his blood and declares he shall marry the woman that can wash it off. Many women queue up to wash it, his wife Judy included. Judy manages to accomplish it, but another girl steals the credit for it and marries Bully. Judy goes after the couple and asks the girl to see Bully Bornes for one night. The woman allows it, but gives Bully a coffee laced with sleeping powder. For two nights, Judy cannot awake him. On the third day, an old man - Bully's tenant - tells him about someone coming at night to see him. The third night, Bully does not drink the potion and recognizes Judy. They go back home and take their children back.

Roberts collected a tale from Cumberland Gap with the title The Pretty Girl and Her Lost Children. In this tale, three girls live together: a cook, a cleaning lady and Pretty Girl. One day, they go to bathe and comment who they wish to appear when they come home. The cook wishes for the "purtiest" man in the world, the cleaner for the ugliest man and Pretty Girl for Bully Bornes. When the girls come home, the men they wished for come to their house. Pretty Girl's parents, however, refuse to let their daughter go with Bully Bornes, so they replace her for the maidservants. Twice, Bully Bornes discovers the ruse, then goes back a third time for his true intended. Bully Bornes and Pretty Girl live together for three years and have three children (three girls), but he eventually abandons her and leaves her with their children. While living alone, Pretty Girl sees an old black dog come and take her children, one each time. After the third time, she follows the dog and reaches an old woman's house, where she sees her eldest daughter. The old woman gives her a ball of yarn. Next, she reaches another woman's house where her second child is, and is given an egg. Lastly, she reaches a third house with her third child and a third woman, who gives her an apple. Later, Pretty Girl goes to see Bully Bornes fight against an opponent. During the fight, three drops of his blood fall on his shirt, and, after the fight, he announces he will marry the girl who can wash it. Pretty Girl washes it, but another girl steals the credit and shows it to Bully Bornes, who declares he will marry her. Pretty Girl cracks open the women's gifts and finds three pictures: one of a woman carding silk, a second with a woman spinning silk and the third with a woman weaving silk. She uses the pictures to bribe the false bride for three nights with Bully Bornes. After two nights where he was given a spoon of lodma, Pretty Girl wakes him up on the third night and they return home to their children. Roberts sourced the tale from an informant named Fae Chadwell Gibson, in Knox County, Kentucky, who learned it from her grandmother.

==== Canada ====
In a tale from Newfoundland from teller Alice Lannon, titled The Big Black Bull of Hollow Tree, three sisters, Dinah, Marie and Kitty, live with their grandmother, who forbids them from entering a certain part of the garden. They disobey her orders and find there a wishing chair and make their wishes for a husband: Dinah and Marie wish for "nice young men", while Kitty wants to marry "The Big Black Bull of Hollow Tree". Some time later, during a celebration, a big black bull appears to take Kitty as his wife. The girl relents and goes with him. He takes off his bull skin and becomes a man, and tells his wife not to tell anyone. After some time into their marriage, Kitty's grandmother sees her granddaughter in the arms of the man, while his bull skin lay strewn in the floor near the bed. The old woman takes the skin and burns it. The husband vanishes and Kitty goes after him. On the way, she finds three houses, each with a young woman inside and some children playing. In each of the houses, Kitty notices a particular child that look like either her daughter or one of her sons. Kitty receives a ball, a table cloth and shears. She later finds her husband, the (now human) Black Bull under the power of an old witch. She uses the table-cloth and shears to trade two nights with her husband, but the old witch gives him a sleeping potion during the first two nights.

==== West Indies ====
Martha Warren Beckwith collected a Jamaican variant titled Bull-of-all-the-Land, wherein the titular Bull-of-all-the-Land is a man named King Henry, who is a man at night and a bull by day when he wears his bull skin. His wife burns the bull skin and he disappears. She bleeds three drops of blood in a white shirt. She wears three pairs of shoes and goes to a riverside, where she meets a washerwoman. The washerwoman washes the blood-soaked shirt and goes to King Henry. The maiden is taken to King Henry's palace, and tries to talk to her husband. On the last night, she sings in his ear his name, "Bull-of-all-the-Land", since no one in his realm knows that name.

=== Other publications ===
Mrs. Caroline Alathea Creevey, in her autobiography, published a version she claimed she heard in her childhood from a Julia Congden, her mother's hired girl. In her tale, The Brown Bull of Orange, once there was a stile that granted wishes. Three sisters pass by it, the oldest wishes for the Prince of Spain and the middle one for the Duke of Algiers as their respective husbands. The youngest, not believing in its powers, mockingly wishes for the brown bull of Orange to appear and take her. The Prince and the Duke appear and make her sisters their wives. At last, a brown bull appears at her father's doorstep. The third daughter tries to dismiss the bull and her silly wishes, but the bull will not yield. She finally agrees to with the animal. The brown bull takes her to his palace and attends her with kindness. She eventually warms up to him and is asked by him if she loves him. She answers positively and the bull becomes a man, the King of Orange and Castile. He explains that a magician turned him into a bull and that he could only turn back into human form if he could find a girl to love him.

Mabel Peacock noted another tale inserted in Mary Hallock Foote's tale, The Last Assembly Ball, published in The Century Magazine. In this version, a king has six daughters and a magical wishing-chair on a dais. Every daughter sits on the chair and makes her wish. When it is the youngest's turn, she wishes to be married to the "Roan Bull of Orange". Some time later, the Roan Bull himself appears at the palace and demands the princess. The king tries to substitute his daughter for the daughter of the hen-wife and the daughter of the swineherd. The Roan Bull discovers the ruse by giving his bride-to-be a white wand. He gets his true bride at last and departs with her.

== See also ==
- Cupid and Psyche
- Nix Nought Nothing
- Pintosmalto
- The Feather of Finist the Falcon
- The Singing, Springing Lark
- The Three Princesses of Whiteland
- The Two Kings' Children
- Europa (consort of Zeus)
