= Pintosmalto =

1634 Italian literary fairy tale by Giambattista Basile

Pintosmalto or Pinto Smauto is an Italian literary fairy tale written by Giambattista Basile in his 1634 work, the Pentamerone.

Italo Calvino included a variant from oral tradition, The Handmade King, based on two tales from Calabria. He noted that variants are also found in Naples, Abruzzo, and Sicily.

It is Aarne-Thompson type 425, the search for the lost bridegroom, in an unusual variation, involving motifs similar to Pygmalion and Galatea.

== Translations ==
Nancy Canepa translated the tale as Splendid Shine and as Pretty as a Picture, although she stated that the literal meaning of the title is "painted enamel". Armando Maggi also translated the title as Enamel painted.

== Synopsis ==
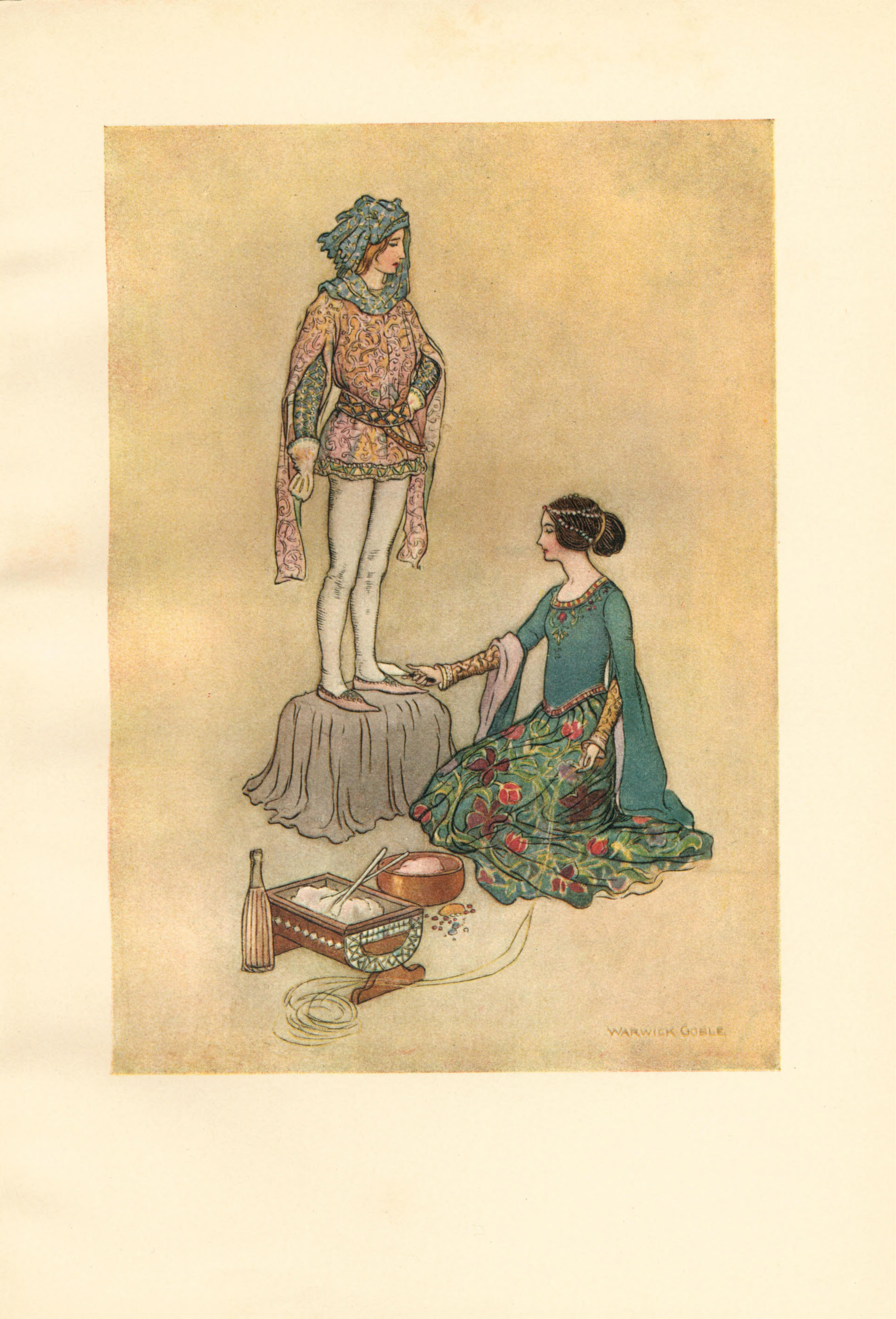
Betta creates the perfect man with raw materials. Illustration from Stories from the Pentamerone (1911, Macmillan).

A merchant's daughter, Betta, continually refused to marry. One day, he asked her what she wanted him to bring her after a journey. She asked for large amounts of sugar and sweet almonds, scented water, musk and amber, various jewels, gold thread, and above all a trough and a silver trowel. Extravagant though it was, he brought it.

She took it and made a statue of it, and prayed to the Goddess of Love, and the statue became a living man. She took him to her father and told him she wished to marry him. At the wedding feast, a queen fell in love with Pintosmalto, and because he was still innocent, tricked him into coming with her. When Betta could not find him, she set out. An old woman sheltered her for a night and taught her three sayings to use. Betta went on, and found the city Round Mount, where the queen kept Pintosmalto. She used the first of the sayings; it conjured up a jeweled coach, and she bribed the queen to let her spend the night at Pintosmalto's door. The queen drugged Pintosmalto into sleep that night. Betta's pleadings went unheard. She used the second; it conjured up a golden cage with a singing bird of jewels and gold, and it went with it as with the coach.

The next day, Pintosmalto went to the garden, and a cobbler who lived nearby and had heard everything told him about the lamenting woman. Betta used the third saying, which conjured up marvelous clothes, and won her a third night. Pintosmalto roused at her account of her sufferings and how she had made him; he took everything the queen had taken from Betta, and some jewels and money in recompense for her injuries, and they fled to her father's home.

== Analysis ==
=== Tale type ===
Philologist Gianfranco D'Aronco classified the tale as Italian type 425, Lo sposo scomparso ("The Lost Husband"). Renato Aprile, editor of the Italian Catalogue of Tales of Magic, sourced the tale from Campania and classified it as part of the "Amor e Psiche" cycle (type 425), but as subtype 425A*, a specific subtype involving an artificial husband made by the heroine and the heroine's rescue of her husband by bribing the false bride for three nights.

Although the tale is classified as the more general type ATU 425, "The Search for the Lost Husband", the tale pertains to a cycle of stories found in Italy, Greece and Turkey: the heroine, refusing to marry any suitor chosen for her, decides to fashion her own husband out of materials, and prays to a deity for him to come alive. In this story, the heroine's handmade husband is not an animal or a creature, and the heroine loses him not by her own actions; he is simply kidnapped.

== Variants ==
=== Italy ===
In Calvino's version, the heroine is a princess, not a merchant's daughter, the king gives her flour and sugar when she declares she will make her own husband if she wishes to marry, and she brings the hero, King Pepper, to life by singing a charm about how she had done various things for six months to make him. She is aided on the journey not by an old woman, but by three hermits, who give her nuts to crack; these produce other objects in gold, which she uses in the same manner.

Letterio Di Francia reported a variant from Abruzzi collected by Finamore with the title La favele de Niccasbarre ("The Tale of Niccasbarre"), wherein the artificial husband is created with flour and sugar. The human princess still has to search for her husband, and is gifted fruits on her way there: a chestnut, a walnut, an orange and a lemon.

Author Giuseppe Bonaviri published a tale titled L'innamorato di miele, translated as The Lover Made of Honey. In this tale, a widowed cobbler called Jacob has a daughter named Granata, who, one day, asks her father to buy her a hundredweight of sugar, honey and flour, for she will lock herself up for a year, a month and a day in order to make herself a lover. After the appointed time, she fashions a puppet she leaves in the sun to dry, then blows the breath of life into him, and he becomes a human prince. Some time later, a gypsy caravan passes by the city, and a gypsy woman sees the handsome puppet and admires its beauty, but she slips off. In her rage, she curses Granata that she will not find her lover after seven years and after wearing down seven pairs of iron shoes. Worried, Granata tells her father the gypsy woman's curse and commissions him the special shoes. She wanders through lands until she crosses the Dead Sea and meets three monks, to whom she tells the reason for her journey. The monks, in response, each give her a hazel nut, an almond and a walnut. She continues on until she reaches a large city, then cracks open the walnut, revealing a gold loom inside. She begins to announce she has a gold loom, and the local queen learns of this. Wanting to own the loom, the queen sends for Granata, who finds her lover Sion, made of sugar and honey, has been adopted by the queen, and trades the loom for a night with Sion. The queen, suspecting something, orders a lady-in-waiting named Mafalda to give an opium drink to Sion, so that he cannot react to Granata's pleas. The girl tries to wake him up on the first night, to no avail, then cracks open the almond (which reveals a golden spindle) and the hazel nut (which produces a shuttle of gold), trading their contents for two more nights with Sion. On the third night, Sion wakes up and recognizes his wife/creatress, choosing to go with her instead of staying with the queen.

=== America ===
Folklorist Ruth Ann Musick collected a variant from West Virginia from a man named Jon De Luca, in Fairmont, who learned from his mother, who learned from her mother. In this tale, titled The Dough Prince, a princess who cannot find any fitting suitor, decides to create her own lover: she mixes dough and shapes it like a human male, to whom she gives life with a kiss. As it happens in other tales, the prince is captured by a foreign queen, and his princess goes after him. She meets an old man who gives her three valuable stones and she trades them with the foreign queen for three nights with the prince.

== See also ==
- Black Bull of Norroway – Scottish fairy tale
- East of the Sun and West of the Moon – Norwegian fairy tale
- Mr Simigdáli – Greek fairy tale
- The Daughter of the Skies – Scottish fairy tale
