= The Daughter of the Skies =

Scottish fairy tale

The Daughter of the Skies (Scottish Gaelic: Nighean Righ nan Speur; English: 'Daughter of the King of the Skies') is a Scottish fairy tale collected by John Francis Campbell in Popular Tales of the West Highlands, listing his informant as James MacLauchlan, a servant from Islay.

It is Aarne-Thompson type 425A. Others of this type include The Black Bull of Norroway, The Brown Bear of Norway, East of the Sun and West of the Moon, The Enchanted Pig, The Tale of the Hoodie, Master Semolina, The Enchanted Snake, The Sprig of Rosemary, and White-Bear-King-Valemon.

== Synopsis ==
A man had daughters, and owned many cattle and sheep, but one day they vanished and he could not find them. A dog offered to find them if a daughter would marry him. The father agreed, if the daughter consented. He asked each of his daughters, and the youngest agreed.

They married, and he took her home and turned into a fine man. They stayed for a time, and she wanted to visit her father. He agreed, as long as she did not stay there until her child, nearly due, was born. She agreed, but stayed too long. Music came in the night, putting everyone else to sleep, and a man came in and took her child. Twice more, she stayed at her father's too long, had a child there, and watched it kidnapped. The third time, her husband warned her first that she would have more difficulty, and, after her father threatened her, if she would not say what she did to the children. She tried to go back to her husband, but her magical horse would not appear, so she set out on foot. There, his mother told her that he had left. She set out and reached a house. There, the housewife told him that her husband was to marry the daughter of the King of the Skies, let her stay the night, gave her shears that would cut on their own, and sent her on to her middle sister. The middle sister gave her a needle that would sew on its own and sent her on to the youngest sister. The youngest sister gave her thread that would thread the needle itself, and keep up with the needle and shears and sent her on to a town.

She found a place to stay with a henwife and asked for something to sew, although the king's daughter was marrying the next day and no one was working. The shears, needle, and thread set to work. A royal serving-maid saw and told the king's daughter, who asked what was wanted for them. The woman asked for leave to sleep where the king's daughter had slept that night. The king's daughter agreed, but gave her bridegroom a sleeping draught and threw the woman out in the morning. The next night, she again exchanged for the needle, and the sleeping drink worked as before, but his oldest son slept beside his father, and heard her tell the sleeping man that she was the mother of his children. The next day, the woman exchanged for the thread, but the man threw out the sleeping drink, and they spoke. When the king's daughter came down to throw the woman out, he said she could go back up, this was his wife.

== Analysis ==
=== Tale type ===
The tale is classified in the international Aarne-Thompson-Uther Index as type ATU 425A, "The Animal as Bridegroom". in this tale type, the heroine is a human maiden who marries a prince that is cursed to become an animal of some sort. She betrays his trust and he disappears, prompting a quest for him.

=== Motifs ===
The motif of the separation of the heroine from her children is located by scholarship across Celtic and Germanic speaking areas.

In his study about Cupid and Psyche and other "animal bridegroom" tales, scholar Jan-Öjvind Swahn surmised that the animal husband appears as a dog in Germanic and Celtic areas.

According to Hans-Jörg Uther, the main feature of tale type ATU 425A is "bribing the false bride for three nights with the husband". In fact, when he developed his revision of Aarne-Thompson's system, Uther remarked that an "essential" trait of the tale type ATU 425A was the "wife's quest and gifts" and "nights bought".

== Variant ==
In a Scottish Gaelic variant, titled Ridire nam Beann 's nan Gleann 's nam Bealach (The Knight of the Glens and Bens and Passes), the titular knight strolls around in his properties and notices his cattle has disappeared. A "White Red-eared Hound" appears and tells the knight he can find the lost cattle, in exchange for marrying one of his daughters. The knight's youngest daughter is the only one to accept the proposal. They marry and live together in his castle. The wife wants to visit her family and give birth to their child under her father's roof, but with the condition she does not reveal his true name. On two occasions, she gives birth to a child, but three nights later "fairy music" begins to play as a "big hand" comes in from under the lintel, takes the child and leaves milk and bread on the cradle. The third time, she gives birth to her third child and reveals the name of her husband: Summer-under-dew. The hand takes the child and leaves nothing in his place, and the husband disappears. She returns to their castle, now empty, and decides to look for him. She reaches the houses of three old women who say her husband passed by them with their three children, and each give a magical object to the knight's daughter: a scissor, a thimble and a needle.

== See also ==
- Bearskin
- The Small-tooth Dog
- The Three Daughters of King O'Hara
- The Singing, Springing Lark
- Pintosmalto
- Sigurd, the King's Son (Icelandic fairy tale)
