= East of the Sun and West of the Moon =

Norwegian fairy tale

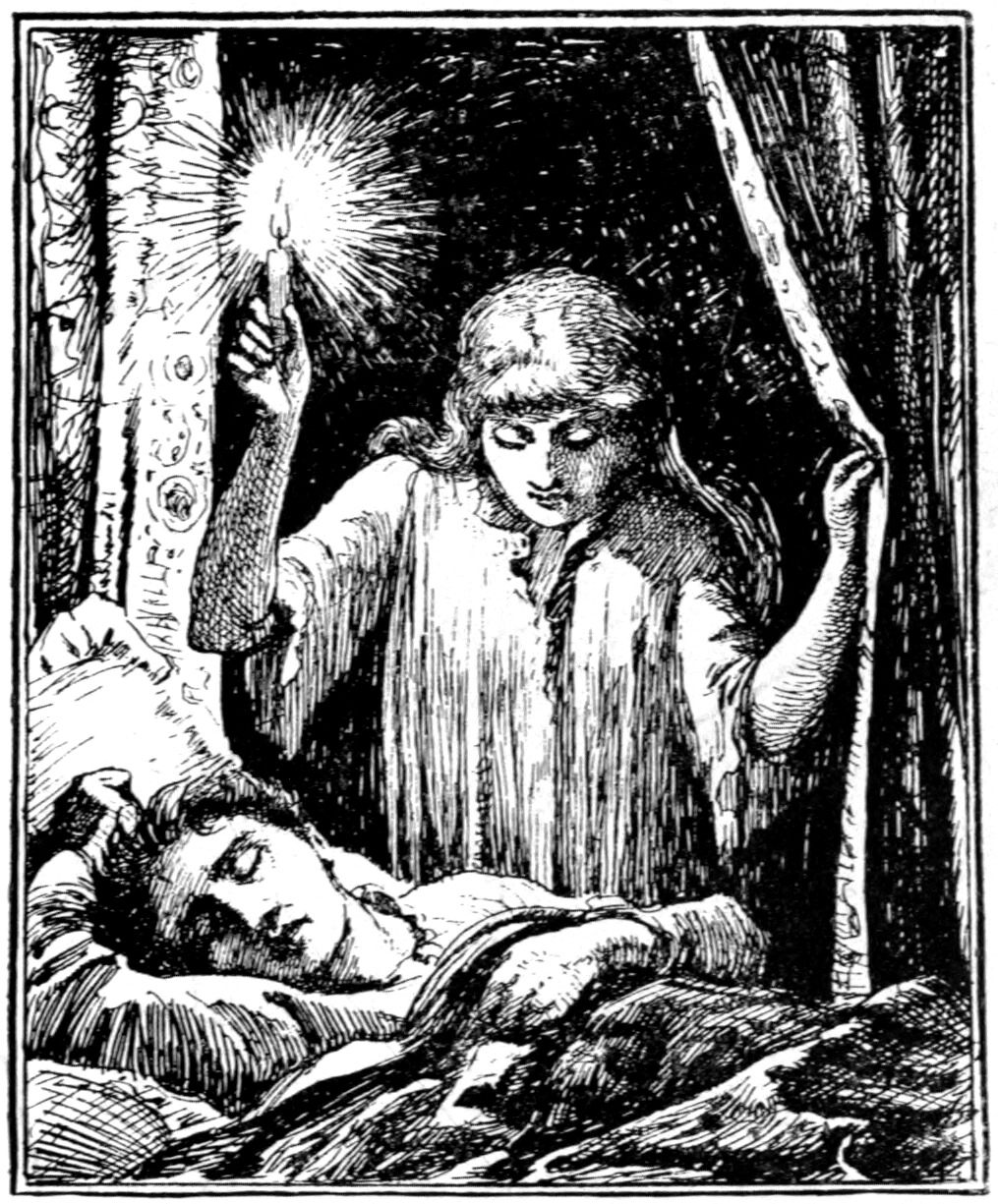
- By candlelight, the heroine discovers the identity of her sleeping husband.

Folk tale
- Name: East of the Sun and West of the Moon
- Also known as: Østenfor sol og vestenfor måne
- Aarne–Thompson grouping: ATU 425A, "The Animal (Monster) as Bridegroom"
- Region: Norway
- Published in: Norske folkeeventyr, by Peter Christen Asbjørnsen and Jørgen Moe
- Related: Cupid and Psyche (ATU 425B); Beauty and the Beast (ATU 425C)

"East of the Sun and West of the Moon" (Norwegian: Østenfor sol og vestenfor måne) is a Norwegian fairy-tale. It was collected by Peter Christen Asbjørnsen and Jørgen Moe, who compiled it from variants they recorded in the regions of Ringerike and Telemark. The tale was first published in 1844 as No. 42 in Norske Folkeeventyr Anden Deel, before being subsequently renumbered as No. 41 in 1852.

"East of the Sun and West of the Moon" was included by Andrew Lang in The Blue Fairy Book (1889). It is related to the cycle of the Animal as Bridegroom or The Search for the Lost Husband, and is classified in the international Aarne-Thompson-Uther Index as tale type ATU 425A, "The Animal (Monster) as Bridegroom". Other tales of this type include "Black Bull of Norroway", "The Brown Bear of Norway", "The Daughter of the Skies", "The Enchanted Pig", "The Tale of the Hoodie", "Master Semolina", "The Sprig of Rosemary", "The Enchanted Snake", and "White-Bear-King-Valemon". The Swedish version is called "Prince Hat Under the Ground". It was likely an offspring from the tale of "Cupid and Psyche" in The Golden Ass, which gave rise to similar animal bridegroom cycles such as "Beauty and the Beast".

== Synopsis ==
A white bear approaches a poor peasant and asks if he will give him his prettiest and youngest daughter; in return, the bear will make the man rich. The girl is reluctant, so the peasant asks the bear to return, and in the meantime, persuades her to marry the bear. The White Bear takes her off to a magnificent enchanted castle. At night, he discards his bear form, and comes to her bed as a man. She never sees him, however, because he enters her bedroom after she extinguishes the light, and leaves before daybreak.

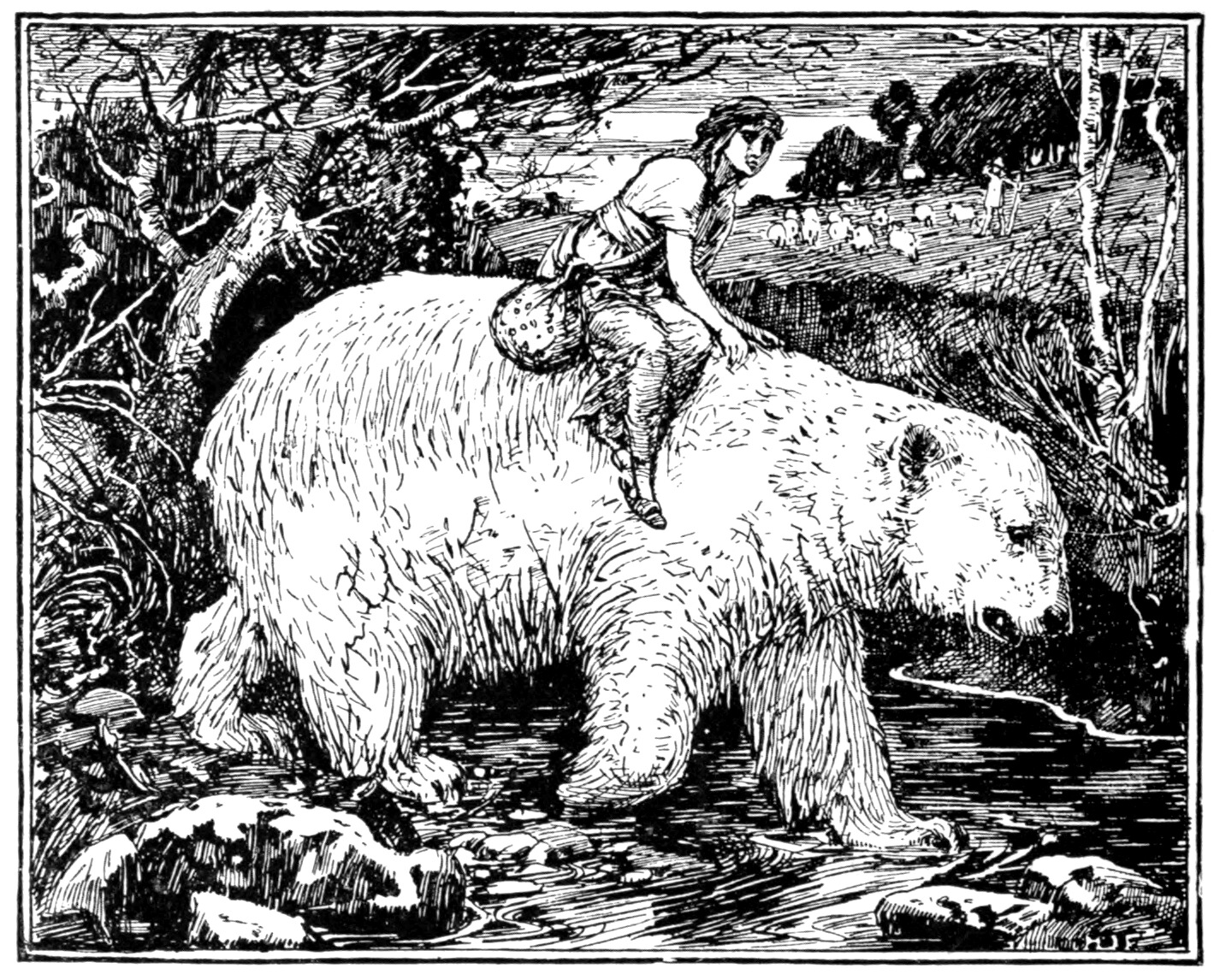
The white bear carries his intended on his back. Illustration from The Blue Fairy Book by Henry Justice Ford.

When she grows homesick, the bear agrees that she might go home as long as she agrees that she will never speak with her mother alone, but only when other people are around. At home, her family welcomes her, and her mother makes persistent attempts to speak with her alone. She finally persuades her daughter to disclose the entire account about the strange man who sleeps beside her in the dark each night, and leaves before daybreak. In response to the girl's story, she insists that the White Bear must really be a troll, gives her a candle, and tells her to light it at night, to see who is sharing her bed, warning her not to spill any tallow.

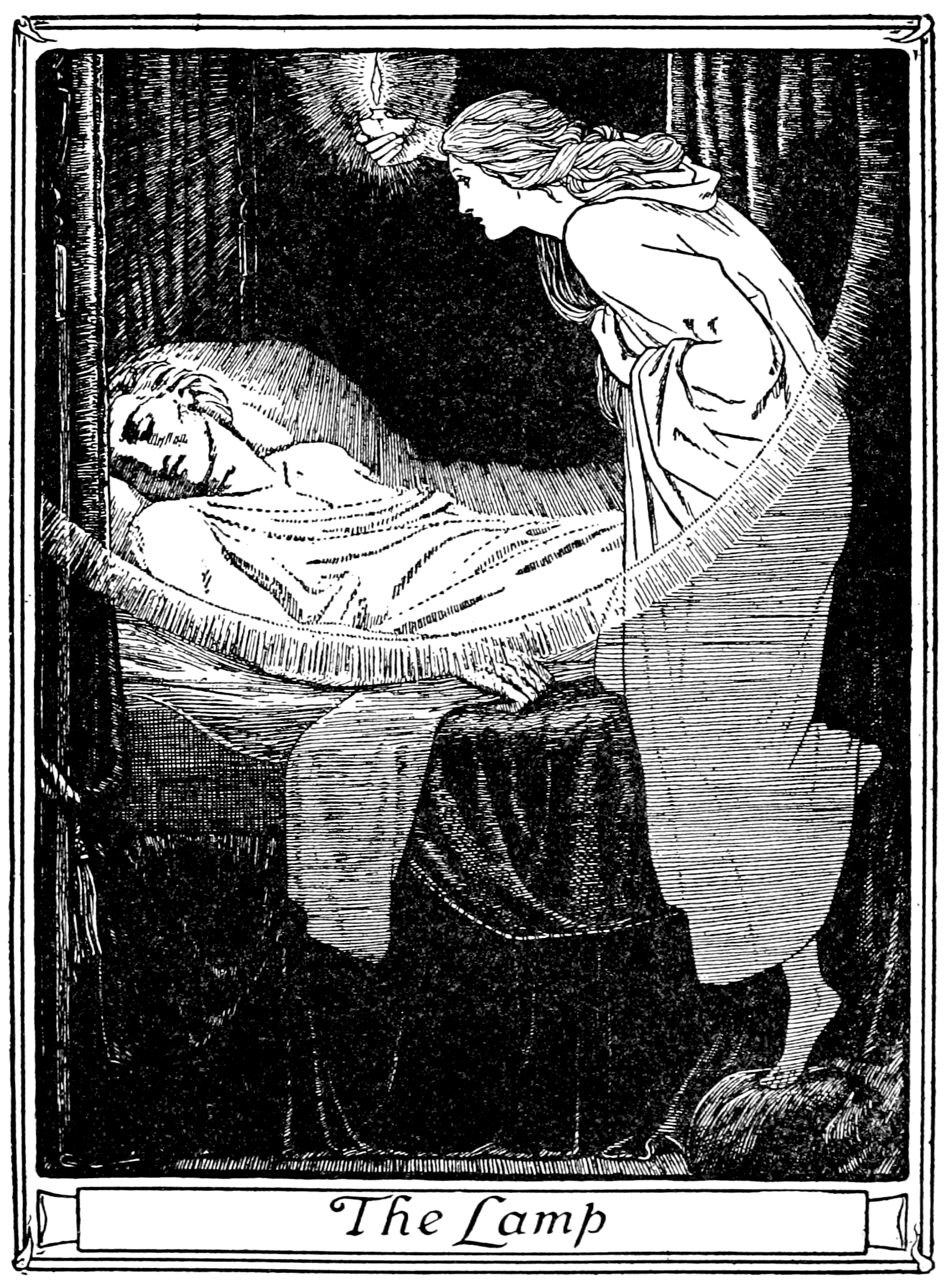
The princess holds up the lamp to take a glimpse at the mysterious prince. Illustration by John Batten for Joseph Jacobs's Europa's Fairy Book (1916).

The girl obeys, and discovers that the bear is actually an attractive prince. Falling in love with him at first sight, she kisses him, and spills three drops of tallow on him. Waking him, thus, she is told that if she had waited for a year, he would have been free, but now he must go to his wicked stepmother, a witch-queen who turned him into his form and lives in a castle that lies "east of the Sun and west of the Moon", and marry her daughter, a witch-princess.

In the morning, the girl finds that the palace has vanished. She sets out in search of the prince. Coming to a great mountain, she finds an old woman playing with a golden apple. She asks the old woman if she knows the way to the castle that lies east of the Sun and west of the Moon. The old woman cannot tell her the way, but lends her a horse to ride to a neighbor who might be able to, and gives her the apple. The neighbor is sitting outside another mountain, with a golden carding comb. She, also, does not know the way to the castle, but lends the girl another horse to ride to another neighbor who might know, and gives her the carding comb. That third old woman does not know the way to the castle either, but lends the girl another horse to ride to the East Wind for advice, and gives her the golden spinning wheel with which she had been working.

The East Wind has never been to the castle that lies east of the Sun and west of the Moon, but believes his stronger brother, the West Wind, might have been there. He takes her to the West Wind, who brings her to the South Wind for the same reason. The South Wind brings her to the North Wind, again, for the same reason. The North Wind says he once exhausted himself blowing an aspen leaf to the girl's desired destination, but would take her there if she was absolutely determined to go. The girl says she is determined, and so he takes her there.

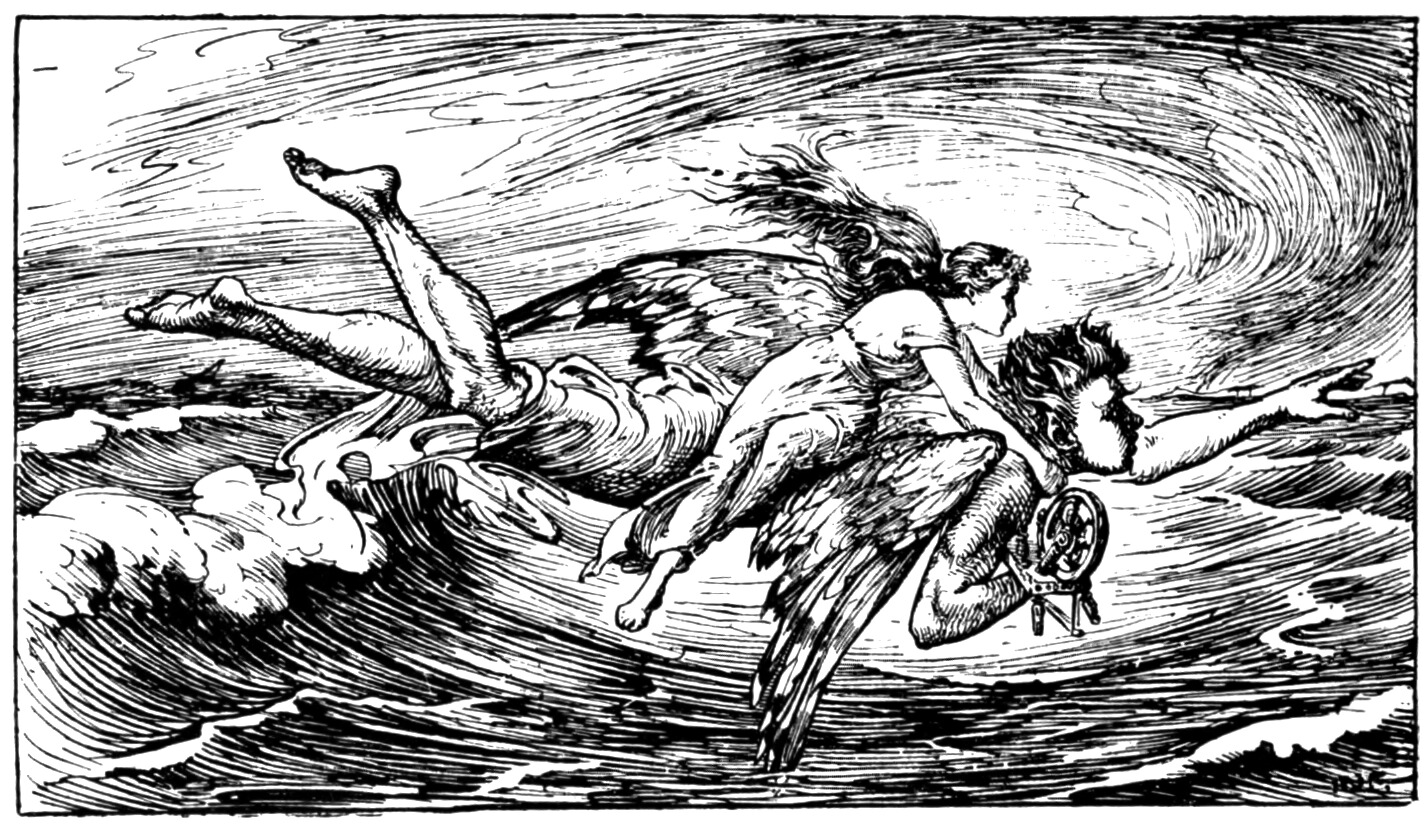
The North Wind carries the maiden across the stormy sea. Illustration from The Blue Fairy Book by Henry Justice Ford.

The morning after her arrival at the witch-queen's castle, the girl starts to play with the golden apple. The witch-queen's daughter, who is betrothed to the prince, sees the golden plaything, and says to the girl that she would like to buy it. The girl agrees to part with it in exchange for a night with the prince. The witch-princess agrees to the exchange, but gives the prince a sleeping drink, so that he cannot be woken up. These events recur the next night, after the girl gives the princess the gold carding comb. This time, the girl's weeping and plaintive utterances, as she attempts to awaken the prince, are overheard by imprisoned townspeople within the castle. They report to him what they had overheard. On the third day, the princess agrees to another night in the prince's bedchamber in exchange for the girl's golden spinning wheel. That night, the prince does not drink the potion that the princess brings him, so he is awake for the girl's visit.

The prince tells her how she can save him: He will declare that he will marry anyone who can wash out the tallow stains from his shirt, since his stepmother and her daughter cannot do it. He would call on the girl for this purpose. When she succeeds, he would claim her for his bride. The plan works out, and rage causes the two witches to explode. The spell is broken, and the prince no longer needs to assume his bear form during the day. He and his bride free the prisoners within the castle, and leave it far behind them with all the gold and silver that had been housed within it.

== Variants ==
=== Finnish-Swedish people ===
Finnish folklorist Oskar Hackman summarized a Finnish-Swedish tale from Vörå. In this tale, a large-nosed woman wants to marry a handsome man, but he rebuffs her. The woman, then, curses him to become a bear. The bear wanders to the forest and finds a hut, where a man lives with his daughter. The animal asks for the man's daughter, in exchange for getting some financial benefits. The bear and the girl live like husband and wife, but he becomes a man at night, and disappears during the day, and she cannot light any candle at home. Eventually, the girl goes back to her father's home and returns with some candles. She lights a candle and sees her bear husband is, in fact, a handsome man. A drop of tallow falls in his shirt, he wakes up and says they must depart. The girl is given a gold spinning wheel and is sent back to her father's hut. The girl decides to go after him and finds him at the house of the large-nosed woman. She tries to sell the spinning wheel for a night with the bear (in human form), but cannot wake him up. On the third night, the girl sells it to the large-nosed woman and wakes him up. The girl and the man decide to play a trick on the large-nosed woman: he will set a challenge for his future bride to wash the tallow spot on his shirt. The large-nosed woman and her maidservants fail, but the girl washes the shirt. For her failure, the large-nosed woman bursts, and the man marries the girl.

=== Russia ===
In a Russian tale from Novgorod Oblast with the title "Муж-медведь" ("Bear Husband"), a poor man has five children, two sons and three daughters, all equally beautiful, but the youngest the most beautiful of the three. Some time later, the father decides to move the family to a hut in another forest. However, a white bear begins to roam around the house, and one day, the animal asks the man if he can marry the youngest daughter, the one the bear fancies the most. The man agrees and gives his youngest to the bear, who takes his intended to his large house. At night, the girl senses someone come to her bed, but cannot see them. One day, she asks the bear if she can visit her relatives. The bear agrees, but warns her not to talk about her domestic life. The girl goes back home and her mother pesters her with questions. The girl eventually yields and tells her mother about the mysterious bedmate, and the woman suggests she lights a candle to better see them at night. The girl returns to the bear's house and follows through with her suggestion. After her bedmate goes to bed, she wakes up, lights the candle and checks on them: it is a handsome youth lying next to her. However, a drop of candlewax falls on his body, and he wakes up with a startle. Feeling betrayed, he admonishes the girl, and says he will depart "to the sun, in the west, and to the moon, in the east" ("к солнцу на запад, к луне на восток", in the original). The youth disappears and the girl goes after him. While walking in the forest, she finds three huts where an old woman lives inside, and gains gifts from each of them: a golden apple in the first; a golden embroidery hoop in the second, and in the third a golden spinning wheel. Finally, the girl reaches the sorceress's castle and stops by a meadow, then draws out the golden objects. The sorceress is drawn to the golden gifts, which the girl trades for three nights with her husband, the bear prince, now in human form. For two nights, the girl cannot wake him up, for the sorceress has given him a sleeping potion, but manages to wake him up on the third, since he avoided drinking the potion. Finally awakened, the bear prince plots with the girl, his true wife, a way to defeat the sorceress: whoever washes the wax stain on his shirt shall have him for husband. The girl agrees to the plan, and both she and the sorceress go to wash it. The sorceress fails, but the girl succeeds, thus marrying the human bear prince as his true wife.

== Analysis ==
=== Tale type ===
The tale is classified – and gives its name – to the more general tale type ATU 425, Østenfor sol og vestenfor måne ("The Search for the Lost Husband") of Ørnulf Hodne's The Types of the Norwegian Folktale. In the international Aarne-Thompson-Uther Index, the story is classified as tale type ATU 425A, "The Animal as Bridegroom", a subtype of ATU 425, "The Search for the Lost Husband". In this tale type, the heroine is a human maiden who marries a prince that is cursed to become an animal of some sort. She betrays his trust and he disappears, prompting a quest for him. To atone, she must wear down a numbered pair of metal shoes. On her way to her husband, she asks for the help of the Sun, the Moon and the Wind.

=== Motifs ===
According to Hans-Jörg Uther, the main feature of tale type ATU 425A is "bribing the false bride for three nights with the husband". (Note: A similar assessment was made by scholar Andreas John: "The episode of 'buying three nights' in order to recover a spouse is more commonly developed in tales about female heroines who search for their husbands (AT 425, 430, and 432) ...")

According to Jan-Öjvind Swahn's study on some 1,100 variants of Cupid and Psyche and related types, he concluded that the bear is the "most usual" form of the supernatural husband in Germanic and Slavonic areas.

== Retellings and translations into English ==
- Eastward of the Sun, and Westward of the Moon, 1849, by Anthony R. Montalba, in Fairy Tales From all Nations. London: Chapman and Hall, 1849.
- East o' the Sun & West o' the Moon, translated by G. W. Dasent in Popular Tales from the Norse (1858)
- The Mysterious Prince, 1908, by Wilbur Herschel Williams, in Fairy Tales From Folk Lore. New York: Moffat, Yard & Company, 1908.
- "East o' the Sun & West o' the Moon" in Norse fairy tales: selected & adapted from the translations by Sir George Webbe Dasent (1910), illustrated by the brothers Reginald L. Knowles and Horace J. Knowles.
- East of the Sun & West of the Moon, translation by G. W. Dasent, illustrated by Kay Nielsen. (1914)
- "East of the Sun and West of the Moon", The Dancing Bears, 1954, by W. S. Merwin
- East of the Sun and West of the Moon retold by Kathleen and Michael Hague and illustrated by Michael Hague (Harcourt Brace Jovanovich, 1980) ISBN 0-15-224703-3.
- East of the Sun & West of the Moon, 1980, written and illustrated by Mercer Mayer
- East of the Sun, West of the Moon, by D. J. MacHale, illustrated by Vivienne Flesher (Rabbit Ears Productions).
- East o' the Sun & West o' the Moon, translated by G. W. Dasent, illustrated by P. J. Lynch. (1992)
- East of the Sun & West of the Moon, 1994, play by Tina Howe.
- East of the Sun, West of the Moon. Adapted by Anthony Ravenhall for the stage: Cleveland Theatre Company (CTC) in 1994. Directed by Anthony Ravenhall, toured Christmas 1994/5. Also toured 1996/97 Northumberland Theatre Company (NTC).
- Once Upon a Winter's Night, 2001, by Dennis L. McKiernan
- East, 2003, novel by Edith Pattou.
- Sun and Moon, Ice and Snow, 2009, by Jessica Day George
- Ice, 2009, novel by Sarah Beth Durst.
- Enchanted: East of the sun, West of the moon, by Nancy Madore.
- East of the Sun, West of the Moon, 2013, written and illustrated by Jackie Morris.
- A Court of Thorns and Roses, 2015, by Sarah J. Maas.
- A Bear's Bride (Entwined Tales, #3), 2018, novel by Shari L. Tapscott.
- Echo North, 2019, novel by Joanna Ruth Meyer.
- Beautiful, 2019, audiobook by Juliet Marillier.
- "Prince Hat Underground," in White Cat, Black Dog (2023), short story collection by Kelly Link, illustrated by Shaun Tan.
- Angelica and the Bear Prince, 2025, graphic novel by Trung Le Nguyen

=== Film adaptations ===
- In the early 1980s, Don Bluth Productions began work on an animated feature film entitled East of the Sun and West of the Moon. Ultimately, the film was never made due to a loss of financial backing, even though the film was heavily into production at the time of its cancellation.
- Max von Sydow narrates the Rabbit Ears Productions' version of "East of the Sun and West of the Moon" to musical accompaniment by Lyle Mays.
- The Storyteller features the episode "The True Bride", which was directly based on a German folktale of the same name, but references this story in its ending. The heroine's love is bewitched by a female troll into forgetting her, but the prince is told the truth by the troll's prisoners. In the episode "Hans My Hedgehog" the husband also turns from a beast into a human.
- The themes of "East of the Sun and West of the Moon" appear in the 1991 film The Polar Bear King, also known as Kvitebjørn Kong Valemon. The story of the film is almost an exact parallel to the fairy tale.
- The 2024 Norwegian animated film, The Polar Bear Prince, is based on the fairy tale of the same name.

== Illustrations by Kay Nielsen (1914) ==
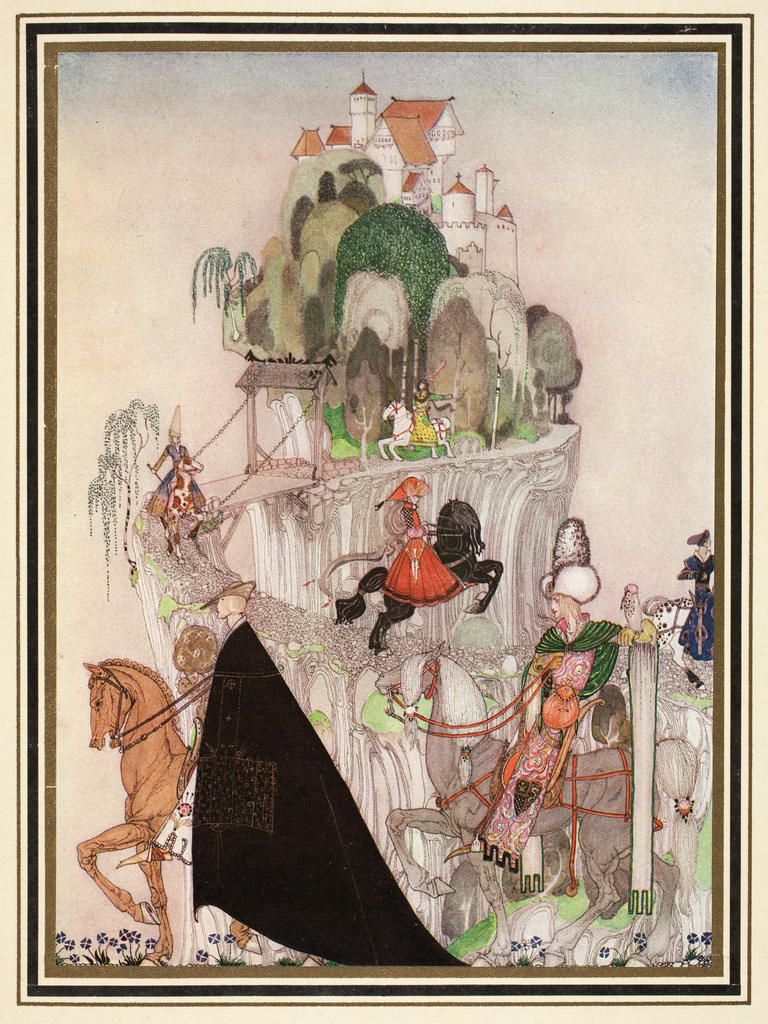

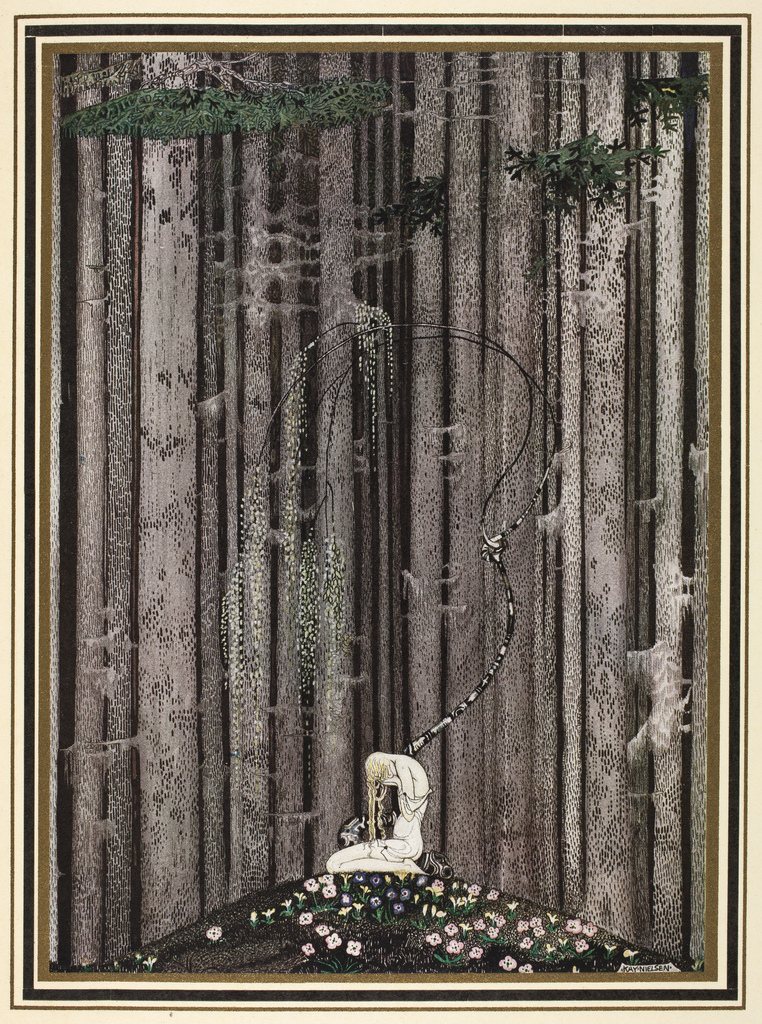

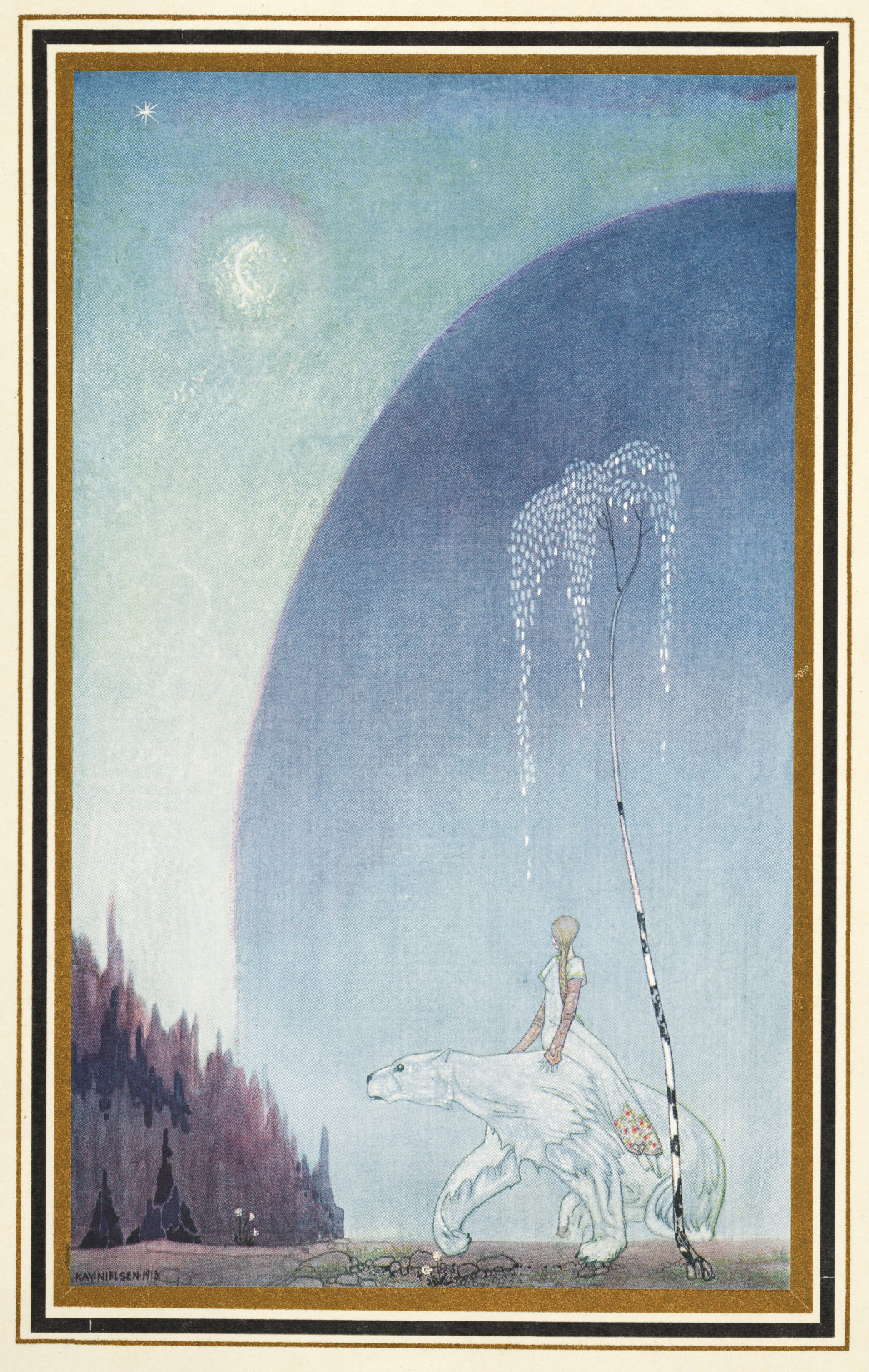

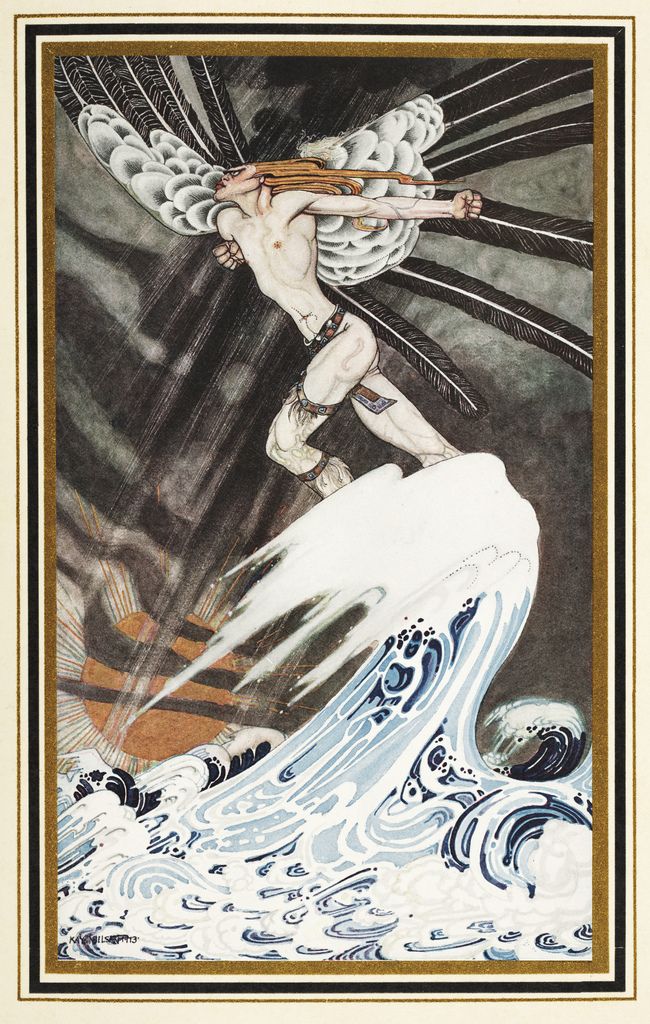

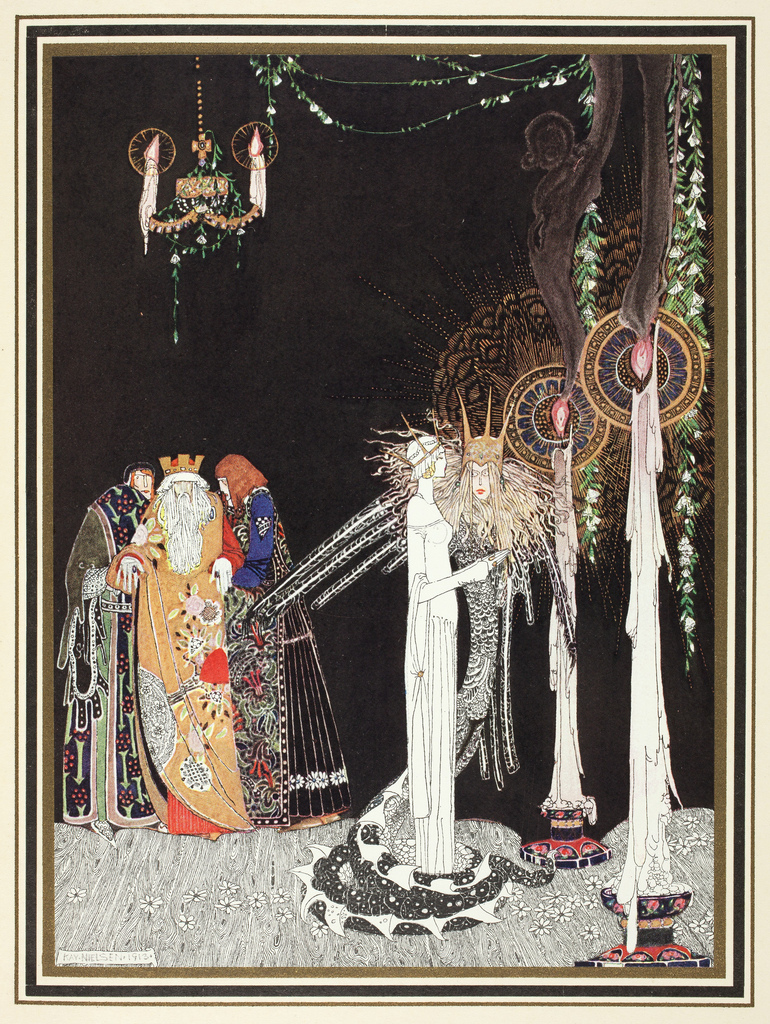

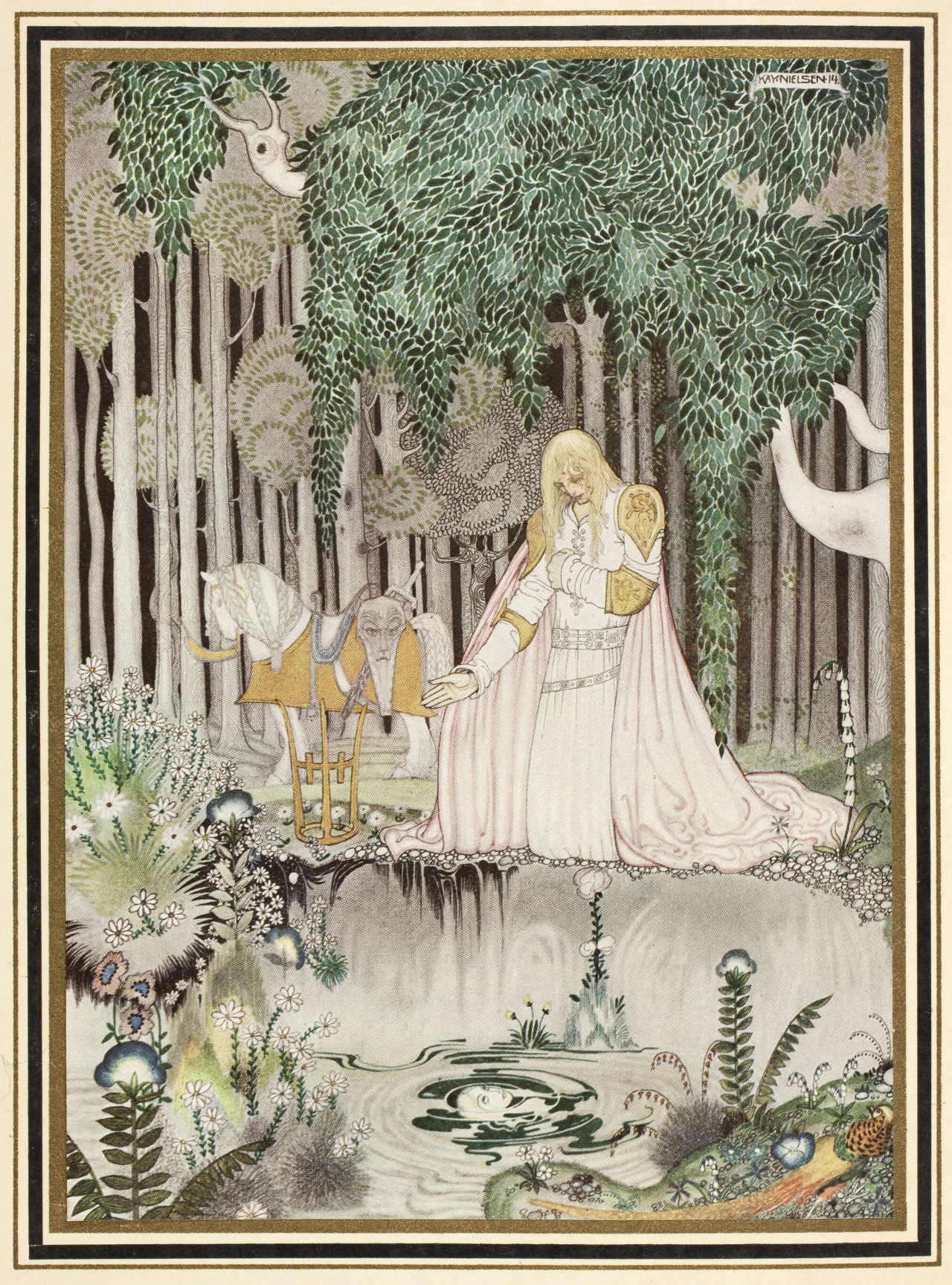

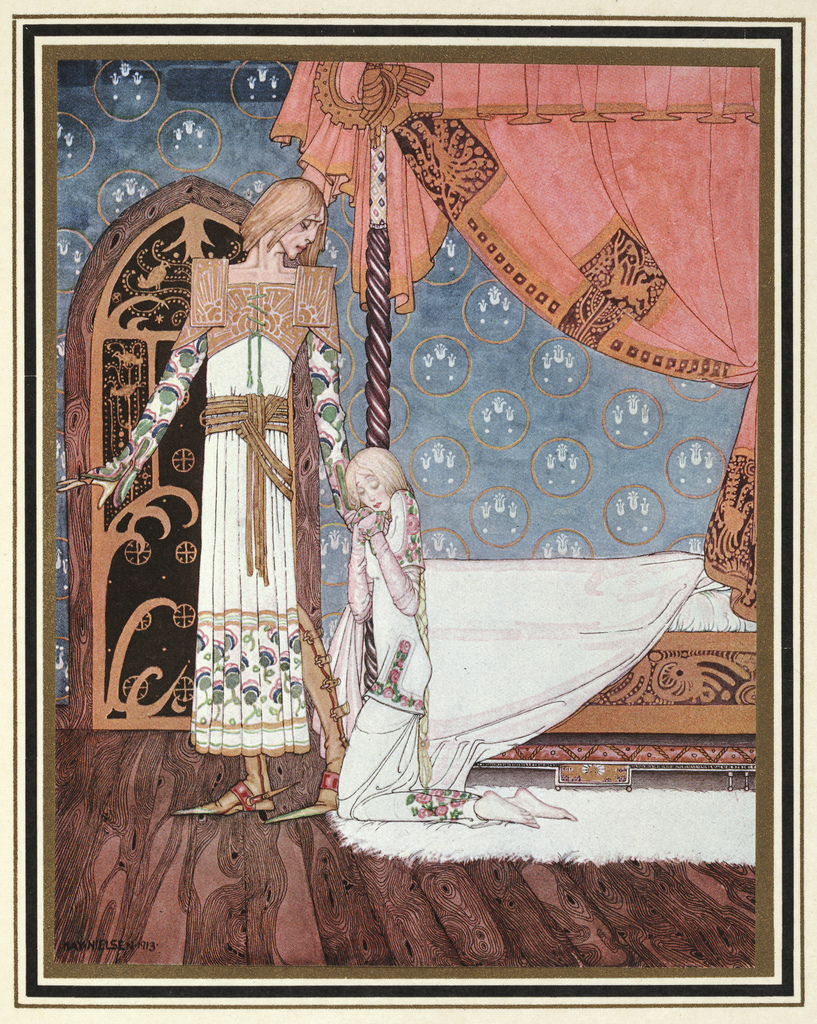

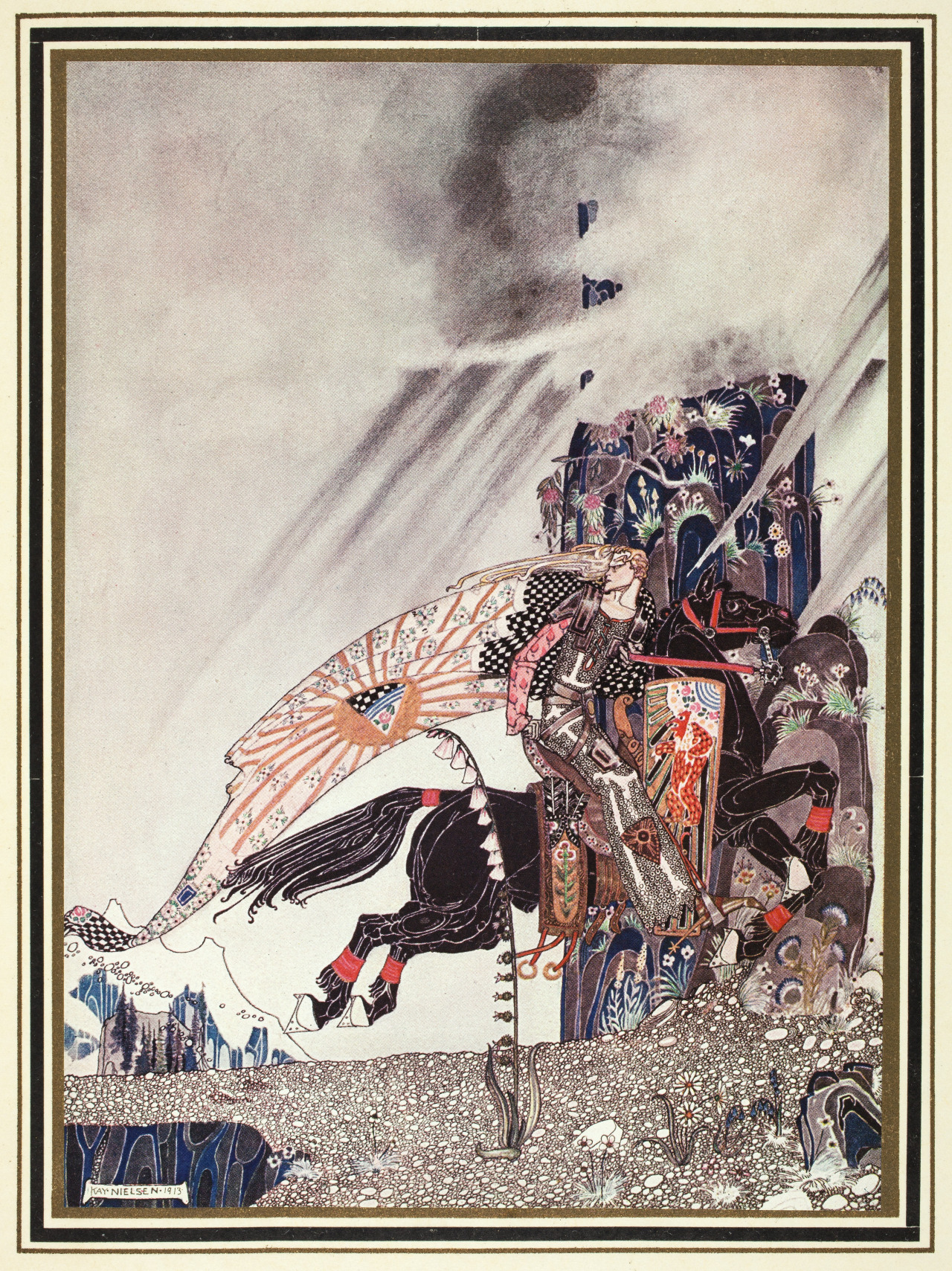

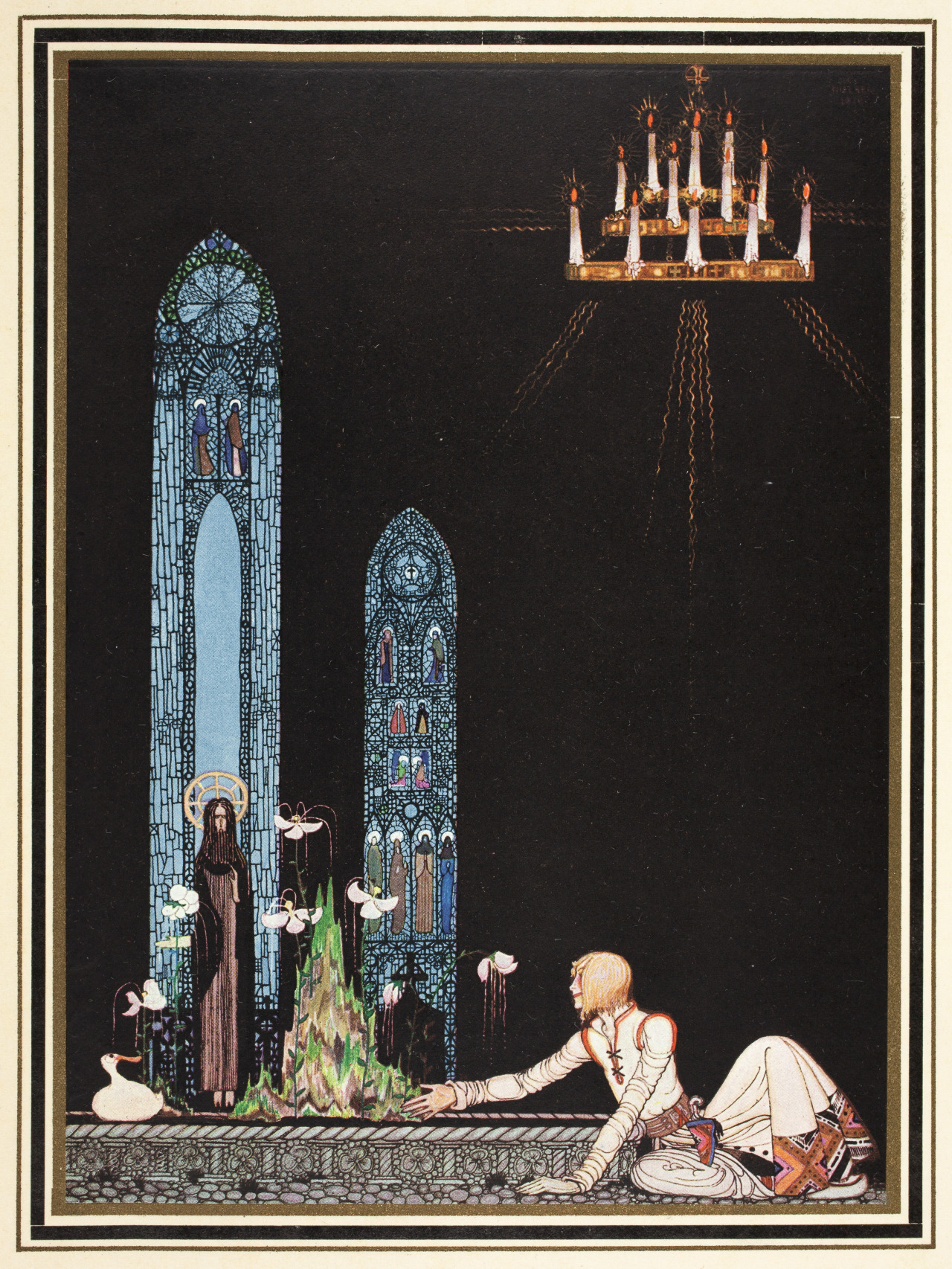

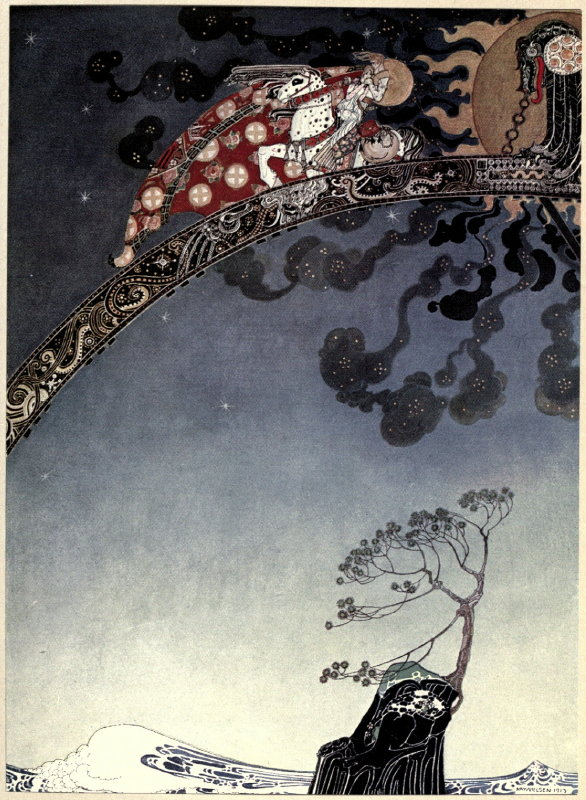

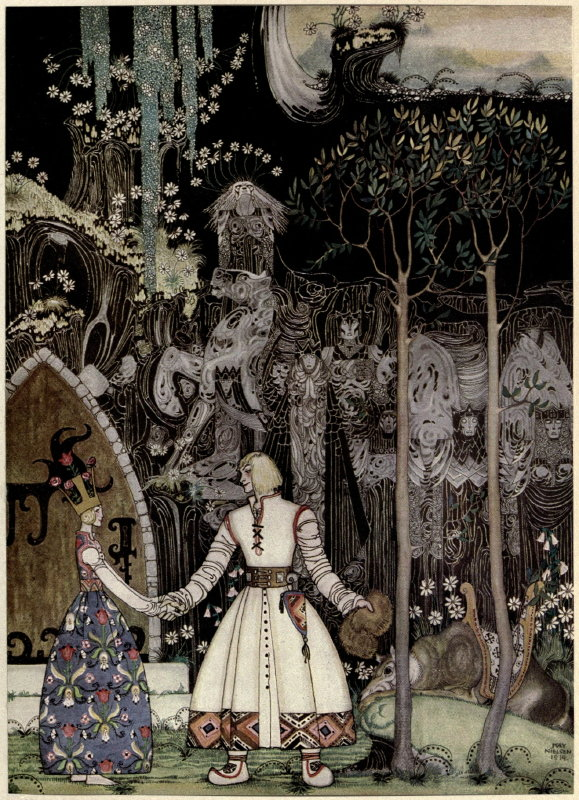

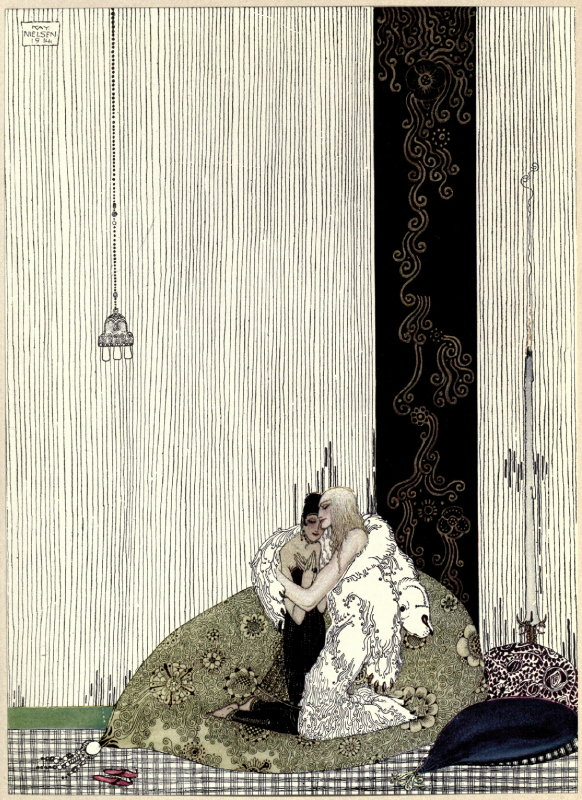

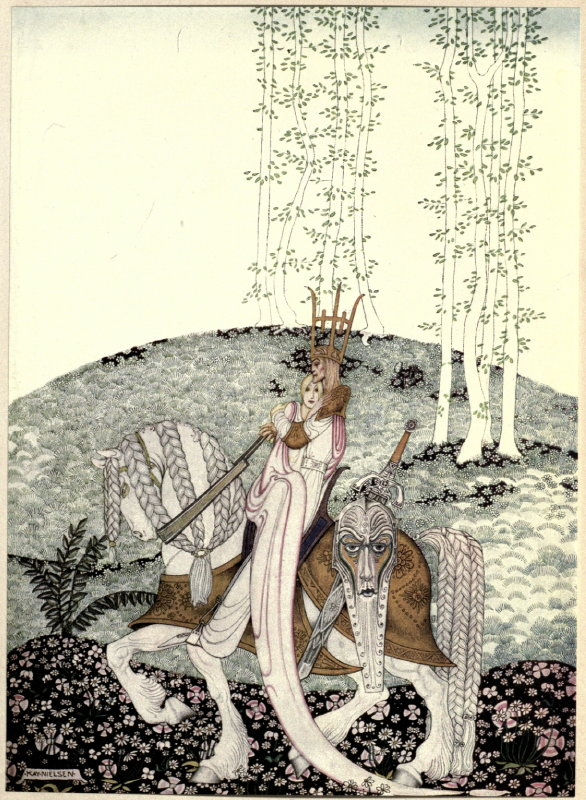

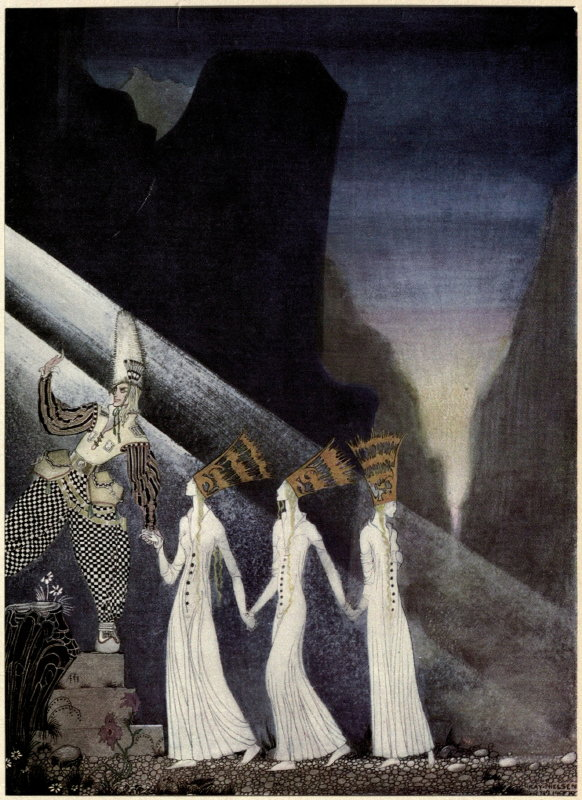

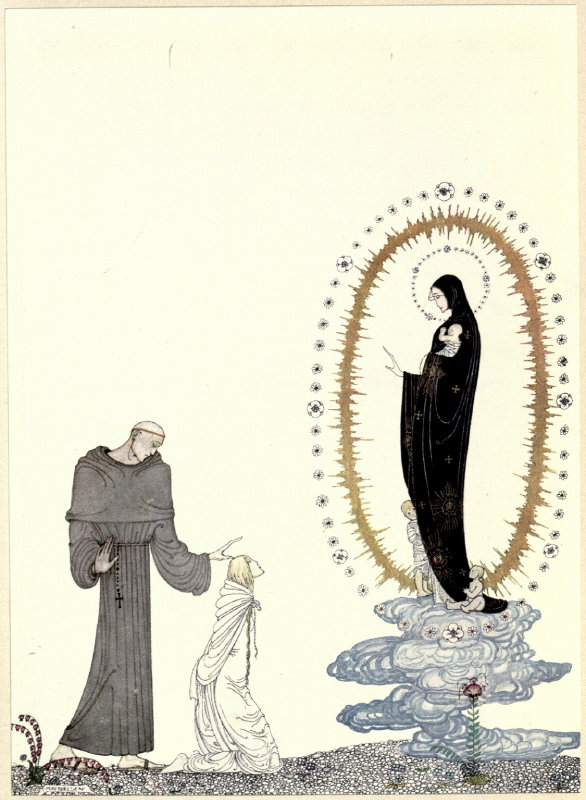

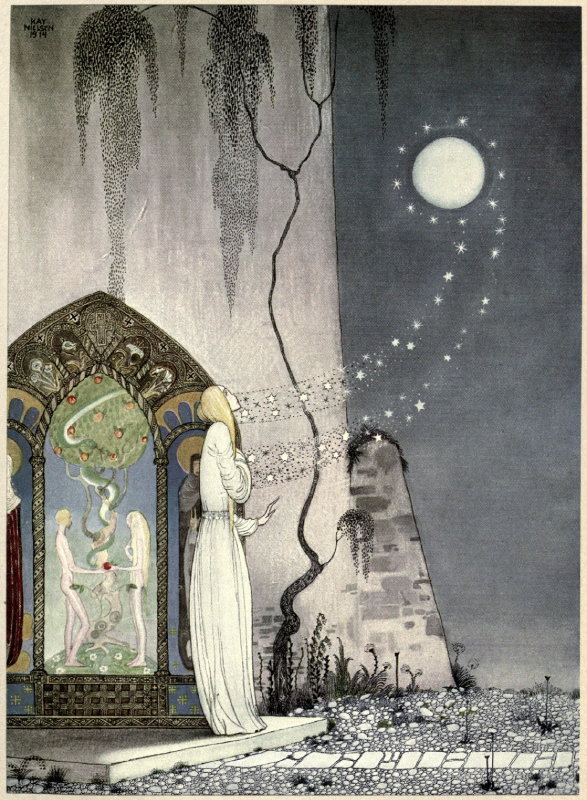

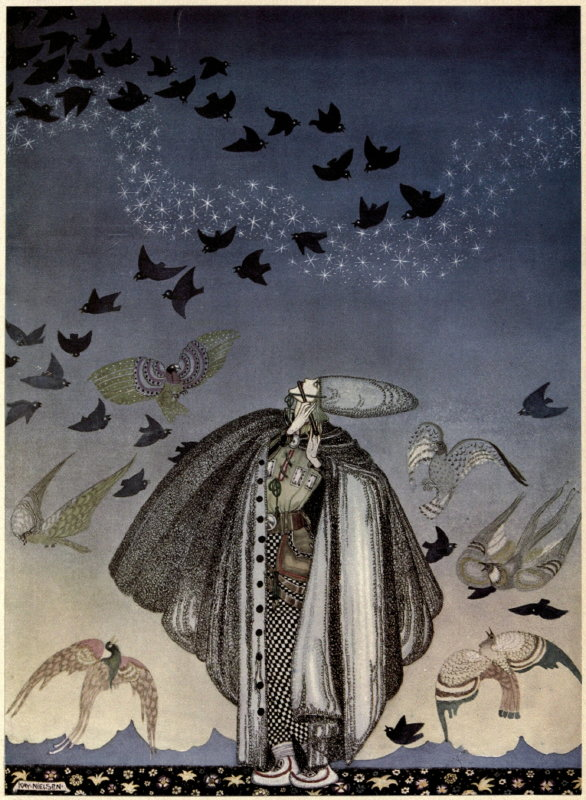

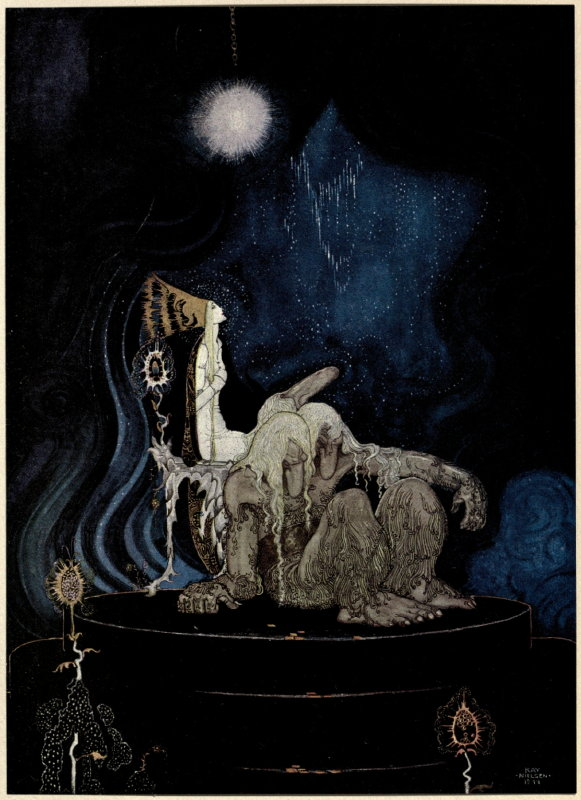

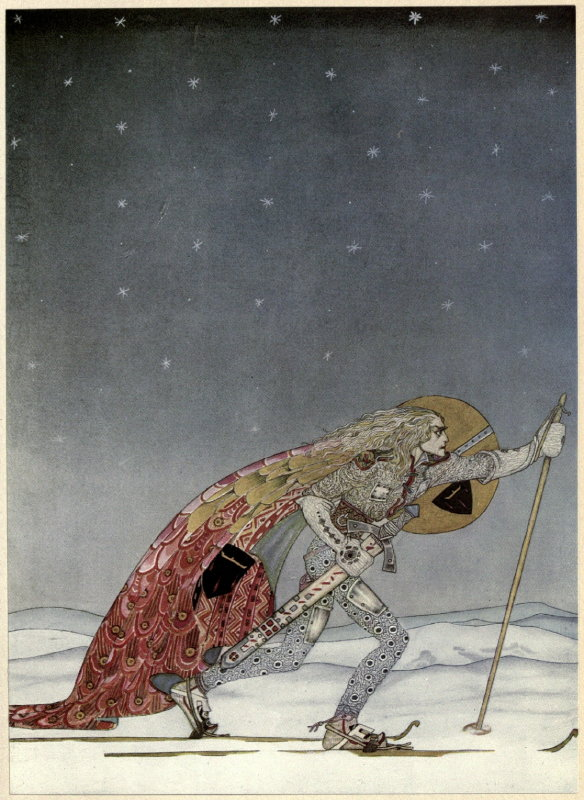

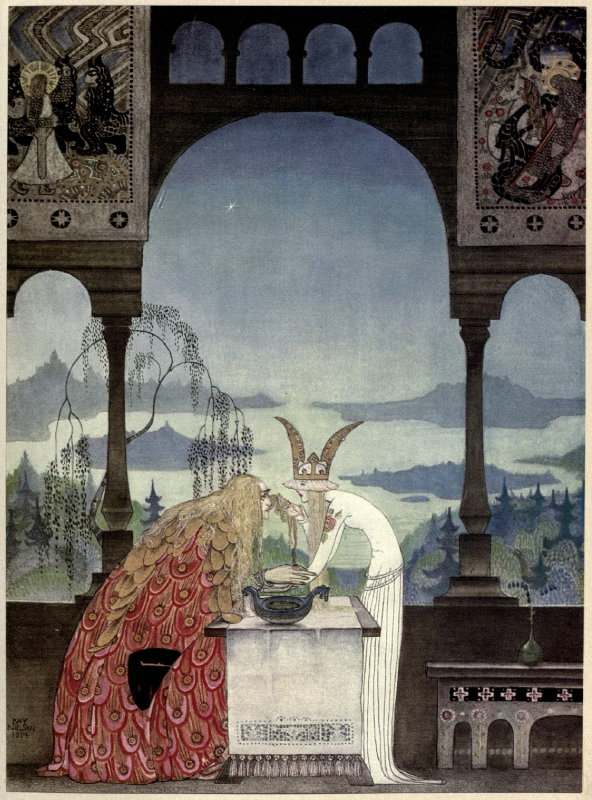

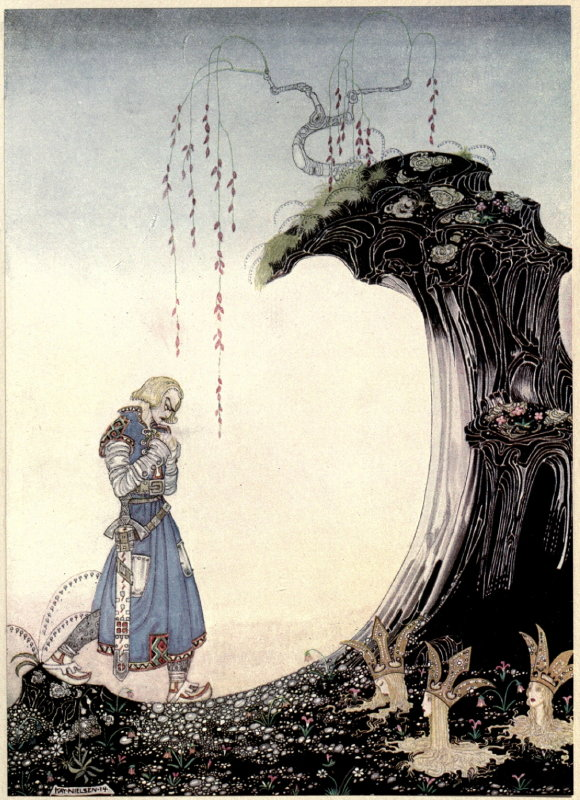

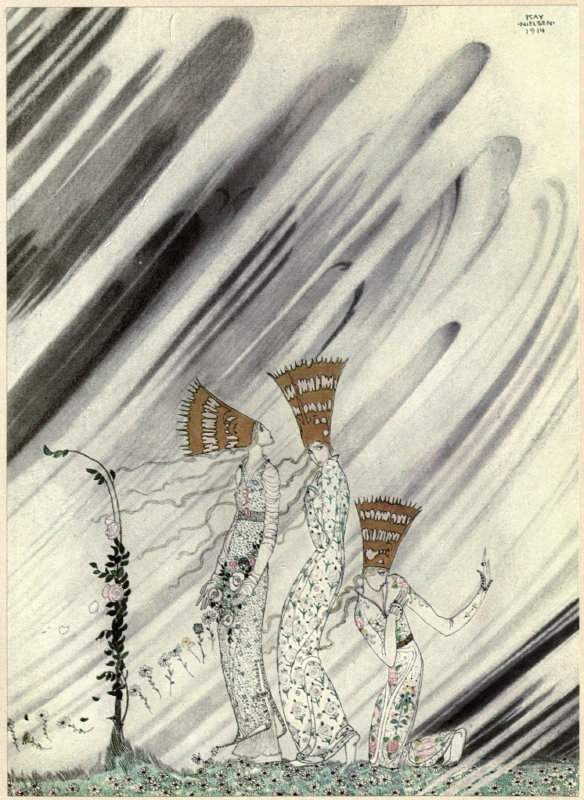

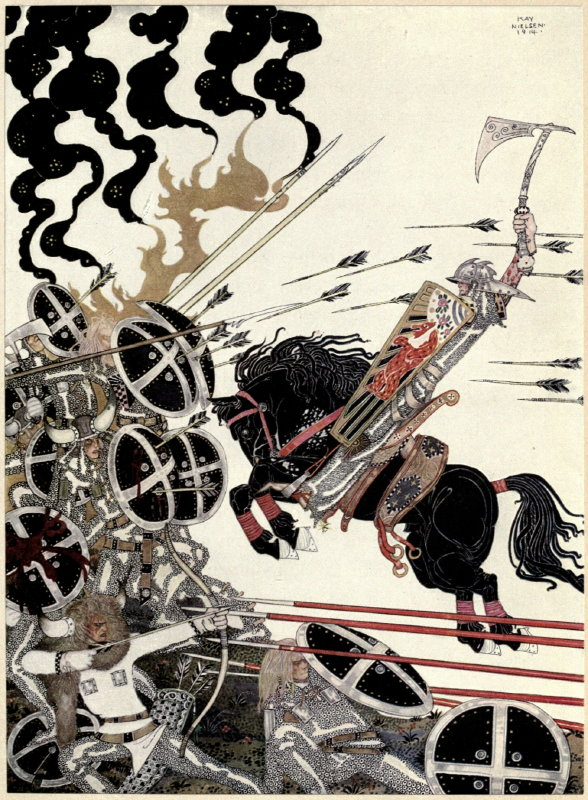

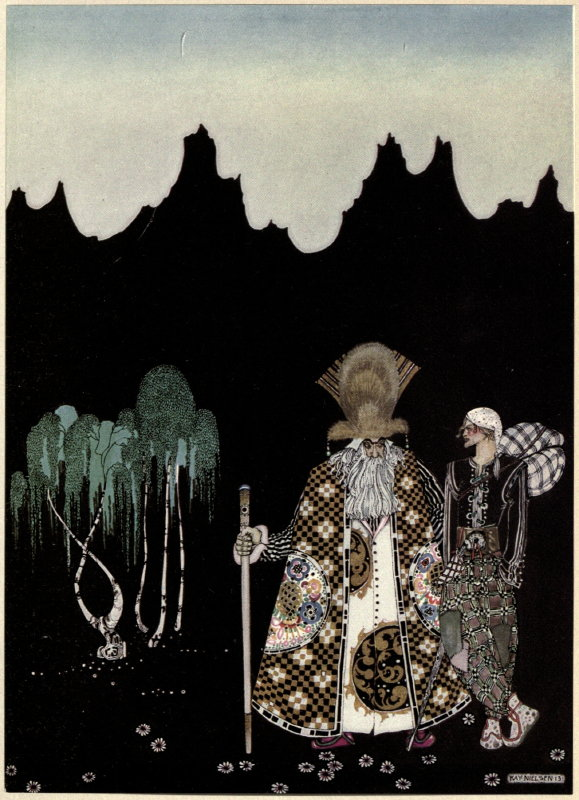

== See also ==
- Cupid and Psyche – Classical story of Cupid and Psyche
- Eglė the Queen of Serpents – Lithuanian folktale
- Pintosmalto – 1634 Italian literary fairy tale by Giambattista Basile
- The Feather of Finist the Falcon – Russian fairy tale
- J. R. R. Tolkien's use of this phrase – Walking songs from The Lord of the Rings
- Sigurd, the King's Son (Icelandic fairy tale) – Icelandic fairy tale about an animal bridegroom
- The Singing, Springing Lark – German fairy tale
- The Story of the Abandoned Princess - Norwegian fairy tale
- The Three Daughters of King O'Hara – Irish fairy tale
- The Three Princesses of Whiteland – Norwegian fairy tale
- The Two Kings' Children – German fairy tale
- Tulisa, the Wood-Cutter's Daughter (Indian folktale)
