= The Singing, Springing Lark =

German fairy tale

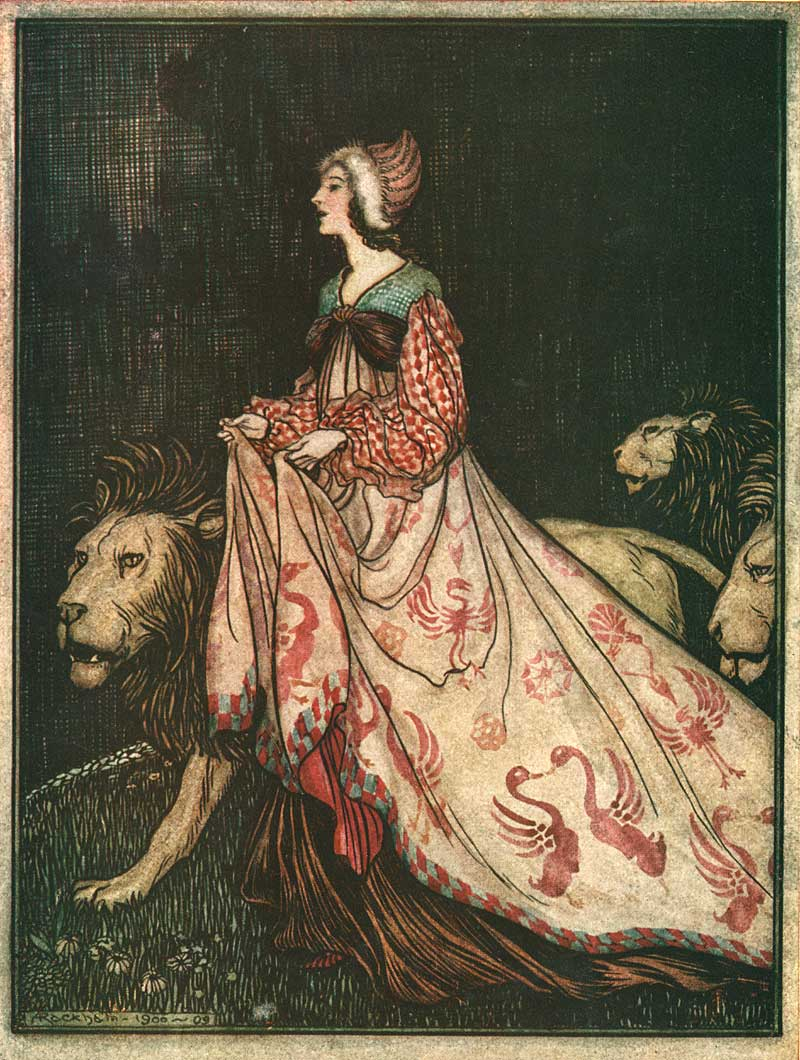
- 1909 illustration by Arthur Rackham

Folk tale
- Name: The Singing, Springing Lark
- Also known as: The Singing, Soaring Lark; The Lady and the Lion; Lily and the Lion
- Aarne–Thompson grouping: ATU 425C + ATU 425A
- Country: Germany
- Published in: Grimms' Fairy Tales

"The Singing, Springing Lark", "The Singing, Soaring Lark", "The Lady and the Lion" or "Lily and the Lion" (German: Das singende springende Löweneckerchen) is a German fairy tale collected by the Brothers Grimm, appearing as tale no. 88.

It is Aarne–Thompson type 425C. Others of this type include Beauty and the Beast and The Small-tooth Dog.

It also contains motifs from AT 425A, such as East of the Sun and West of the Moon, the search for the lost husband. Others of this type include Black Bull of Norroway, The Daughter of the Skies, The Brown Bear of Norway, The Enchanted Pig, The Tale of the Hoodie, The Iron Stove, The Sprig of Rosemary, and White-Bear-King-Valemon.

== Synopsis ==
There is a man with three daughters. One day, he must leave on a journey and asks each of his daughters what they would like him to bring back. The oldest wants diamonds, the second pearls, and the youngest a singing, springing lark (or a rose in some versions). The man is able to find diamonds and pearls, but he fails to find a lark. On his journey home, the man sees a lark in a tall tree, and orders his servant to catch it. Suddenly, a lion springs out and threatens to kill them both for trying to steal the lark. In exchange for their lives and the lark, the lion demands that the man bring him the first thing to meet him on his return home. The man fears it will be his youngest daughter who greets him, but his servant persuades him to accept the bargain.

Just as the man has feared, his youngest daughter is the first to greet him. When told of his promise, the daughter consoles her father and sets out the next morning to meet the lion. At the lion's castle, she is greeted by lions that, at night, turn human and she marries the lion whose lark her father had tried to take and lives with him, sleeping by day.

One night, the lion tells her that her oldest sister is marrying and offers to send her with his lions. She goes, and her family is glad to see her. After her return, the lion tells her that her second sister is marrying, and she says that he must go with her and their child. The lion tells her that if any candlelight falls on him, he will be transformed into a dove for seven years. The youngest daughter has a chamber built to protect him, but the door is made of green wood, and it warps, making a crack. When her sister's wedding procession goes by, candlelight falls on him, and he turns into a dove.

The dove tells his wife that for every seven steps she takes, he will drop a feather and a drop of blood, and perhaps she can track him by that, and flies off.

When the seven years are nearly up, the youngest daughter loses the trail. She climbs up to the sun and asks after the white dove; the sun does not know, but gives her a casket. She then asks the moon, who does not know, but gives her an egg. She asks the night wind, and it can not help her, but tells her to wait for the others; the east and west wind can not, but the south wind says that the dove was again a lion and fighting a dragon that is an enchanted princess near the Red Sea. The night wind advises her to strike the lion and dragon with a certain reed, to allow the lion to win and both creatures to regain their form, and then to escape on the back of a griffin. It gives her a nut that will grow to a nut tree in the middle of the sea, which would allow the griffin to rest.

The youngest daughter stops the fight, but the princess also regains her form and takes the man who had been a lion with her on the griffin. The daughter follows until she finds a castle where the princess and her husband are to be married.

She opens the casket and finds a dazzling dress in it. She brings it to the castle, and the princess buys it from her, the price being that the daughter is to spend the night in her husband's bedchamber. But it is to no avail because the princess has a page give him a sleeping draught. Though the daughter pleads with him, he thinks it is the wind's whistling.

The next day, she opens the egg. It holds a chicken with twelve golden chicks. The princess again buys them for the same price, but this time, her husband asks the page what was the wind the previous night, and the page confesses to the draught. He does not drink it the second night, and he and his wife flee on the griffin to their home.

== Analysis ==
=== Tale type ===
American folklorist D. L. Ashliman, in his 1987 study on folktales, classified the tale as type 425C, "Beauty and the Beast". In the international Aarne-Thompson-Uther Index as type ATU 425A, "The Animal as Bridegroom". In this tale type, the heroine is a human maiden who marries a prince that is cursed to become an animal of some sort. She betrays his trust and he disappears, prompting a quest for him.

=== Motifs ===
The heroine of this fairy tale depicts unusual courage in facing the animal bridegroom; it is she who insists that her father's promise must be kept, rather than the common pattern of the father pleading with the daughter to fulfill his word, as in East of the Sun and West of the Moon. Beauty from Beauty and the Beast is like this.

According to Hans-Jörg Uther, the opening motif of the heroine's request of a gift from her father "frequently" introduces other Animal as Bridegroom tales.

==== The heroine's journey ====
According to Hans-Jörg Uther, the main feature of tale type ATU 425A is "bribing the false bride for three nights with the husband". In fact, when he developed his revision of Aarne-Thompson's system, Uther remarked that an "essential" trait of the tale type ATU 425A was the "wife's quest and gifts" and "nights bought". In stories from Europe, mostly, the heroine's helpers may be three old crones, or her husband's relatives.

== Adaptations ==
=== Animation ===
An episode of Simsala Grimm adapts this tale.

=== Literature ===
Patricia McKillip retold this story as "The Lion and the Lark".

This story was also retold as a picture book called "The Lady and the Lion".

This story is also retold as a picture story by Elle Skinner on webcomic Erstwhile.

The tale was adapted into hidden object game Queen's Tales: The Beast and the Nightingale, by publisher Big Fish Games.

=== Music ===
A musical version of The Singing, Springing Lark, written by Dieter Stegmann and Alexander S. Bermange was presented at the Amphitheater Park Schloss Philippsruhe, Hanau, Germany as part of the Brothers Grimm Festival in 2004.

== See also ==
- The Three Princesses of Whiteland
- Nix Nought Nothing
- The Feather of Finist the Falcon
