= Mr Simigdáli =

Greek fairy tale

Mr Simigdáli ("The Gentleman Made of Groats", in Max Lüthi's translation) is a Greek fairy tale, collected by Irene Naumann-Mavrogordato in Es war einmal: Neugriechische Volksmärchen. Georgios A. Megas collected a variant Master Semolina in Folktales of Greece. There are about forty known Greek variants on the fairy tale of baking a figure and having it brought to life. It is Aarne-Thompson type 425, the search for the lost bridegroom, in an unusual variation, involving motifs similar to Pygmalion and Galatea.

== Synopsis ==
A king's daughter refuses all her suitors. She takes almonds, sugar, and groats—or semolina—and makes the figure of a man from them. Then she prays for forty days, and God brings the figure to life. He is called Mr Simigdáli (Mr Groats)—or Master Semolina if made from that—and is very handsome. An evil queen hears of him and sends a golden ship to kidnap him. Everyone comes out to see it, and the sailors as instructed- capture Mr Simigdáli. The princess learns how he had been carried off, has three pairs of iron shoes made for herself, and sets out.

With the first pair of iron shoes worn out, she comes to the mother of the Moon, who has her wait until the Moon comes, but the Moon can not tell her where Mr Simigdáli has been taken, and sends her on to the Sun, having given her an almond for her to break upon need. The Sun and its mother give her a walnut and send her on to the Stars. No star has seen him, except for a little star which then takes her to the castle where Mr Simigdáli is prisoner after being given to drink the water of oblivion, and the star gives her a hazelnut. She looks like a beggar and he does not recognize her, so she begs for a job taking care of the geese.

Then she breaks the almond and it holds a golden spindle, reel and wheel. The servants tell the queen, who asks what she wants for her; the princess will trade it only for Mr Simigdáli to spend a night with her. The queen agrees but gives Mr Simigdáli a sleeping potion. The princess tries to talk to him but she cannot wake him. Then she breaks the walnut, which contains a golden hen and her chicks, and she tries and fails again. The hazelnut contains golden carnations, but that day, a tailor, who lives next to the girl who tends to the geese, asks Mr Simigdáli how he can sleep at night what with all the girl's talk. Mr Simigdáli realises something is off so he secretly readies his horse and only pretends to drink the potion; so, when the princess begins to talk to him, he rises and takes her with him on his horse.

In the morning, the queen sends for him, but he is not there. She tries to make her own man, but when the figure is done, she curses instead of praying, and the figure rots. The princess and Mr Simigdáli return home and live happily ever after.

== Analysis ==
=== Tale type ===
Although the tale is classified as the more general type ATU 425, "The Search for the Lost Husband", the tale pertains to a cycle of stories found in Italy, Greece and Turkey: the heroine, refusing to marry any suitor chosen for her, decides to fashion her own husband out of materials, and prays to a deity for him to come alive.

It could be considered, therefore, a subtype specific to Italy. The type is also considered a Greek-Turkish oikotype of The Disenchanted Husband, which, according to Jan-Öjvind Swahn's study, falls under type 425B: the artificial husband created by the heroine and the exchange of three nuts for three nights with her husband. (Note: For clarification, in his work Swahn calls type B the one which involves the "three nights". He also grouped stories about "the artificial husband" under type B.) In the same vein, Marilena Papachristophorou identified three motifs that "essentially" form this subtype: 1) the fabrication of an ideal mate; 2) the heroine's quest that leads her to three supernatural helpers; 3) the three wonderful objects exchanged for three nights with the found husband.

=== Motifs ===
Lüthi remarked that the reference to number forty indicated the presence of the tale in the Orient, since the numeral has cultural significance for Middle Eastern cultures (e.g., indicating a period of maturation or purification).

==== The gifts from the helpers ====
The heroine, creator and lover of the artificial husband, gains exquisite presents from her supernatural helpers, which she will use to bribe the kidnapping queen for a night with her lover. Also, according to Max Lüthi, the heroine cracks open the nuts and almonds she gets from her helpers and finds beautiful dresses that depict the skies (or heavens), the earth and the seas.

==== The hero's ingredients ====
Folklorists Georgios A. Megas and Michael Merakles, as well as researcher Marilena Papachristophorou, noted that in these tales, the hero is named after the materials with which he was created: herbs, musk, amber, cinnamon and sugar.

According to Papachristophorou, the more common names for the hero include Sucrepétri, Moscambaris or Muscambre, after the materials used to build the husband (in the latter two, musk and amber), although the tale is better known as Simigdalenios ("Man of Semolina").

In addition, German scholar Max Lüthi noted that sugar appears to be "the crucial ingredient" in most variants from Greece and Italy, although Papachristophorou remarks that it is the "most common [ingredient] in all versions" of the story. Papachristophorou interpreted that the incidence of the sugar in the heroine's creation of the perfect man in the story is multifarious: historically, sugar was a commodity more rare and precious than honey, known since Antiquity; thus, being a rare spice, it adds an exotic component in the fabrication process, and, being a granulous substance, meshes well with other granulous and pulveral ingredients.

== Variants ==
=== Greece ===
According to Marilena Papachristophorou and Georgios Megas, 42 variants exist "in all regions of Greece".

German linguist Paul Kretschmer translated a Greek tale into German as Der Mann aus Zucker ("The Man [made] of Sugar").

Greek professor Michael Merakles translated a Greek tale into German with the title Die Moschusknabe ("The Boy of Musk"). In this tale, the heroine is a princess who locks herself up in a church for 40 days, with refined flour and spices, and fashions a seven-year-old son for her. A second king's daughter becomes jealous of the boy and wants her for herself, so asks her father to kidnap him. The first princess goes after the child with iron shoes, and passes by the Moon, the Sun and the Wind, who each gives her a nut, an almond nut and a pistachio nut. The nuts produce golden objects (golden chicks, a golden spindle and a golden yarn) which she tries to use to bribe her way to the boy. At the end of the tale, the princess rescues her son and flies back home on a magic carpet. Merakles noted that the tale was unusual in that the heroine creates a child, instead of a lover, which happens in other variants.

In a Greek tale titled The Stolen Prince, princess Ariadne, who likes to cook, asks her kitchen maids to bring her some almonds, sugar, semolina, figs and pears, wine, and lemons, and moulds some figurines for the children, while mentioning that she could fashion a husband for herself. That same night, she creeps into the kitchen and fashions a male statue she calls Prince Marchpane. The following morning, she takes the man of paste to the statue of Saint Cecelia and begins to pray to God for the male effigy to come alive. After a while, Prince Marchpane turns into a real man, to the princess's delight, and, still nude, carries her to their chambers. Ariadne's father marries his daughter to the prince, and news of his exquisite beauty reaches the ears of a foreign queen in a distant darker kingdom. The foreign queen sails to Ariadne's kingdom on a jewelled ship with golden oars, which will serve as a distraction, and the Queen orders her crew to capture the handsome Prince Marchpane and bring him to her. Her sailors surround him, take him to the golden ship and depart. Princess Ariadne notices her lover's delay and discovers the golden ship has sailed, and no sight of Prince Marchpane. She then dons three pairs of iron shoes, and walks through many lands. She feeds on many roots and berries and even strange mushroom. After eating some of the mushroom, she is transported to the house of the Moon and her mother, where she gains an almond, the house of the Sun and his mother, where she gains a walnut, and the Stars and their mother, where she gains a hazelnut. The smallest Star tells Ariadne Prince Marchpane is being kept prisoner of the White-Browed Queen. Ariadne then walks towards the end of the Milky Way, then wakes up near a strange land: she is near the Queen's palace, and she is looking like a poor beggarwoman. She finds work as a replacement gooseherder, and cracks open each of the nuts: for the first time, she produces a silver spinning wheel that spins silver thread; for the second time, she releases a golden duck with a dozen golden ducklings, all made of gold; the third time, she finds a tree yielding gemstones. Princess Ariadne uses the gifts from the elements to bribe the Queen for a night in Marchpane's quarters: she tries to wake him up, but the Queen has given him a soporific drink. Before the third night, a tailor who lives next to the goosegirl's hut and sews clothes for Marchpane whispers the prince about his true wife, the princess, who has come to rescue him. On the third night, Ariadne trades the gemstone tree for a last night with Marchpane. The prince pretends to drink the wine, and feigns sleep. Ariadne goes to his room and cries over his body; Marchpane wakes up and escapes with the princes on horse Arion back to her kingdom. Defeated, the Queen tries to make her own man of raw materials, but the statue melts under her country's humid air.

=== Asia ===
==== Turkey ====
In the Typen türkischer Volksmärchen ("Turkish Folktale Catalogue"), devised by Wolfram Eberhard and Pertev Naili Boratav, both scholars indexed a similar narrative under type TTV 105, "Der Mann aus Wachs" ("The Man [Made] of Wax"), with three variants registered until 1953. In this type, the third and youngest princess is still single, and fashions a male figure made of wax; with her prayers, the figure comes to life; later, the man, now human, is taken by another princess to her kingdom, and his creator/lover goes after him; in her quest, she is given precious objects she will use to bribe the princess for three nights with the man.

In a Turkish tale collected by Turkologist Ignác Kúnos and titled Miszk-amber királyfi ("The Musk-Amber Prince"), an Indian ruler has a daughter who decides to marry no one. She then asks her father to provide forty camels loaded with musk and forty camels loaded with gray amber. After getting the objects, she locks her up in her room and fashions a man with the material and a horse with the leftovers, then spends the next 40 days and nights in deep prayer so both creations gain life. It happens thus, and the princess sends the horse to the stables and the boy to be secluded in a room, under the care and watch of governesses. One day, when the male creation is twelve years old, he uses a leftover chicken bone to crack the glass from his room and see the outside world for the first time. He also sees the horse creation the princess made, and is told the horse, named "Kamer" ('Moon') belongs to him. The boy jumps on Kamer and both ride away from the kingdom. The princess is alerted about the boy's flight, and goes after Miskember (named so after the materials used in his creation). She walks in iron garments and a skirt made of hairs, and with an iron cane. Back to Miskember, he and the horse reach the palace of the Yemeni padishah, and the monarch decides to marry him to his daughter. The princess reaches the Yemeni lands and asks for shelter at the palace kitchen. The Yemeni princess agrees to take her in, if she can make Miskember smile. One day, as soon as Miskember comes back from the hunt, he sights his creatress and smiles at her. The Yemeni princess then places the wanderer in a room just beneath her chambers, where she spends every day and night singing verses of longing and sorrow to make Miskember remember. After a while, the Yemeni princess decides to call off her marriage to Miskember and returns him to his creatress. The pair rides back to the Indian kingdom and find a platoon of her father's soldiers en route. Everyone returns home, and Miskember and the princess celebrate their marriage. The tale was translated to Russian by Nina A. Tsvetinovich-Gryunberg with the title "Девушка и Мискембер" ("The Girl and Miskember").

==== Iraq ====
Russian professor V. A. Yaremenko translated into Russian an Iraqi tale titled "Султан Анбар" ("Sultan Ambar"): a princess is courted by many men, but she chooses no suitor. Fed up with all the rejected princes and emirs, the king announces he will wed her to the first suitor. The princess, then, decides to build herself a husband, with musk, amber (or ambergris), rose water and Indian perfumes. She prays to Allah to give him a soul and animate him, and her prayers are answered. She takes the artificial man to her father and introduces him as Sultan Ambar, her fiancé. A witch princess from another country hears about Sultan Ambar's beauty and kidnaps him after their wedding. The princess journeys far and wide to find him, and has some adventures on the way there, by helping kings and villages. She is rewarded with a chicken with chicks that eat pearls instead of grains, a dress encrusted with pearls and a saad bird made of diamond and eyes of agate. The princess uses the three items as bribes to buy three nights in her husband's bed in the witch princess's castle.

==== Iraqi Turkmens ====
In a tale from the Iraqi Turkmens with the title Miski Amber Matalı, translated to Turkish as Miski Amber Masalı ("Tale of Musk and Amber"), a king has a daughter. One day, the princess uses some dough, adds fragrances and musk and amber, and shapes it to a handsome boy, then prays to Allah to give him a soul. After her creation gains a soul, she sends him to the imam and to religious lessons. People learn of the child of dough and try to replicate the process, with no success. A foreign princess, daughter of an infidel king, tries her hand at it and cannot succeed, so she wants to have the princess's creation. A wicked woman offers to bring the dough-created boy, dons a religious disguise, buries her vehicle in the ground, and approaches the boy, pretending to be a woman that fell from her camel during pilgrimage. Out of pity, the boy takes the woman home, who earns his trust after days, and asks him to accompany to the river. She takes him to the vehicle, unearths it, ties the boy to the vehicle and flies off to the infidel princess's kingdom. The boy's creator realizes he has vanishes and goes after him in strange lands with her tutor's help. During her adventures, she helps a maddened princess in another kingdom and gains a gold zubun as reward, cures an ailing prince by removing a dragon-snake from his belly and gains golden clogs as reward, and lastly rescues a kidnapped boy from his captor's hands and gains a golden sheet. Finally, the princess and her lala (tutor) arrive at the infidel princess's kingdom, and the princess takes out the golden objects to trade with the wicked princess for three nights in the dough-boy's, called Miski Amber, chambers.

==== Palestine ====
In a Palestinian folktale (or Jrefiyye) titled ḥikāya Lü'lü ("The Tale of Lü'lü"), translated to Spanish as Lü'lü, a king goes on a pilgrimage. While he is away, his only daughter, princess Sa'ada, ransacks his storage, snatches some pearls and fashions a male statue with them. The princess begins to pray for God to grant life to the statue, and she is joined by 50 maidservants. After some time, their collective prayers are heard, and the statue comes to life, whom the princess takes as her lover. The king learns the princess found a fiancé while he was away, then goes back home to obtain some explanations. The princess points her father to the empty closet, and explains she fashioned a lover out of the pearls. Upon learning the truth, the king approves of his daughter's marriage.
