= Hugo Oelbermann =

German poet and bookseller (1832–1898)

Hugo Alexander Oelbermann
- Born: 4 October 1832; Müllenbach, Marienheide, Germany
- Died: 1898 (aged 65–66); Bad Godesberg, Bonn, Germany
- Other names: Hugo von Müllenbach, Ernst Thränenlacher, Nath. Faust
- Occupations: Poet, bookseller

Hugo Alexander Oelbermann (or Ölbermann; 4 October 1832 – 1898) was a German poet and bookseller. His pseudonyms were Hugo von Müllenbach, Ernst Thränenlacher, and Nath. Faust.

== Life ==
Oelbermann was born on 4 October 1832 in Müllenbach, Marienheide, Germany, the son of pastor Friedrich Oelbermann and Marianne von Wenckstern (née Komp). The writer and journalist Otto von Wenckstern was his stepbrother.

Hugo received his education at a boys' boarding school and at a rector's school in Gummersbach. In 1848, he went to Barmen to apprentice under Wilhelm Langewiesche (b. 1807) as a bookseller. In Barmen, he met the poets Emil Rittershaus and Carl Siebel, with whom he founded the Wuppertal poets' circle.

Later, after 1853, he worked as a bookseller in Königsberg, Gotha, Zurich, and Leipzig. In Leipzig, he also wrote for Die Gartenlaube magazine. On 19 October 1859, he asked Siebel to inquire with Friedrich Engels or Karl Marx whether they could financially support him.

In 1866, he helped to provision a statue for the tomb of Friederike Brion, made by the sculptor Wilhelm Hornberger. Oelbermann is said to have joined the "Young Germanic School" at one point, as stated in a publication about Marie von Ebner-Eschenbach. In 1882, he founded the short-lived Bonner Montagsblatt (Bonn Monday Journal), which became a publishing house a few months later under the name Das Alte Blatt (The Old Leaf).

Oelbermann died in 1898 in Bad Godesberg, Bonn, and was buried on November 2, 1898, in the Castle Cemetery.

== Legacy ==
His poem "Maienglöcklein" was set to music by Paul Hindermann. His poem "O säh ich auf der Heide dort" was set to music by Franz Neuhofer in his unpublished Opus 25.

In the Kalliope Catalog, letters from him to Julius Campe, the J. G. Cotta’sche Buchhandlung (publishing house), Lorenz Diefenbach, Luise Förster (1794–1877), Karl Gutzkow, Hermann Kletke, Adolf Stern, and others are preserved.
