= Wuppertal poets' circle =

German literary circle in the 1850s

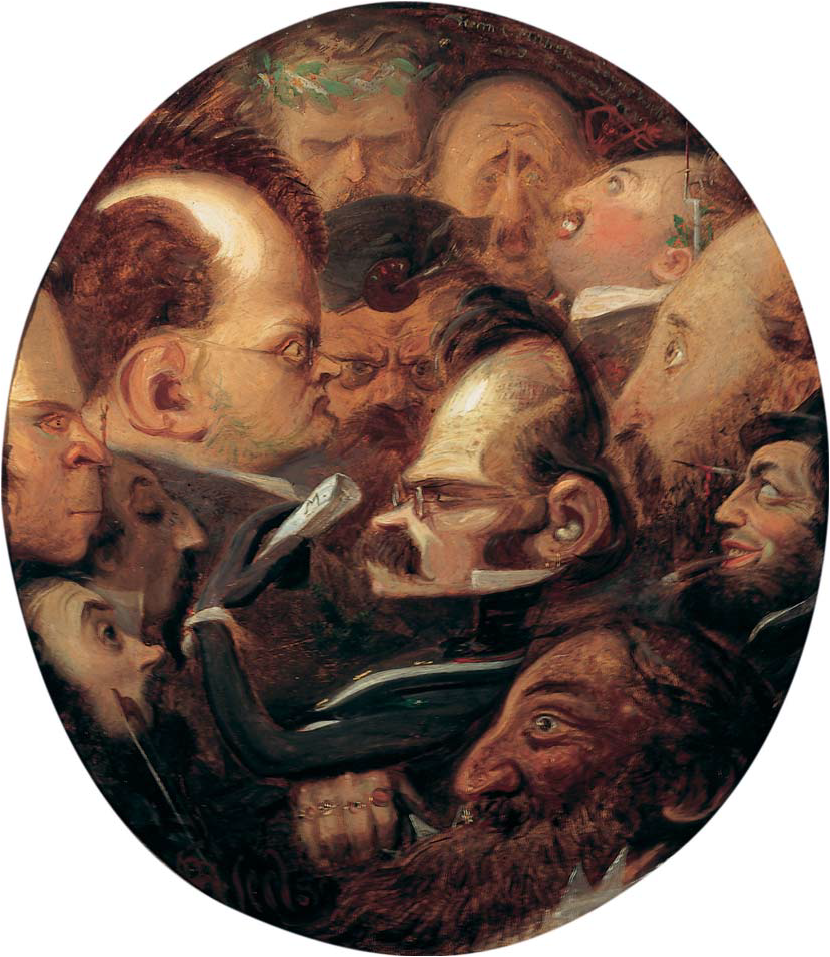
An 1859 caricature by Johann Richard Seel that depicts Siebel (top-left), Rittershaus and Carl Michels.

The Wuppertal poets' circle (German: Wuppertaler Dichterkreis or Wupperbund) was a literary circle that existed during the 1850s, remaining active into the 1870s and 1880s. The core of the loosely-knit group consisted of seven poets born in or around Wuppertal, Germany: the merchants Reinhart Neuhaus, Emil Rittershaus, Friedrich Roeber, Adolf Schults, Wilhelm Wens, Carl Siebel, Karl Stelter, and the bookseller Hugo Oelbermann. The circle "opposed gloomy Wuppertal Pietism with a free and joyful view of existence."

== History ==
The founders of the Wuppertal poets' circle largely came from affluent merchant families. The forerunners to the circle included Biedermeier reading clubs, theatres and other societies in the 1830s and 1840s—directly, however, the association had its origins in an earlier reading circle and amateur theatre existing in the late 1840s, composed of Hugo Oelbermann, Emil Ritterhaus, Wilhelm Wens and later Carl Siebel.

This culminated in the founding of the circle in 1850, initially called the Wupperbund (lit. 'Wuppertal federation'), by Oelbermann, Rittershaus, Wens and Siebel. Aiming to give the circle credibility, they recruited figures already known in Wuppertal such as Adolf Schults and Friedrich Roeber, as well as lawyers, conductors and organists.

The members of the circle met at the coffeehouse of "Knevels" in the Old Market (Altenmarkt) in Barmen, Wuppertal.

The circle partially dissolved in 1853, after the departure of Oelbermann from Barmen, and was replaced by a Sunday circle (Sonntagskränzchen) at the house of Roeber, consisting of poetry recitations and drama readings. This successor dissolved in the early 1860s.

Jost Hermand in 1998 summarised the circle:

In their works is manifested the ideological dilemma of young merchants and factory owners' sons, who, despite their relentless desire for competition and their ruthless exploitation of the workers who laboured for them, continued to try to surround themselves with the early bourgeois-liberal appearance of education, even of poetic genius.

The term Wuppertaler Dichterkreis used to describe the group was coined by poet Wolfgang Müller von Königswinter in 1863.

Friedrich Engels knew multiple members of the circle, keeping in contact with them during his residence in Bremen in 1838–1841, as some were fellow pupils of his at the Elberfeld high school. This is also evidenced by his association and correspondence with Siebel and Rittershaus.

== Notable members ==
- Carl Siebel
- Karl Stelter
- Hugo Oelbermann
- Friedrich Roeber
- Emil Rittershaus
- Wilhelm Wens
- Adolf Schults
- Reinhart Neuhaus
- Jan Albert van Eijken
- Carl Reinecke
- Johann Richard Seel
- Heinrich Koester

== The 1970s Wupperbund ==
In the early 1970s, a literature workshop was established at the Wuppertal Adult Education Center, which was compared to the Wuppertal circle in the regional press. This new "literature workshop" participated in the founding of the nationwide Literature of the Working World Workgroup in Cologne in 1970 and then hosted a large gathering of its member "workshops" as part of the intercommunal festival URBS '71 in Vohwinkel, Wuppertal.
