= Adolf Schults =

German poet (1820–1858)

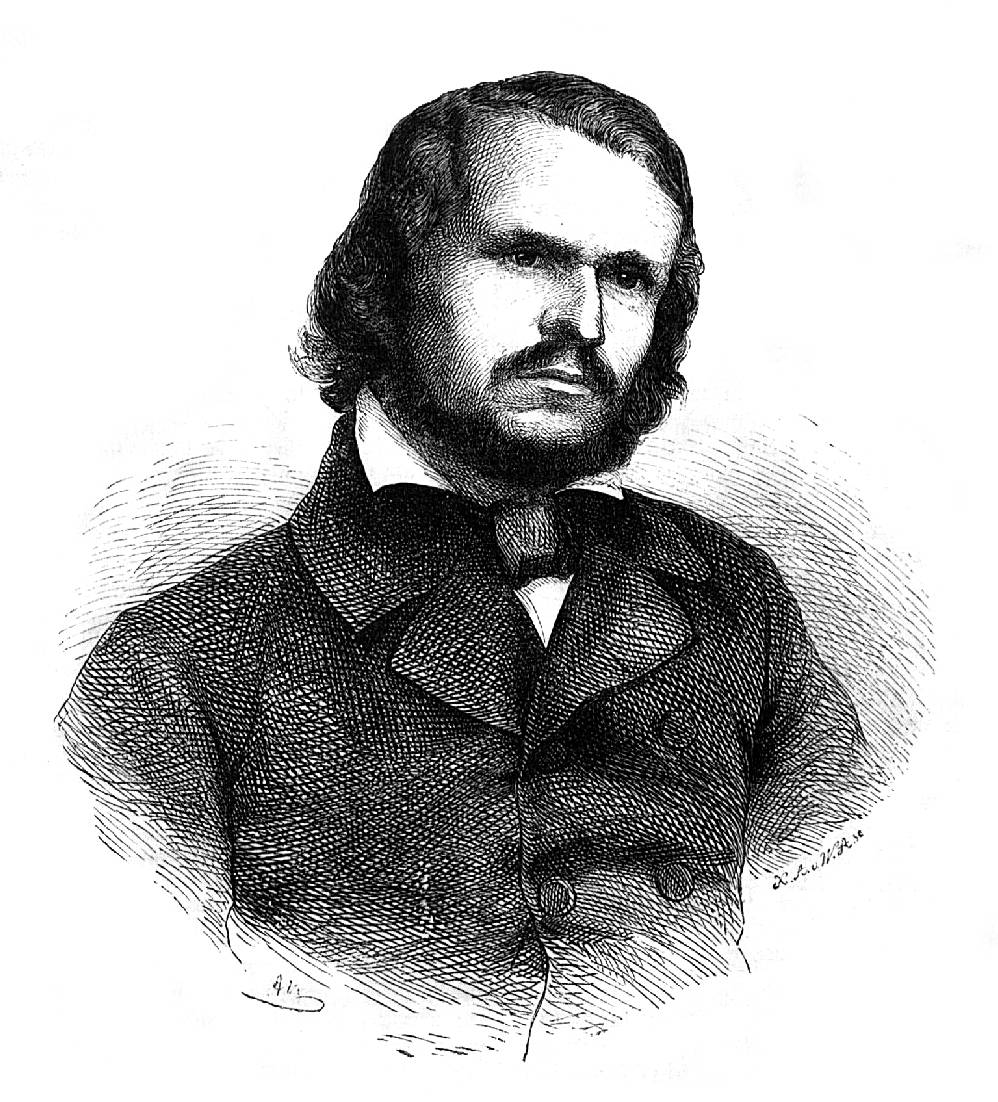
Schults' picture in a biographical article commemorating his death, published in 1858 in the magazine Die Gartenlaube

Adolf Schults (5 June 1820 – 2 April 1858) was a German poet.

== Life ==
Schults was born in Elberfeld, Germany on 5 June 1820 to parents of "little financial means". His father was a foreman in a silk goods factory, while his more-educated mother came from a French family. After leaving school before reaching the secondary level, he entered his father's business. After marrying in 1843, he left this business six months after his father was forced to resign.

He was a deputy editor of the Barmer Zeitung newspaper for a time, but left it sometime before 1848.

He mainly worked as an accountant while writing poetry in his free time, in a situation similar to his childhood friend Friedrich Roeber.

Schults became known primarily for his lyrical works. Among his most famous poems, some of which also contained sociopolitical themes, is the satirical parody Ein neues Lied von den Webern (A New Song of the Weavers), written in response to Heinrich Heine's 1844 poem The Silesian Weavers. Also frequently cited today is his Mother's Day poem Das Mutterauge (Mother's Eye).

He was a member of the Wuppertal poets' circle (Wuppertaler Dichterkreis) in the early 1850s. In Schults' estate, the historian Michael Knieriem found the fragment of a drama by Friedrich Engels, entitled Cola di Rienzi. Schults also wrote a poem about Engels in 1848/49.

He died on 2 April 1858 in Elberfeld—reportedly "excessive work, especially at night time, increased his nervousness and ultimately led to the uncanny chest pain [Brustleiden] to which he succumbed".

== Works ==
- — (1843). Gedichte. Erste Sammlung [Poems. First Collection] (in German). Magdeburg: Emil Baensch. OCLC 1344529729.
  - — (1847). Gedichte (in German) (2nd greatly expanded ed.). Magdeburg: Emil Baensch. OCLC 504258840.
  - — (1857). Gedichte (in German) (3rd expanded ed.). Iserlohn: Julius Baedeker. OCLC 504258840.
  - — (1857). Gedichte (in German) (4th ed.). Iserlohn: Julius Baedeker. OCLC 504258840.
- — (1847). Was ist des Michel Vaterland? Versuch zu einem neuen National- und Volkslied, den deutschen Männern Ernst Moritz Arndt und Ferdinand Delbrück in aufrichtiger Verehrung gewidmet [What is the Homeland of Michel? Attempt at a new national and folk song, dedicated to the German men Ernst Moritz Arndt and Ferdinand Delbrück in sincere reverence] (in German). Leipzig: Jurany.
- — (1848). Märzgesänge. 25 Zeitgedichte [March Songs. 25 Contemporary Poems] (in German). Elberfeld & Iserlohn: Julius Baedeker.
- — (1849). Leierkastenlieder [Organ Grinder Songs] (in German). Munich.
- — (1851). Haus und Welt. Neuere Gedichte [Home and World. Newer Poems] (in German). Elberfeld: Julius Baedeker. OCLC 246659931.
- — (1853). Martin Luther. Ein lyrisch-epischer Cyklus [Martin Luther. A Lyric-Epic Cycle] (in German). Leipzig: F. A. Brockhaus AG. OCLC 679943861.
- — (1855). Ludwig Capet. Ein historisches Gedicht [Louis Capet. A Historical Poem] (in German). Elberfeld: Julius Baedeker. OCLC 504258850.
- — (1858). Der Harfner am Heerd. Ein lyrischer Cyklus [The Harpist at the Hearth. A Lyrical Cycle] (in German). Weimar: Böhlau Verlag. OCLC 247391550.
