= Fritz Roeber =

German illustrator, lithographer and painter (1851–1924)

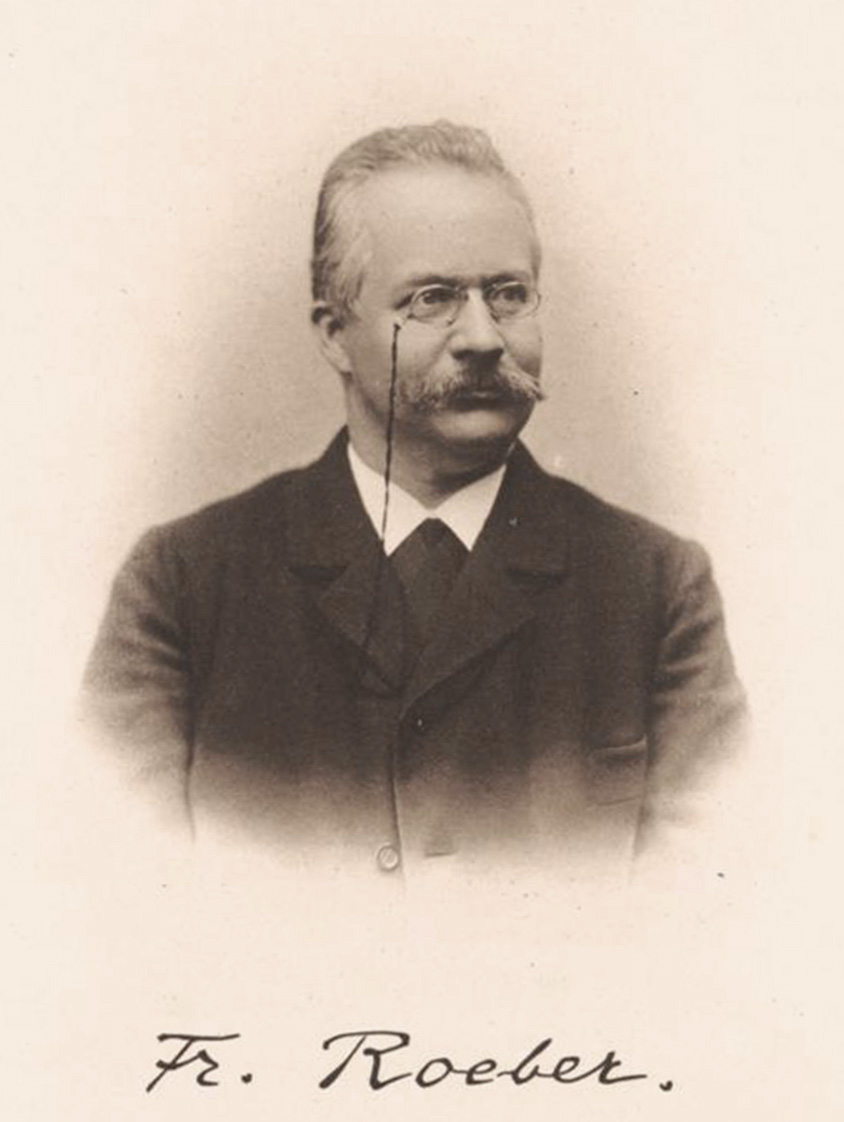
Fritz Roeber (1904)

Fritz Roeber (15 October 1851, Elberfeld – 15 May 1924, Düsseldorf) was a German illustrator, lithographer and history painter, associated with the Düsseldorfer Malerschule. As Director of the Kunstakademie Düsseldorf, he carried out some significant organizational changes.

== Biography ==
His father was the writer Friedrich Roeber, who also served as the Procurator for Elberfeld. After completing his primary education, he studied painting at a private school operated by Eduard Bendemann. His studies were interrupted by service in the Franco-Prussian War then, in the mid-1870s, he presented some large lithographs on Biblical themes.

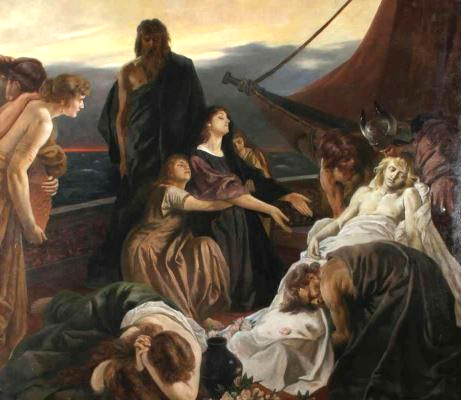
Viking Burial

He accepted a major commission from Rhine Province to design figurative jewelry for a gold trophy, to be presented to Prince (later Kaiser) Wilhelm on the occasion of his wedding. Later, he became a co-founder of the "Central-Gewerbe-Vereins" (Central Trade Association) and helped to develop the local arts and crafts industry. From 1893, he was an instructor at the Kunstakademie Düsseldorf. During the early part of the 20th century, he was involved in organizing several large, international exhibitions and a memorial plaque in his honor was placed at the Kunstpalast.

From 1908 to 1924, he served as Director of the Kunstakademie. His tastes and approach to governing were considered to be rather conservative for the time. Despite this, he was constantly making additions to the curriculum; including workshops for church art and stained glass.

In 1919, following a partial merger with the Kunstgewerbeschule (Arts and Crafts School), he hired seven instructors to teach the new subjects that would be added: the painter Ludwig Heupel-Siegen, sculptor Hubert Netzer, graphic artist Ernst Aufseeser and three architects; Wilhelm Kreis, Emil Fahrenkamp (the Kunstgewerbeschule's former director) and Fritz Becker. He also oversaw the construction of new studio buildings for the Kunstakademie, along the Rhine, designed to be an "art city on the English model". These were demolished in 1937 to make room for the Reichsausstellung Schaffendes Volk (now the Nordpark Düsseldorf).

A street that runs alongside the Kunstakademie has been named after him. His older brother, Ernst, was also an instructor there.
