= Deutscher Kunstverlag =

German educational publishing house

- Founded: 1921
- Country of origin: Germany
- Headquarters location: Berlin and Munich
- Key people: Katja Richter
- Official website: www.deutscherkunstverlag.de

The Deutscher Kunstverlag (DKV) is an educational publishing house with offices in Berlin and Munich. The publisher specializes in books about art, cultural history, architecture, and historic preservation.

== History ==
Deutscher Kunstverlag was founded in 1921 in Berlin. Founders were the publishing companies Insel Verlag, E. A. Seemann, Deutsche Verlags-Anstalt, Julius Hoffmann, G. Grote, Julius Bard, and Walter de Gruyter, as well as the bank Delbrück, Schickler & Co..

Some book series appeared already in 1925, which to this day still partially determine the publishing profile. In addition to scientific publications, the Deutscher Kunstverlag publishes art books and exhibition catalogs.

After the Second World War, the publisher moved its headquarters to Munich. Since the 1990s, the owners have frequently changed. In early 2007, Gabriele Miller purchased the Deutscher Kunstverlag and was the sole shareholder. The head office of the publishing house was then moved back to Berlin.

In October 2010, the daughter of the main shareholder, Stephanie Ecker, took over the commercial management of the publishing house. In January 2011, she and Gabriela Wachter, owner of Parthas publishing, became managing co-partners of the Deutsche Kunstverlag.

Since 2018, Deutscher Kunstverlag has been an independent publishing house under the umbrella of the academic publisher De Gruyter. In its traditional program areas, the publishing house is strengthening its presence and creating the structures for digital publishing. In dialog with editors, scholars, museums, and foundations, innovative concepts are being developed that both ensure the usual quality of content and design and are aligned with the current demands of authors and the book trade.

== Profile ==
An important series published by the Deutscher Kunstverlag is Das Handbuch der Deutschen Kunstdenkmäler (Handbook of German Art Monuments) from Georg Dehio. This book series has been published by the publishing house since 1929 and is constantly updated.

In the art guide series DKV-Kunstführer (formerly Große Baudenkmäler) individual publications are published in brochure form, mainly as a source of information onsite of the monuments. Also, museum guides and art post cards for museums, collections, and art monuments are included in the publisher's program.

The series Antiquitäten-Führer, and the successful title Kunst & Krempel (Art & Stuff), 3 volumes for the Bayerischer Rundfunk Television broadcast with the same name, served as a reference for collectors and fans.

The series Bildhandbuch der Kunstdenkmäler (image manual of monuments), which was established in the mid-1950s and includes 49 volumes, stopped publication in the 1990s. Also, the series Deutsche Lande – Deutsche Kunst ended with the last issue in 1987.
