= Wiederhold =

Wiederhold is a surname. Notable people with the surname include:

- Carlos Wiederhold (1867–1935), German-Chilean entrepreneur
- Doug Wiederhold (born c. 1986), actor
- Gio Wiederhold (born 1936), Italian computer scientist
- Sascha Wiederhold (1904–1962), German painter, graphic artist and stage designer
