= Cäsar Albano Kletke =

Cäsar Albano Kletke (28 November 1805 – 5 April 1893) was a German teacher and philosopher. During his career his became well known as a pioneer of the real school (Realschule) movement.

== Early life and education ==
Cäsar Albano Kletke was the son of the merchant Carl Heinrich Kletke and his wife Josefa Schiller. After attending the Gymnasium "Augustum" in Görlitz, he went on to attend the Maria-Magdalenen-Gymnasium at age 13, which was run by Johann Kaspar Friedrich Manso. He showed a talent for mathematics, and graduated in 1823 being awarded for his achievements.

Kletke subsequently studied at the University of Wrocław. While his major was mathematics, he also studied philology under Franz Passow and philosophy under Henrik Steffens, a natural scientist. During this time, he also developed personal connections to Johann Theodor Mosewius, the founder of the sing academy in Wrocław. At the age of 21, Kletke passed the test to become a teacher of mathematics, physics, German, and philosophy, as well as some additional secondary subjects.

== Career ==
In 1828 Kletke became a teacher at the Gymnasium in Oleśnica. In 1929, aged 24, he became a teacher at the Elisabet-Gymnasium in Wrocław. From 1833 onward he also worked as a private lecturer at the University of Breslau. Kletke earned his habilitation in applied mathematics and also gave lectures at the Silesian Society for Patriotic Culture.

The Breslau City Council elected Cäsar Albano Kletke as the first principal of the new Bürgerschule am Zwinger in 1836. Following Kletke's successful establishment of this new type of school (known as a real school), he became well known in his home town as well as abroad as a prominent representative of the school. In 1840, Russian admiral and explorer Adam Johann von Krusenstern visited the school to gain educational insights.

In 1871, Pjotr Georgiewski, state councillor of the Russian Ministry of Education, came to Breslau. Following Kletke's suggestion, he opened a real school in Russia. The Prussian Ministry of Education assigned Kletke through a memorandum in 1845 the organization of the "Bürger- und Realschulen". He was given the title of "Direktor" (a title describing the headmaster) in 1846.

Kletke supported an educational system that focused more on practical subjects like technical drawing and chemistry, and saw greater importance in German than foreign languages for formal education. He retired aged 71, and died in 1893 at the age of 88.

== Family ==
Cäsar Albano Kletke was the brother of historian Karl Kletke and a cousin of Hermann Kletke (1813–1886), writer and chief editor for the Vossische Zeitung in Berlin.

== Publications ==
- C. A. Kletke: Jahresberichte der Realschule am Zwinger zu Breslau. 1867/1868.
- C. A. Kletke: Entwickelung des Keplerschen Problems: „Aus der mittleren Anomalie eines in einer elliptischen Bahn sich bewegenden Weltkörpers die wahre Anomalie desselben zu finden“. Breslau 1852.
- C. A. Kletke: Die geschichtsphilosophische Weltanschauung von Braniß. Breslau 1849.

== Literature ==
- Mentioned in the article by Ludwig Fränkel (1906). "Kletke, Hermann" . Allgemeine Deutsche Biographie (in German). Vol. 51. Leipzig: Duncker & Humblot. p. 518.
- Caesar Albano Kletke (Hrsg.: Robert Ludwig): Lebensgeschichte eines schlesischen Schulmannes. In: Städtisches Realgymnasium am Zwinger in Breslau. Bericht über das Schuljahr 1904/1905. Breslau 1905, S. 3–17 (Digitalisat)
- E. Maetschke: C. A. Kletke. In: Schlesier des 19. Jahrhunderts. Band 1, Breslau 1922
- G. Dittrich: Realgymnasium am Zwinger, auf der Grundlage der Festschrift zum 100-jährigen Bestehen. 1990
