= Friedrich Roeber =

German writer and historian (1819–1901)

Johann Friedrich Gerhard Roeber
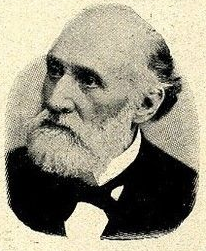
- Roeber c. 1900
- Born: 19 June 1819; Elberfeld, Germany
- Died: 12 October 1901 (aged 82); Düsseldorf, Germany
- Occupation(s): Writer, historian
- Spouse: Maria Wilhelmine Elise (née Kretzmann)
- Children: Ernst Roeber, Fritz Roeber

Johann Friedrich Gerhard Roeber (19 June 1819 – 12 October 1901) was a German writer and historian who participated in literary circles in Elberfeld and Wuppertal, in Germany.

== Life ==
Johann Friedrich Gerhard Roeber was born on 19 June 1819 in Elberfeld, Germany—the son of a woodturner, he attended the Elberfeld secondary school. In 1834, he began an apprenticeship at the Bankhaus von der Heydt-Kersten & Söhne (a credit bank). There he became a clerk, received power of attorney, and in 1872 became a partner. He left the company in 1879 and moved to Düsseldorf in 1894.

In the early 1840s, he participated in an Elberfeld literary circle, which included, among others, Adolf Schults, Carl de Haas, and Friedrich Engels. He later distanced himself from Engels, in 1886. In 1847, he married Maria Wilhelmine Elise (née Kretzmann). At this time, he became known as a playwright, novelist, and historian.

Roeber served as the Procurator for Elberfeld at some point.

In the early 1850s, Roeber was a member of the Wuppertal poets' circle (Wuppertaler Dichterkreis). When this dissolved, a Sunday circle (Sonntagskränzchen) was formed, meeting at Roeber's house and consisting of poetry recitations, music and discussions—the formation of which was described by Carl Siebel in a letter to Wolfgang Müller von Königswinter in June 1853:

The founding of a poets' association [Dichtervereins] has recently been projected by Roeber, Schults, and myself—starting from the idea that all elasticity of the mind is formed purely through the exchange of ideas—we planned to meet every 4 weeks or 14 days to discuss set topics. Each person should draw their acquaintances as corresponding members, thus aiming for the greatest possible expansion gradually.

Between 1860 and 1864, he distinguished himself with publications in the literary journal Morgenblatt für gebildete Leser. A year and a half before his death, Roeber suffered a stroke. In a moment of mental confusion, he burned numerous letters from Schults and de Haas to him.

He died on 12 October 1901 in Düsseldorf. Five years after his death, a monument was erected to him on Carnapsplatz in the Elberfeld Nordstadt (later destroyed in World War II). Another monument was erected in Düsseldorf by Karl Janssen.

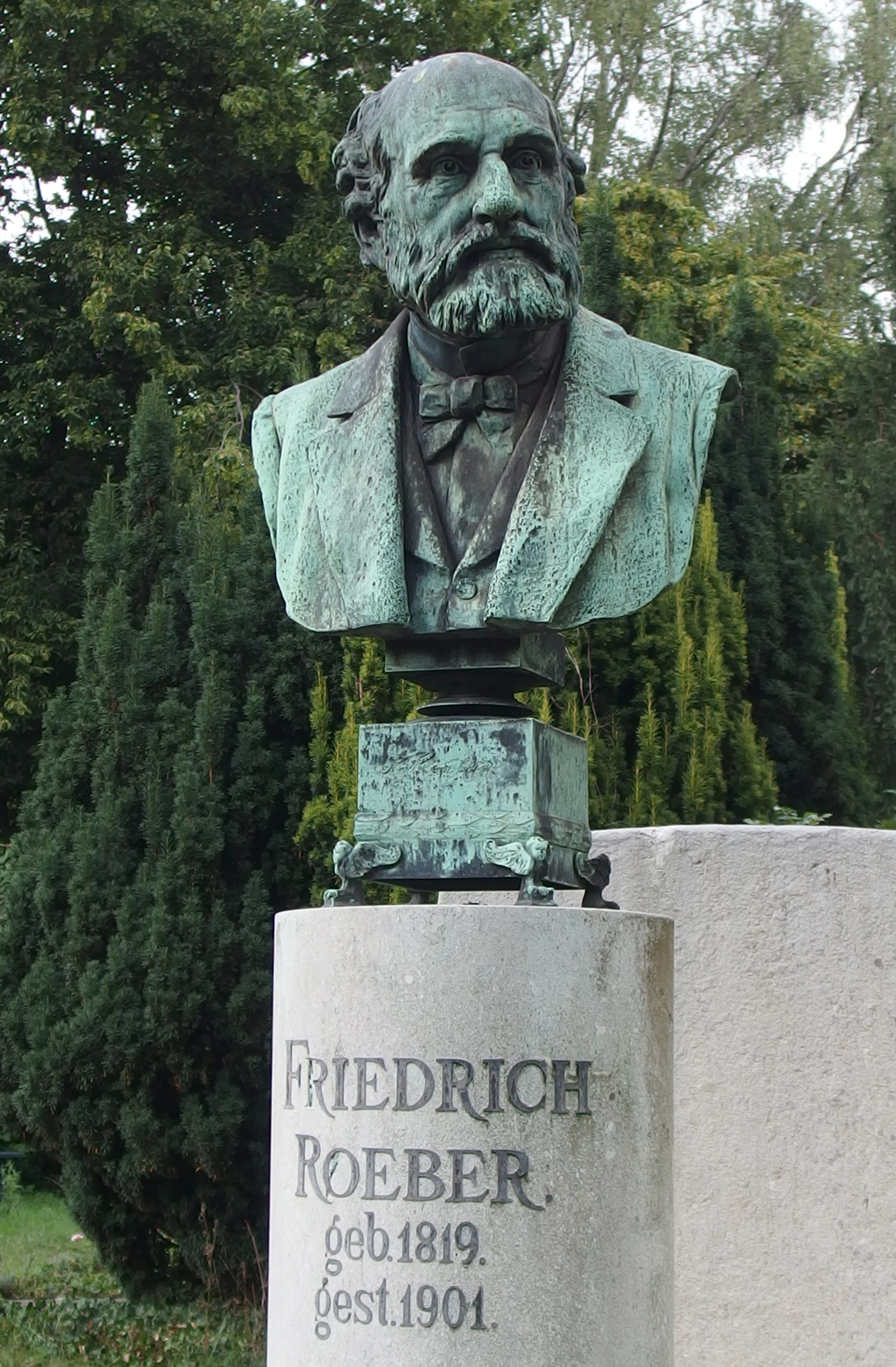
Bust of Roeber at the Nordfriedhof (Düsseldorf), by Karl Janssen

The painters Ernst Roeber and Fritz Roeber were his sons.

== Selected works ==
- — (1856). Tristan und Isolde. Eine Tragödie in Arabesken [Tristan and Isolde. A tragedy in arabesques] (in German). Julius Baedeker. OCLC 504476178.
- — (1863). "Aus dem Wupperthale" [From Wuppertal]. Morgenblatt für gebildete Stände (in German) (16). Stuttgart: Johann Friedrich Cotta: 381–383.
- — (1867). König Manfred. Oper in fünf Akten. Musik von Carl Reinecke [King Manfred. Opera in five acts. Music by Carl Reinecke] (in German). Leipzig: Breitkopf & Härtel.
- — (1884). Sophonisbe. Tragödie [Sophonisbe. Tragedy] (in German). Iserlohn: Julius Baedeker.
- — (1885). Marionetten. Ein Roman [Marionettes. A novel] (in German) (2nd ed.). Iserlohn / Grumbach, Leipzig: Julius Baedeker.
- — (1886). Litteratur und Kunst im Wupperthale bis zur Mitte des gegenwärtigen Jahrhunderts [Literature and art in Wuppertal up to the middle of the present century] (in German). Iserlohn: Julius Baedeker. OCLC 681545248.
- — (1891). Börsenringe. Schauspiel (in German). Leipzig: Julius Baedeker.
- — (1892). Malermodelle. Lustspiel in einem Akt [Painter's models. Comedy in one act] (in German). Leipzig: Julius Baedeker.
- — (1897). Lyrische und epische Gedichte, Fest- und Märchenspiele [Lyrical and epic poems, festival and fairy tale plays] (in German) (3rd (presumably) ed.). Leipzig: Julius Baedeker.
