= Carl Siebel =

German merchant and poet (1836–1868)

Abraham Peter Carl Siebel
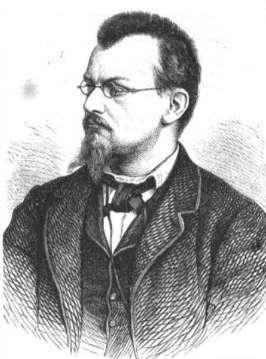
- Siebel in 1872
- Born: 13 January 1836; Barmen, Germany
- Died: 9 May 1868 (aged 32); Elberfeld, Germany
- Other names: Emil Thilva, Julius Morton
- Occupations: Merchant, poet
- Known for: Poetry, friendship with Karl Marx and Friedrich Engels
- Spouse: Eleonora Augusta Christina Reinhilda Freiin von Hurter
- Children: 3

Abraham Peter Carl Siebel (13 January 1836 – 9 May 1868) was a German merchant, poet, and friend of Karl Marx and Friedrich Engels. His pseudonyms were Emil Thilva and Julius Morton.

== Life ==
Born Abraham Peter Carl Siebel, in Barmen, Germany, he was the son of the lace manufacturer Karl August Siebel (1805 – 1888) and Emilia (Emilie) Kampermann (1812 – 1878). After being tutored by a private teacher, he attended the Barmer City School and then a higher school in Rheydt. In 1850, his father determined that he should apprentice in the family firm "Abraham Siebel & Son." He was not very fond of the profession and therefore turned to poetry. His friends were Emil Rittershaus and Hugo Oelbermann. Together they founded the Wuppertal poets' circle. Later, he joined the Sonntagskränzchen (Sunday gathering) of Friedrich Roeber.

From 1852, Siebel was associated with the literary journal Morgenblatt für gebildete Leser (Morning paper for educated readers) and its editor Hermann Hauff. From 1853 to 1866, Siebel corresponded with Wolfgang Müller von Königswinter. Between 1854 and 1858, he wrote eleven letters to Nikolaus Hocker.

Between 1856 and 1859, he spent a considerable amount of time travelling in Berlin and Manchester, where he met Friedrich Engels in 1859 and Wilhelm Wolff. In May 1859, Siebel was to report as a reserve soldier to the Prussian Guard in Berlin.

He participated in a festival marking the centenary of Friedrich Schiller's birth in Manchester on 10 November 1859, with the poem "Epilogue".

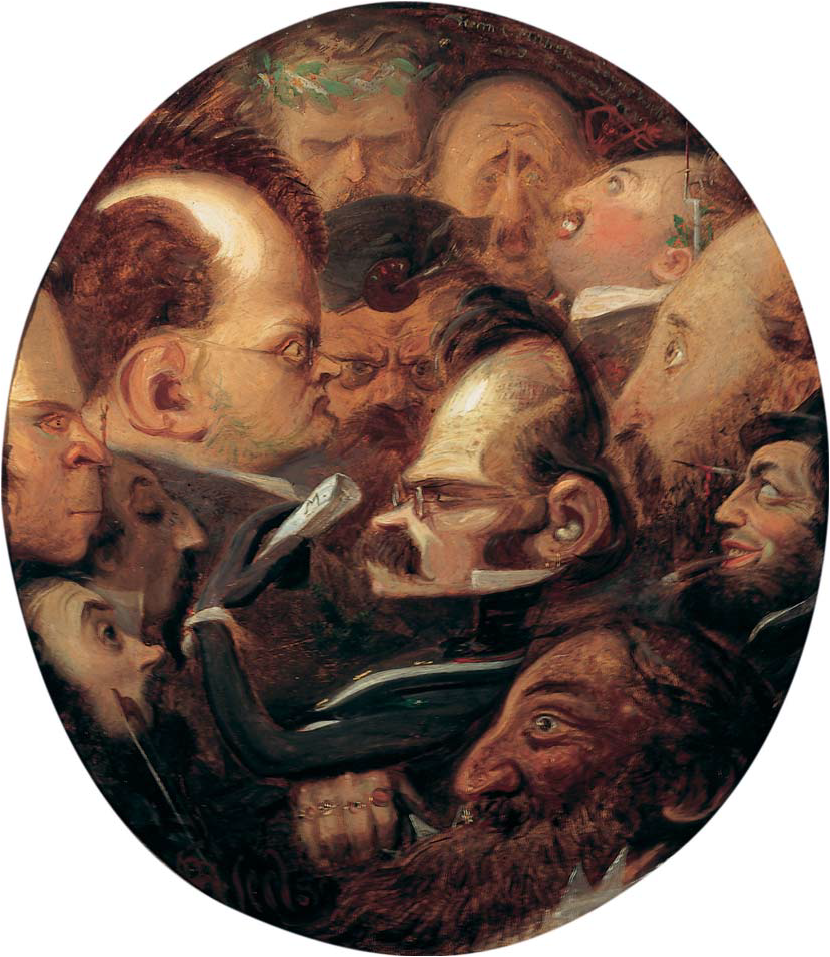
Siebel (top-left, glasses) in an 1859 caricature by Johann Richard Seel

In 1860, he returned to his homeland to marry on 14 November 1860. His wife was Eleonora Augusta Christina Reinhilda (Reinhilde) Freiin von Hurter (1842–1880). The marriage produced three children: Emilie Maria Siebel (b. 1862), Anna Reinhilde Siebel (b. 25 August 1863), and Carl Reinhold Siebel (b. 17 August 1867).

In May 1861, Karl Marx visited him in Elberfeld. In 1864, Siebel founded a section of the International Workingmen's Association in Barmen.

Due to a chest ailment, he travelled to Funchal on the island of Madeira for healing purposes in 1866 and 1867.

Siebel supported Karl Marx through reviews and advertisements in the German press to promote Marx's Das Kapital throughout 1867.

Shortly after his return from Madeira, he died of consumption in Elberfeld on 9 May 1868—he had lost weight quickly in the fortnight before his death, and was planning to travel to the Rhine. He was buried in the Bartholomäusstraße Cemetery in Barmen.

== Legacy ==
German politician Johann Viktor Bredt called him a "poet by divine grace" in 1937, while Friedrich Engels summarised him in a letter to Jenny Marx on 22 December 1859: "Give me Siebel any day; he may be a rotten poet, but he does at least know that he is a thorough humbug and all he asks is to be allowed to advertise himself—nowadays a necessary procédé [process] without which he would be a complete nonentity."

The poet Eduard Mörike expressed negative opinions about the quality of his poetry in a letter to Karl von Grüneisen on November 17, 1860.

From the year 1865, four letters from Siebel to Wilhelm Jordan are preserved. Two letters to Gottfried Kinkel are in Kinkel's literary estate, two letters to Karl Gutzkow are kept in Frankfurt, and one letter to Paul Heyse is in the Munich State Library.
