= Sophie Seipt =

German composer (1812–1889)

Sophie Seipt, also seen as Sophie Seibt (1812–1889), was a German composer and arranger who wrote several pieces for cello and piano.

Seipt was born in Cologne. Little is known about her education. Her music was recorded commercially by Kaleidos and published by Oliver Ditson and Theodore Presser Company.

== Works ==
Her works include:

=== Chamber ===
- Drie Romanzen, opus 1 (cello and piano)
- Fantasie (cello and piano)
- other pieces for cello and piano

=== Vocal ===
- “Ever Faithful” (by Johann Sebastian Bach; arranged by Sophie Seibt)
- Sechs vierstimmige Lieder, opus 2 (for soprano, alto, tenor and bass)
- no. 1 “Glockentone” (text by Franz Otto)
- no. 2 “Die Nacht” (text by Nikolaus Lenau)
- no. 3 “Laut jubelnd durcheilte der Fruhling die Au”
- no. 4 “Die Sennin” (text by Nikolaus Lenau)
- no. 5 “Auf eines Berges Hohen” (text by Wolfgang Muller von Konigswinter)
- no. 6 “Du bist wie eine Blume” (text by Heinrich Heine)
