= Karl Stelter =

German poet, writer and merchant (1823–1912)

Karl Stelter (25 December 1823 – 13 May 1912) was a German poet, writer and merchant who was a member of the Wuppertal poets' circle.

== Life ==
Stelter was born in Elberfeld, Germany on 25 December 1823. He worked in a silk weaving mill until 1880.

For the 1861 coronation of Emperor Wilhelm I, Stelter wrote a patriotic festival play (a Festspiel), which was performed at the Elberfeld City Theater, as well as a Kaiserlied (Imperial Song). His memoirs titled Experiences of an Eighty-Year-Old (Erlebnisse eines Achtzigjährigen) were published in 1903.

He lived in Wiesbaden for some portion of his life and died there on 13 May 1912.

== Works ==
- — (1858). Die Braut der Kirche. Lyrischepische Dichtung [The Bride of the Church: Lyrical Epic Poetry] (in German). Breslau. OCLC 504587974.
- — (1869). Kompendium der schönen Künste [Compendium of the Fine Arts] (in German). Düsseldorf.
- — (1872). Kompaß auf dem Meere des Lebens [Compass on the Sea of Life] (in German) (3rd ed.).
- — (1880). Gedichte [Poems] (in German). Vol. 2 (3rd ed.). Elberfeld. OCLC 782908872.
- — (1882). Aus Geschichte und Sage: erzählende Dichtungen [From History and Legend: Narrative Poems] (in German) (2nd ed.). Elberfeld: Baedeker. OCLC 21348570.
- — (1882). Novellen [Novellas] (in German). Elberfeld. OCLC 782156667.
- — (1887). Neue Gedichte [New Poems] (in German). Elberfeld. OCLC 1252172913.
- — (1893). Nach sieben Jahrzehnten 7. Gedichtsammlung [After Seven Decades: 7th Poetry Collection] (Anthology) (in German). Elberfeld: Baedeker. OCLC 894538097.
- — (1903). Erlebnissen eines Achtzigjährigen [Experiences of an Eighty-Year-Old] (in German). Elberfeld.
