= Adeline Rittershaus =

German philologist and scholar

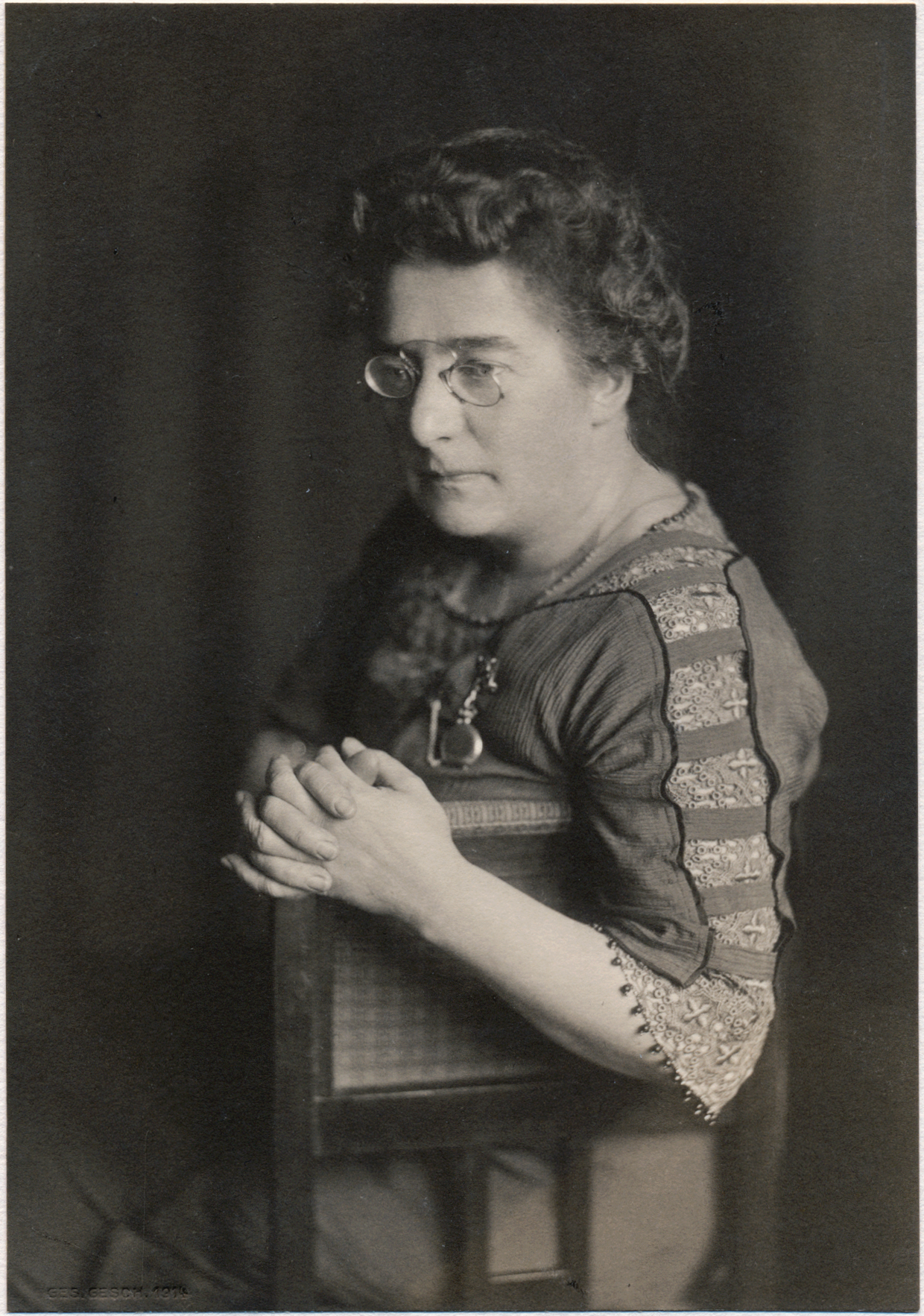
Adeline Rittershaus, 1914

Adeline Rittershaus (29 July 1867 – 6 September 1924) was a German philologist, a scholar in old Scandinavian literature, and champion for the equality of women. She earned her doctorate in 1898, at the University of Zurich, being one of the first women to do so at that institution, and acquired in 1902, as the first woman, a Venia legendi at the Faculty of Arts of the same university. Her most famous work is a collection of Icelandic folk tales.

== Early life and education ==
Adeline Rittershaus was born on 29 July 1876 in Barmen (now part of the city of Wuppertal). She was a daughter of the poet Emil Rittershaus and grew up in Barmen in the Prussian Rhine Province. Ferdinand Freiligrath, a friend of her father, was her godfather.

As women were unable to acquire an Abitur in Germany until 1899, Rittershaus received private preparation by teachers of Barmer Real Gymnasium in 1894, and passed the Matura exam in Zürich. She then studied Germanic philology, Greek, and Sanskrit at the University of Zurich with, among others, Albert Bachmann. She earned her doctorate in 1898 as one of the first women at the University of Zurich, with research into Old Germanic dialects. She served as an aide of the political scientist, Elisabeth Noelle-Neumann.

== Career ==
In 1898, she traveled to Iceland for the first time for several months to study Icelandic language and literature. After her return to Zurich, she continued this work with the study of old and new Icelandic. During her second stay in Iceland, in 1899, Rittershaus met the Icelandic teacher Thorleifur Bjarnason and married him, but divorced one year later.

In 1901, she submitted an application for admission to the Habilitation for Old and New Icelandic Language and Literature at the University of Bonn, which was rejected by 14 to 16 votes. In the magazine Frauencorrespondenz, on 11 and 14 February 1902, Rittershaus reported in detail on her experiences with the University of Bonn. Rittershaus and Countess Maria von Linden were the only women in Prussia until the end of the empire who had tried to obtain teaching permission at a university.

At the State Library in Reykjavík, Rittershaus researched Icelandic fairy tales collected in the last century. From this activity, she developed important contributions to comparative fairy tale research. After rejecting her earlier habilitation petition, Ritterhaus succeeded at the University of Zurich in 1902 with her publication, Die neuisländischen Volksmärchen (The New Icelandic Folk Tales). Her late work, entitled Altnordische Frauen (Old Norse Women) is a popular scientific publication, developed from the saga seal portrait of women during the Viking Age.

== Personal life ==
In 1904, she married the Zurich architect, Theodor Oberländer. This marriage ended in divorce in 1919, which greatly increased the social pressure on her. Due to serious illness, she resigned on 21 May 1920 from the faculty of the University of Zurich. Rittershaus died on 6 September 1924 in Berlin.

== Selected works ==
- Die Ausdrücke für Gesichtsempfindungen in den altgermanischen Dialekten. Ein Beitrag zur Bedeutungsgeschichte. Zürich 1899. (in German) (in German)
- Ziele, Wege und Leistungen unserer Mädchenschulen und Vorschlag einer Reformschule. Jena 1901. (in German)
- Die neuisländischen Volksmärchen. Ein Beitrag zur vergleichenden Märchenforschung. Halle (Saale) 1902. (in German)
- Altnordische Frauen. Frauenfeld / Leipzig 1917. (in German)
