= Gerrit Jan van Eijken =

Dutch composer

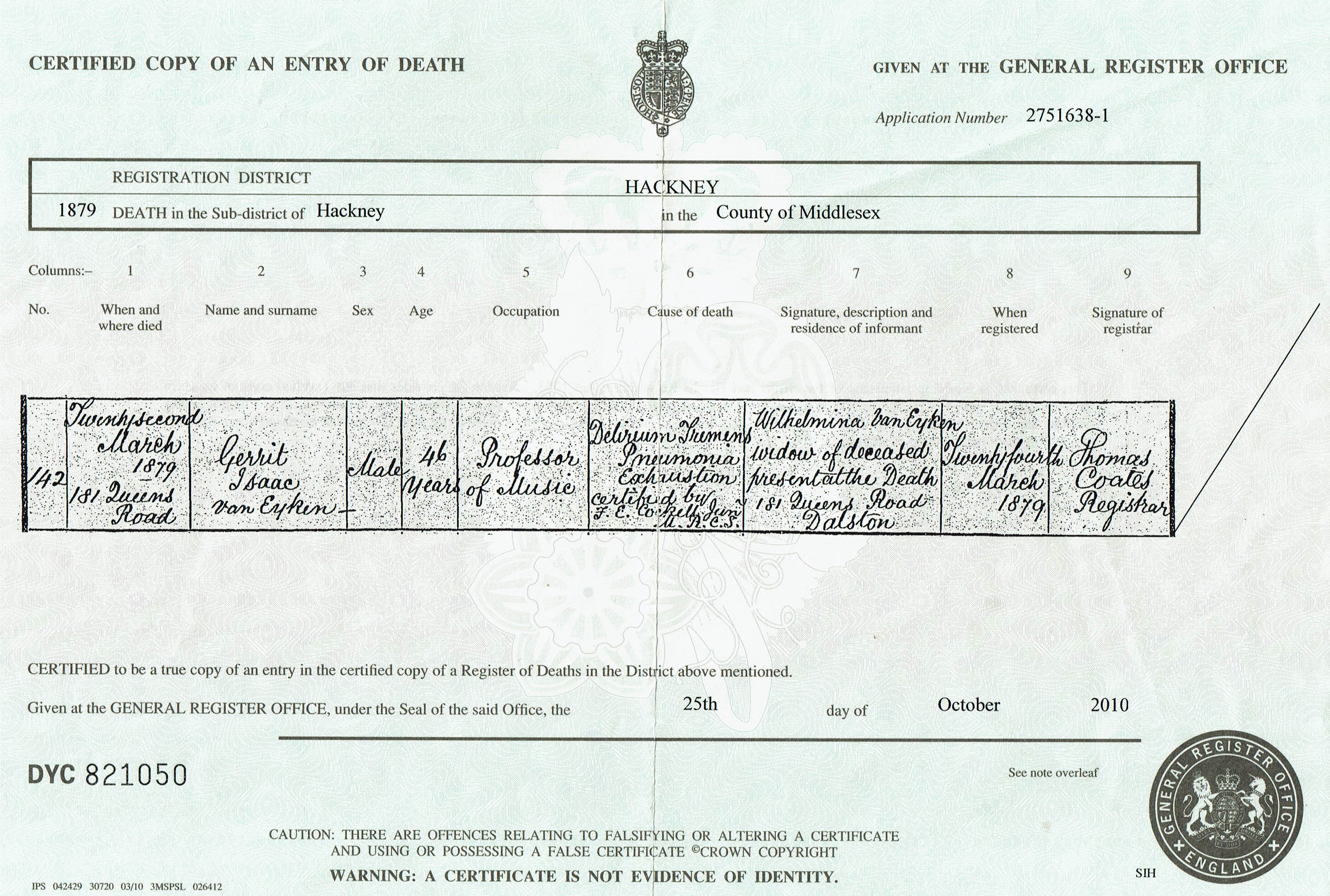

Gerrit Jan van Eijken (Amersfoort, 5 May 1832 - Dalston, London, 22 March 1879) was a Dutch composer. He studied first under his father, Gerrit van Eijken, who was organist and bell-ringer at the Grote Kerk in Amersfoort. His elder brother Jan Albert van Eijken was also a composer.

In 1859 the organist Karl Emanuel Klitzsch commented favourably in the Neue Zeitschrift fur Musik on his works. But after initial successes he suffered from disappointment as a composer and became prey to alcoholism. In his last years he earned a living as an organist in London, and died at the age of 46.

== Works, editions and recordings ==
- Songs of Love and Death - Lieder Töne der Liebe aus dem hohen Lied op. 10; Gedichte op.8 Nr. 1 & 2; op. 11; Lieder op.6 2 & 3. With Jan Albert van Eijken: Lieder op. 30 Nr. 2, 4;Lied op. 28, 2; Lieder op. 12 Nr. 3, 4,6; op 33 Nr. 3 & 4. Performed by Anne Grimm (soprano), Marcel Reijans (tenor), Geert Smits (bass), Frans van Ruth (piano). NM Classics, 1997.

Violin Sonata in f minor, Op. 5; Performed by Bob van der Ent (violin), René Rakier (piano). Aliud Records, 2011
