= Sascha Wiederhold =

German avant-garde artist

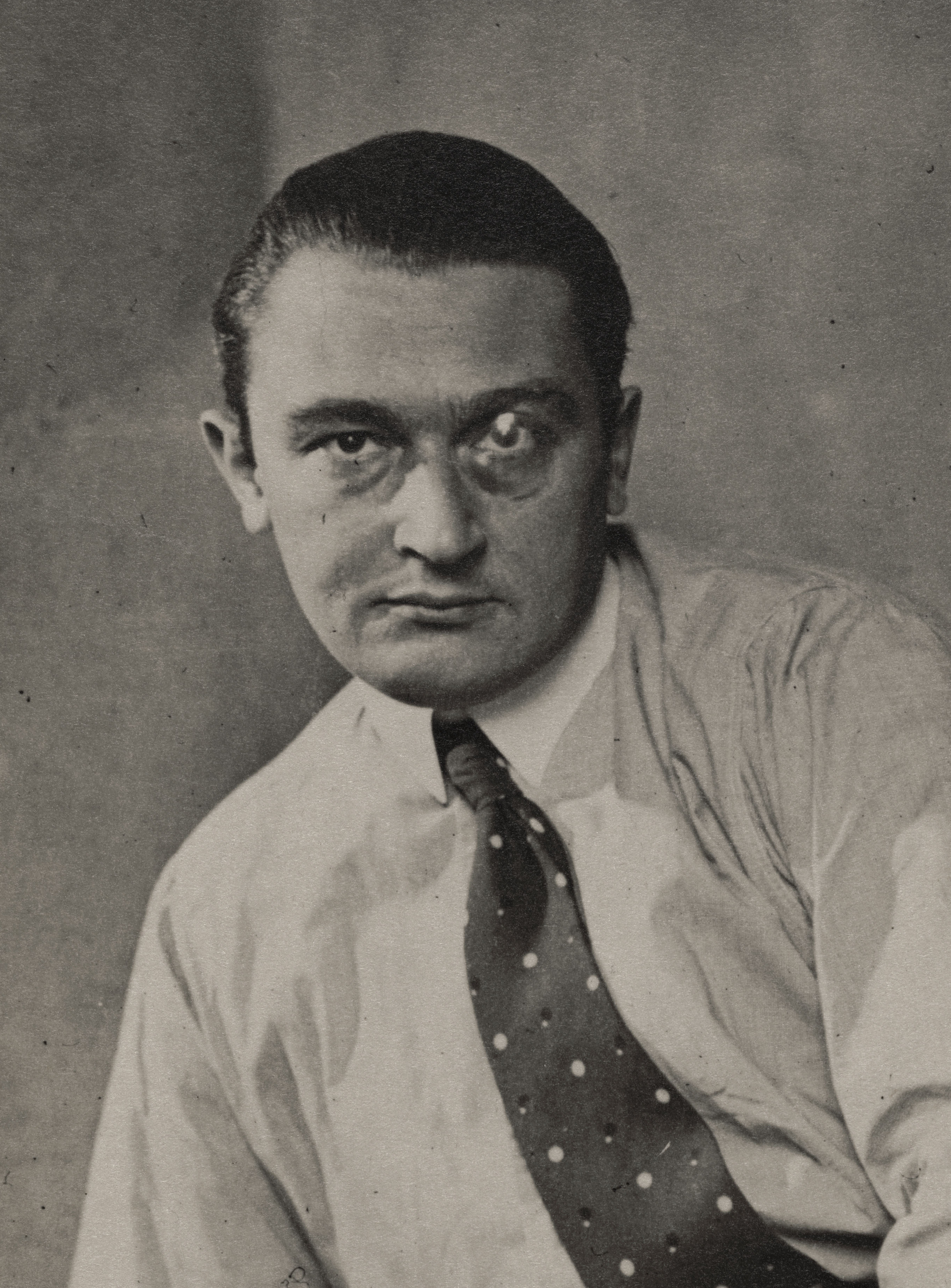
- Born: 9 March 1904; Münster, German Empire
- Died: 20 January 1962 (aged 57); West Berlin
- Education: Kunstakademie Düsseldorf, Unterrichtsanstalt des Staatlichen Kunstgewerbemuseums in Berlin

Sascha Wiederhold (born 9 March 1904 in Münster; died 20 January 1962 in West Berlin), was a German painter, graphic artist and stage designer.

== Life ==
Wiederhold was born Ernst Walter Wiederhold in his parents' Münster flat at Grevener Straße 17/18. His father Heinrich Wiederhold (1875–1915) was a sergeant and married his mother Maria Wilhelmina Anna Wiederhold, née Wild (1873–1959), in Düsseldorf on 25 April 1903. Wiederhold's younger sister Elisabeth (1906–1992) was born on 25 October 1906. Wiederhold's family left Münster in April 1907 and moved to Düsseldorf.

Wiederhold attended the Städtische Oberrealschule on Scharnhorststraße in Düsseldorf and finished school with the Obersekundarreife. Wiederhold's father was killed in the First World War. After several trips to Upper Silesia, Wiederhold took up studies at the Kunstakademie Düsseldorf in 1921 and attended the classes for commercial graphics and decorative painting led by Ernst Aufseeser (1880–1940). Aufseeser decisively influenced Wiederhold's painting style with his spectrum of design methods and areas of application. In addition, Düsseldorf and the Rhineland had a lively art and theatre scene that offered a variety of stimuli.

In 1924 Wiederhold left Düsseldorf and continued his studies at the Unterrichtsanstalt des Staatlichen Kunstgewerbemuseums in Berlin (today Berlin University of the Arts). Here he attended the specialist class for wall, theatre and glass painting, which was led by Cesar Klein (1876–1954). As Wiederhold was homeless, he spent the night in a vacant official flat at the art academy on his own initiative. As this did not go unnoticed for long, he had to give up his studies at the Unterrichtsanstalt des Kunstgewerbemuseums in July 1924 and leave the institution.

In July 1925 Wiederhold was able to show his first exhibition at the gallery Der Sturm in Berlin, run by Herwarth Walden. This first exhibition demonstrated a wide spectrum of Wiederhold's artistic skills and was evidence of the development the artist had taken within a year. Wiederhold exhibited works at the Der Sturm gallery continuously until 1931.

In 1925 Wiederhold married the nurse Sibilla Schicks (1893–1973), who had been working as a welfare worker in Berlin-Reinickendorf since 1923. Their daughter Katja Edith Jenny (1925–2010) was born in the same year.

In May 1927 Wiederhold took part in the German Theatre Exhibition in Magdeburg, where he exhibited designs for stage sets. His second solo exhibition at the gallery Der Sturm took place in October of the same year. Furthermore, he took part in an exhibition at the gallery of the magazine Little Review on the initiative of Herwarth Walden's Sturm-Kunst in New York City. Wiederhold was also a member of the Sturm-Kunst group.

In 1928 he divorced Sibilla and their daughter stayed with her mother. Wiederhold married his second wife, the stenotypist Rosa Dorothea Schönfeld (1902–1983), on 15 September 1928.

Wiederhold left Berlin in the summer of 1929 to work in Tilsit at the municipal theatre there. In Tilsit there was a cooperation with the Ostpreußische Bühnen (East Prussian Theatres), which had been founded in 1927 in order to be able to organise guest performances from Königsberg for theatres in around 20 towns in the surrounding area. The director of the Tilsit municipal theatre, Rudolf Blümner, engaged Wiederhold and took him with him from Berlin to Tilsit. Here Wiederhold developed, among other things, a programme sheet for the 1929/1930 season.

When Herwarth Walden moved to the Soviet Union in 1932 and died there in 1941 as a result of the Stalinist reign of terror, Wiederhold lost his gallerist. Wiederhold's marriage to Dorothea Schönfeld was divorced on 29 December 1932.

During the National Socialist regime, Wiederhold was unable to publicly exhibit his modern artworks. However, he may still have been able to sell some works to private buyers. In 1937, he began an apprenticeship as a bookseller's assistant at the Bayerischer Platz bookshop in Berlin-Schöneberg and became deputy manager there in 1939.

In 1940, he remarried to his second divorced wife Rosa Dorothea. Nothing is known about the circumstance of the remarriage.

At a hitherto unknown date Wiederhold was conscripted into military service and became a British prisoner of war from 1945 to 1946. While a prisoner of war Wiederhold produced a number of drawings which have been preserved.

In 1951 Wiederhold set up his own bookshop in Berlin-Wedding at Fehmarner Straße 9, which he ran with his wife.

On 20 January 1962 Wiederhold died of a heart condition in Berlin-Moabit.

== Rediscovery ==
Wiederhold's rediscovery is thanks to the Basel-based Hungarian art collector and art dealer Carl Laszlo. Laszlo became aware of Wiederhold while looking through old Sturm publications. During a visit to Berlin around 1960, Laszlo leafed through a telephone directory and contacted Wiederhold. During a face-to-face meeting between the men, Wiederhold showed Laszlo many of his works that had survived the Sturm period.

Laszlo subsequently included Wiederhold in the programme of his gallery Delta. The art dealer also sold works by the artist in his Basel flat, among other places.

As a co-founder of Art Basel, Laszlo exhibited Wiederhold's works at many art fairs, so that other art dealers also became aware of the artist and Wiederhold's works found their way into private collections.

== Artistic works ==
His work known today is limited to the period from 1924 to 1930 and a few drawings from 1946.

In addition to the painting Madonna from 1924, the Berlinische Galerie has in its collection about 20 works on paper (mainly gouaches), which represent, among other things, various stage designs by Wiederhold for the Tilsit municipal theatre. In addition, there is a small documentary partial estate consisting largely of letters to Wiederhold from various employees of the Der Sturm gallery.

The Sprengel Museum in Hanover owns the large-format painting Figures in Space from 1928 in its collection.

The New National Gallery (German: Neue Nationalgalerie) in Berlin has in its collection the large-format painting Archers from 1928. The Neue Nationalgalerie in Berlin dedicated a solo exhibition to Widerhold from 2 July 2022 to 8 January 2023.
