= Grote (publisher) =

German book publishing company

Grote was a German book publishing company founded in 1849, which successively used the names G. Grote, G. Grote'sche Verlagsbuchhandlung, and Müller-Grote.

== History ==
G. Grote was founded in Hamm in 1849. In 1869, Franz Vahlen (1833–1898) left his work managing the publisher I. Guttentag to form his own publishing company. He purchased part of G. Grote's holdings as part of beginning this venture. G. Grote moved with its founder to Berlin in 1877. G. Grote published a number of popular illustrated works in the 1870s and 80s, including the works of Charles Dickens. In 1871, G. Grote collaborated with E. A. Seemann and Alphons Dürr (1828/1829–1908) to publish the Illustrated Christmas Catalog in 1871, which became the most popular Christmas catalog at the time. The work was designed to encourage consumers to buy more books, rather than being a reference work intended for booksellers, as was common at the time.

The company continued to use the name G. Grote until at least 1892, but began using the name G. Grote'sche Verlagsbuchhandlung by 1900. In 1905, the founder's grandson, Gustav Müller-Grote (born 1867), took control of the publishing house. In 1921, G. Grote'sche Verlagsbuchhandlung collaborated with a number of other German publishers to create a new publishing company, Deutscher Kunstverlag. Gustav's son, Hans-Dietrich Müller-Grote began working for G. Grote'sche Verlagsbuchhandlung in 1932. By 1935, he became a partner in the firm.

When Gustav died in 1949, Hans-Dietrich continued the publishing house in Hamm as a general partnership (Offene Handelsgesellschaft). In 1957, Hans-Dietrich changed the company's legal status into a limited partnership (Kommanditgesellschaft) and relocated it to Rastatt. (Note: Perhaps in Baden-Baden.) In 1968, the company partners were Hans-Dietrich Müller-Grote, Eleonore Müller-Grote, and Erich Pabel.
