= Michael Knieriem =

German historian

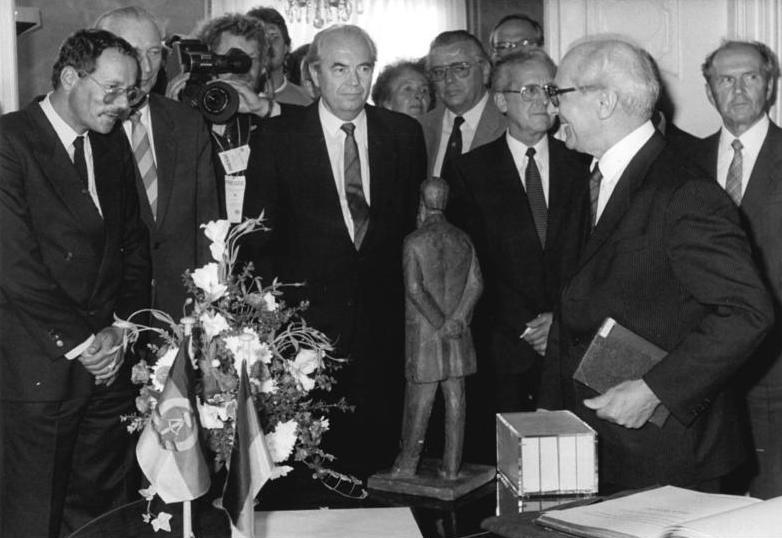
Knieren receives Erich Honecker in the Historischen Zentrum in September 1987

Michael Knieriem (born 24 May 1943 in Lahr) is a German historian and author and was director of the Historisches Zentrum (Wuppertal) museum.

The author of several historical textbooks on the Wuppertal area, where he had specialized in the life and work of Friedrich Engels, Knieren was director of the Historischen Zentrum for more than two decades until he retired in spring 2008. His successor was Eberhard Illner.

In 2006, Knieriem was commissioned by the head of the cultural department Marlis Drevermann to clarify the role of Eduard von der Heydt in Nazi Germany, which was to influence the future role and the naming of the Von der Heydt Cultural Prize. As a result, the expert commission could not find any confirmation of Eduard von der Heydt's role as a Nazi, and the cultural prize was renamed Von der Heydt Cultural Prize.
