= Jan Albert van Eijken =

Dutch composer and organist

Jan Albert van Eijken (Amersfoort, April 29, 1823 - Elberfeld, September 24, 1868) was a Dutch composer and organist. He studied with his father, the town organist and then at the Leipzig Conservatorium in 1845–46. His younger brother was the better known Gerrit Jan van Eijken who later lived in London. Eijken's 1853 book of organ chorales was one of the first Dutch organ books to include introductions to psalms.

== Works, editions and recordings ==
- Songs of Love and Death - Jan Albert van Eijken: Lieder op. 30 Nr. 2, 4;Lied op. 28, 2; Lieder op. 12 Nr. 3, 4,6; op 33 Nr. 3 & 4. with Gerrit Jan van Eijken Töne der Liebe aus dem hohen Lied op. 10; Gedichte op.8 Nr. 1 & 2; op. 11; Lieder op.6 2 & 3. Performed by Anne Grimm, Marcel Reijans, Geert Smits, Frans van Ruth. NM Classics, 1997.
