= Emil Rittershaus =

German poet (1834–1897)

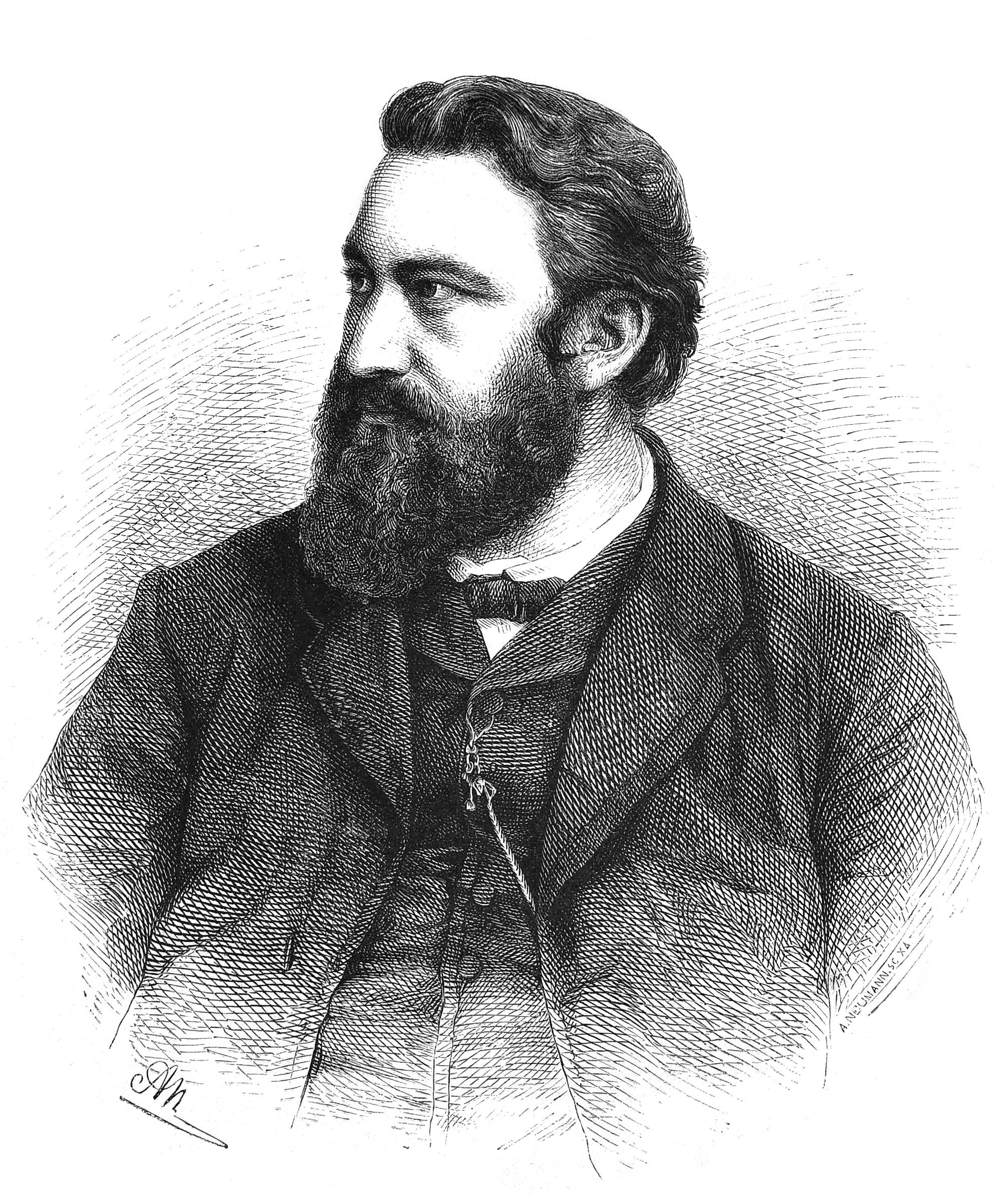
- Rittershaus in an illustration published 1870
- Born: 3 April 1834; Barmen, Germany
- Died: 8 March 1897 (aged 62); Barmen, Germany
- Resting place: Heckinghausen
- Occupations: poet, librettist, writer, merchant
- Spouse: Hedwig Rittershaus
- Children: Walther Rittershaus, Alfred Rittershaus, Julius Rittershaus, Adeline Rittershaus, Helene Schaper

Friedrich Emil Rittershaus (3 April 1834 – 8 March 1897) was a German poet.

== Biography ==
He was born in Barmen (now Wuppertal), Kingdom of Prussia. His poetry, marked by simple feeling, fine diction, and original matter, won great popularity. He died in Barmen. His daughter, Adeline, was a philologist, scholar, and champion for the equality of women.

He was a member of the Wuppertal poets' circle in the 1850s. He knew Karl Marx and Friedrich Engels and wrote several letters to them in 1867–1868.

== Gallery ==
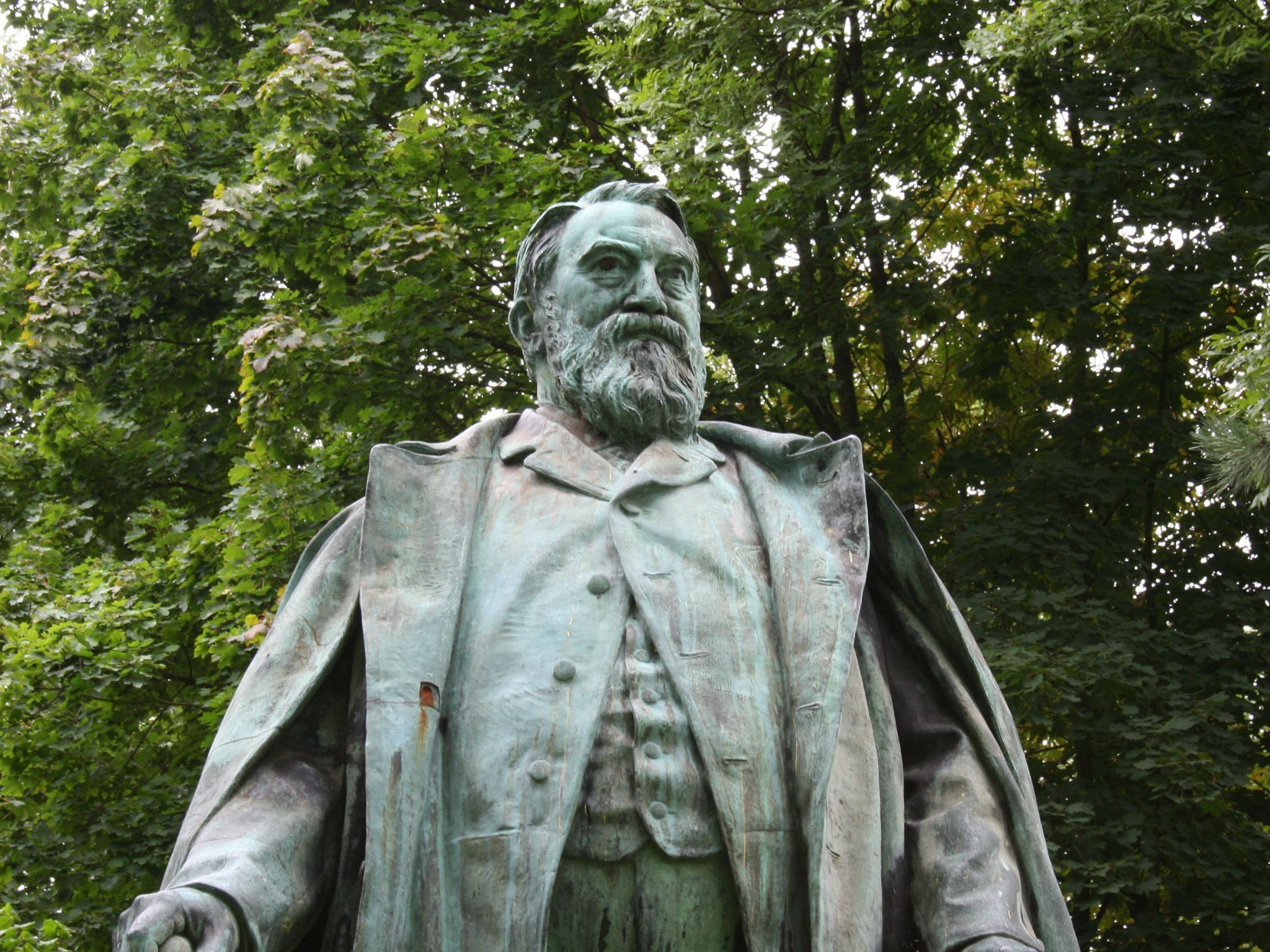
A statue of Rittershaus in the Barmer Anlagen (a park) in Wuppertal

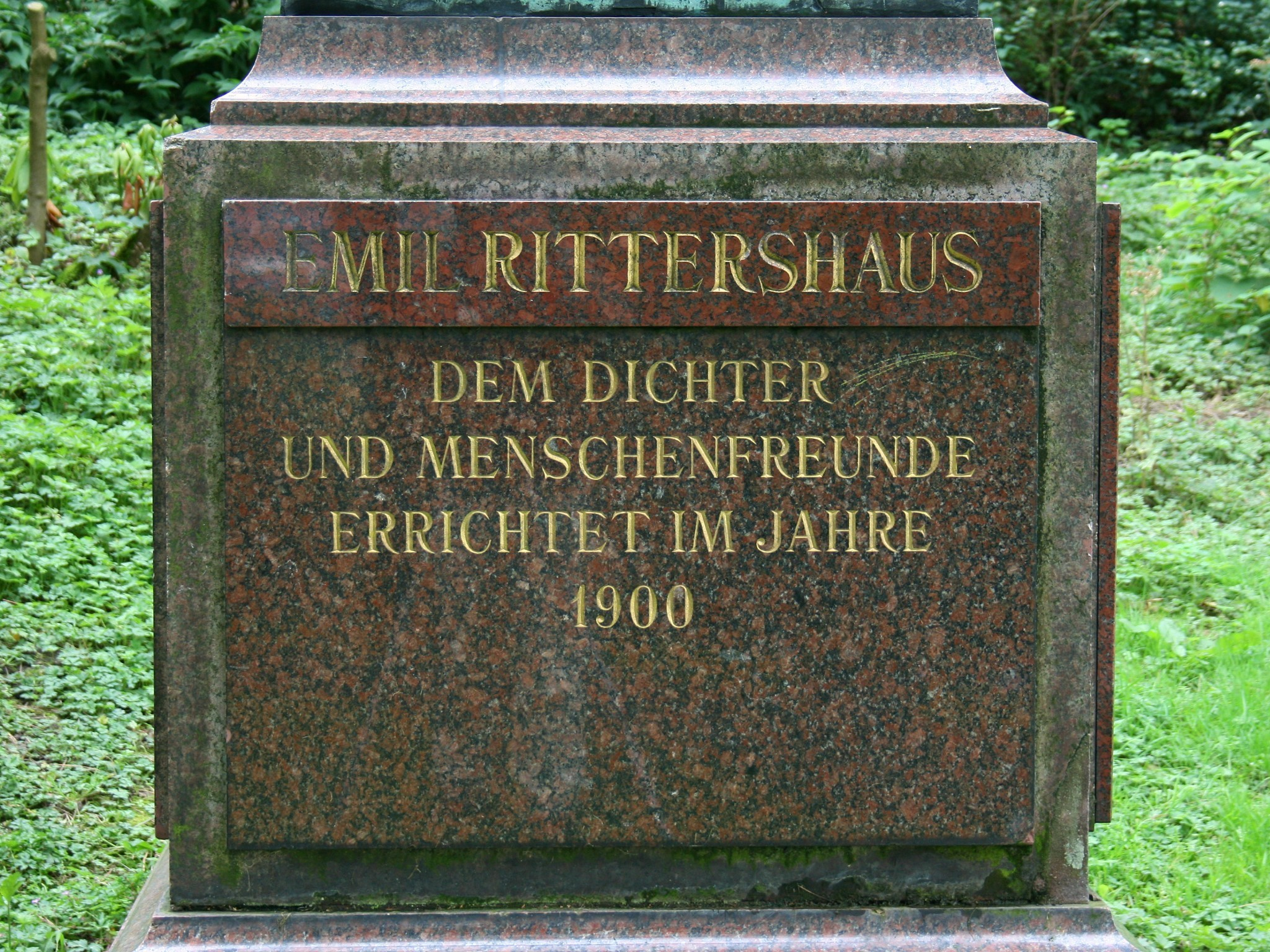
The statue's plaque, it reads "To the poet and philanthropist, established in 1900"

== Selected works ==
- — (1880) [First ed. 1855]. Gedichte [Poems] (6th ed.). Breslau: Eduard Trewendt. OCLC 608819518.
- Westfalenlied (Westphalia Anthem; 1886)
- — (1890) [First ed. c. 1886]. Buch der Leidenschaft [Book of Passion] (in German) (3rd ed.). OCLC 68063153.
- — (1893) [First ed. 1893]. In Bruderliebe und Brudertreue [In brotherly love and brotherly loyalty] (in German). Hesse. OCLC 1133304482.
- — (1893). Spruchperlen heitrer lebenskunst [Proverbs of cheerful life] (in German). Berlin: G. Grote. OCLC 798559250.
- — (1900) [First ed. 1884]. Am Rhein und beim Wein Gedichte (4th stereotype ed.). Bonn: Strauß. OCLC 1068827667.
