= Ernst Aufseeser =

German painter and illustrator (1880–1940)

Ernst Aufseeser (1880–1940) was a German painter, illustrator and graphic designer. His design work included trademarks, stamps, book covers, typography, posters and textiles.

== Career ==
Aufseeser was born in Nuremberg, Germany the son of a merchant and of Jewish ancestry. Intended for a commercial career himself, he completed an apprenticeship at the Nuremberg School of Commerce. Afterwards he volunteered at an export company in Nuremberg and then worked in England for some years. After deciding to embark on an artistic career, he attended the Stieglitz workshops between 1900 and 1903 in Berlin under the direction of the designer and typographer Fritz Helmuth Ehmcke, who later called Aufseeser to be his successor. In 1905 he moved to London where he attended the Slade School of Art for two years and by 1907 was working as an artist in Munich. He was a competitor in the art events of the 1928 Summer Olympics in Amsterdam. From 1914 he taught as a professor of commercial art at the Kunstakademie Düsseldorf, later succeeding Ehmcke as director of graphic design in 1919. In 1933 he was dismissed from his post as a result of the Nazi anti-Jewish laws. He died on 12 December 1940 in Düsseldorf. His son Hans Tisdall became a successful designer in England.

His style characterised by the use of typographic ornaments, usually in black-and-white. His works were reproduced frequently in Das Zelt, journal of the Ehmcke-Kreises. Examples of his design work are held in the Victoria and Albert Museum and the Los Angeles County Museum of Art.

== Gallery ==
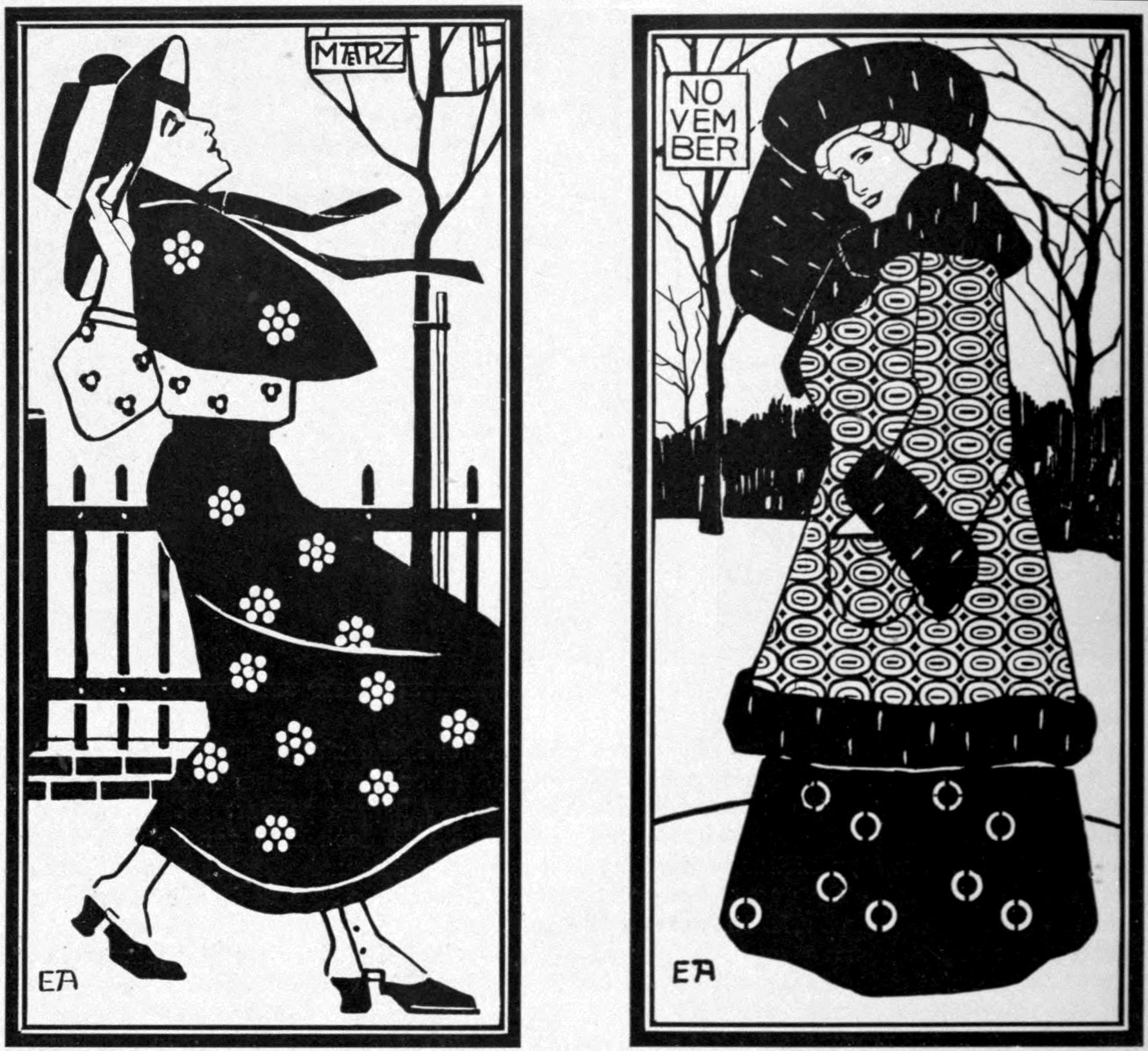
Two Calendar Images: Marz / November

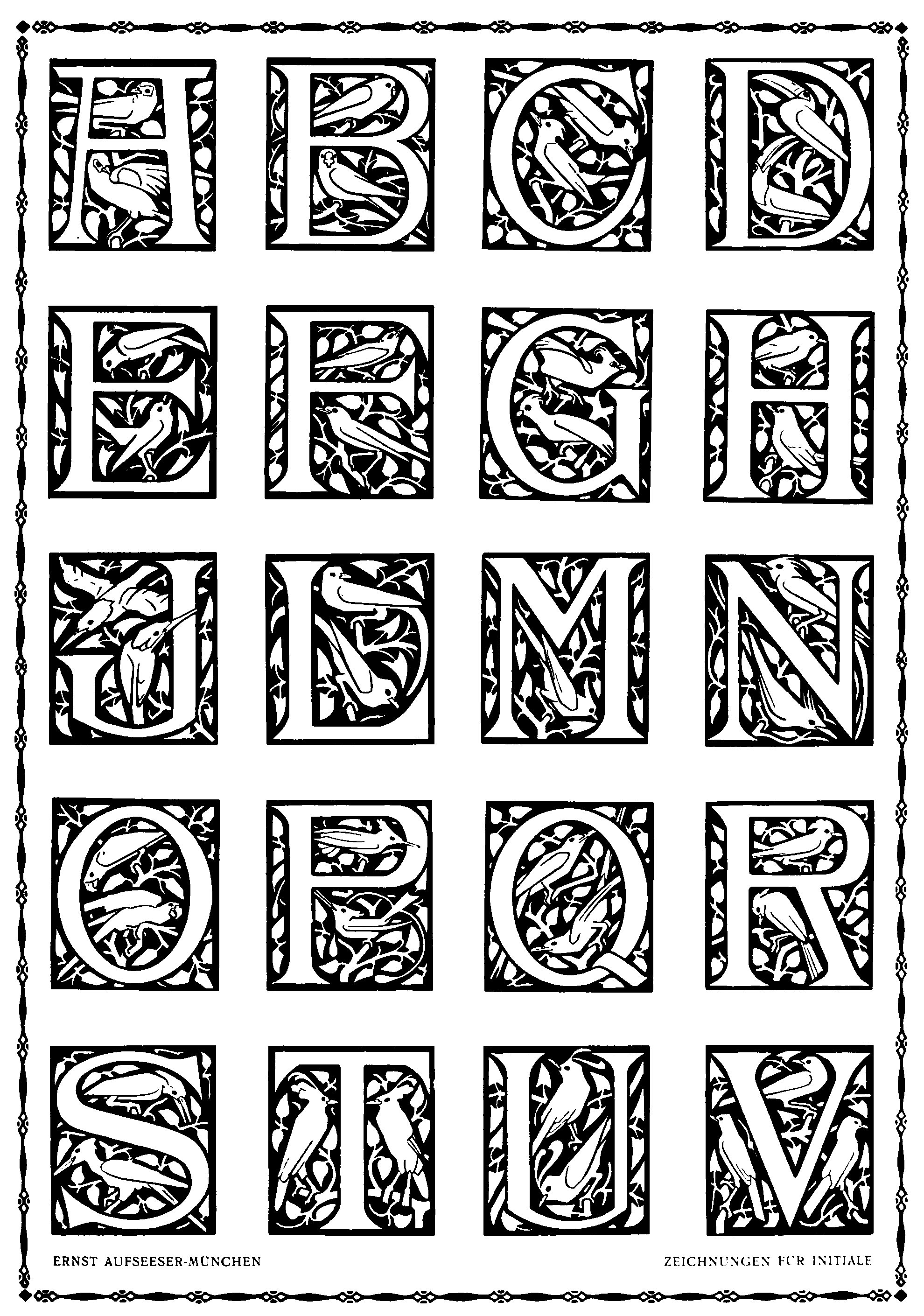
Alphabet

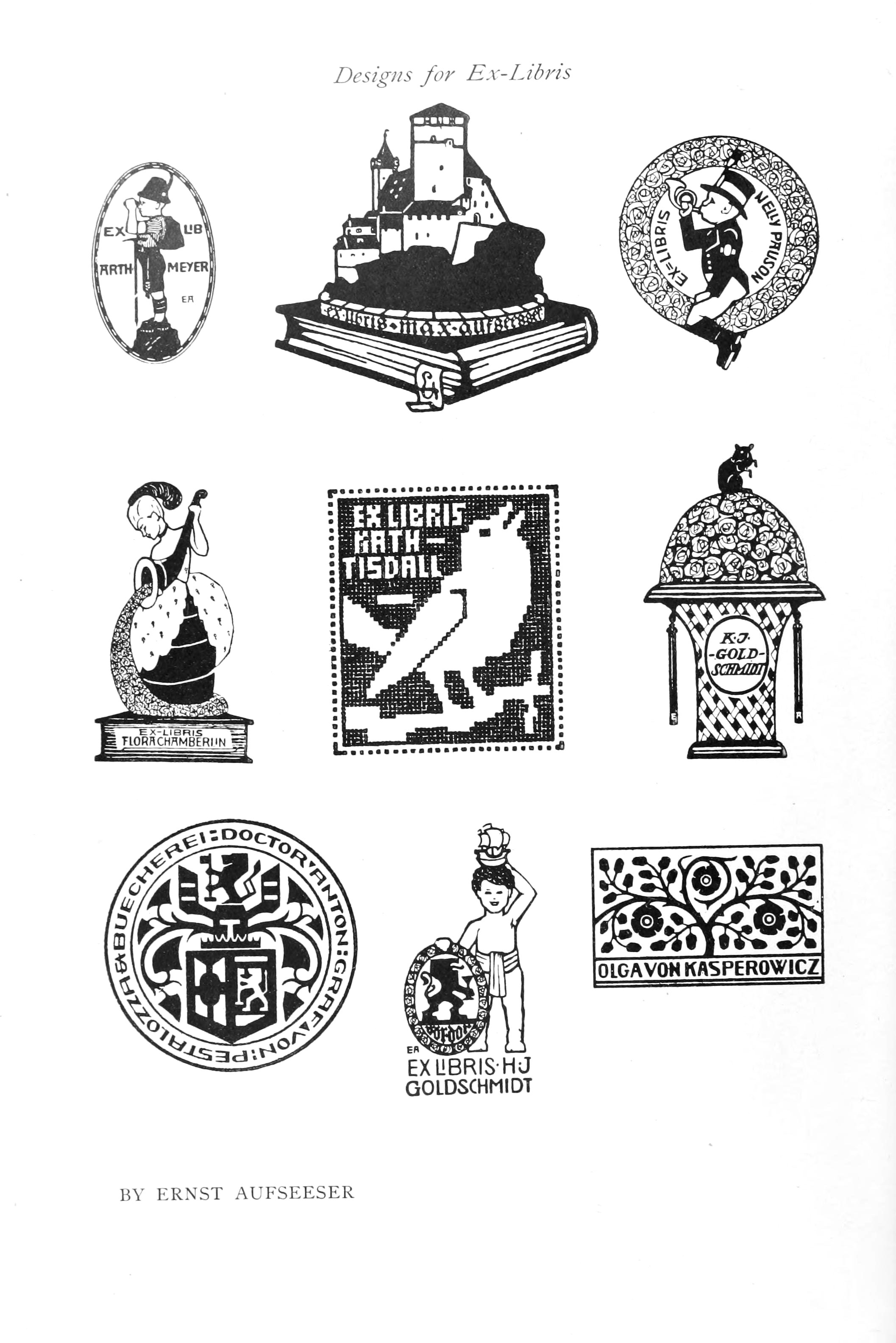
Designs for Ex Libris

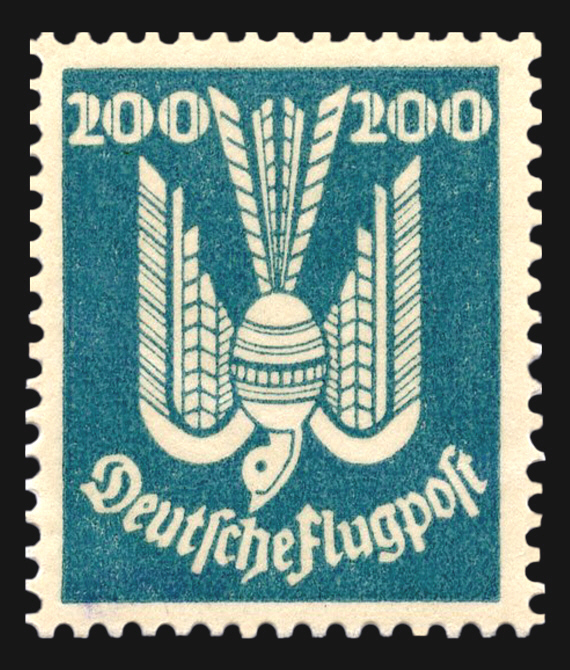
Airmail Stamp Series “Wooden Dove”, 1924

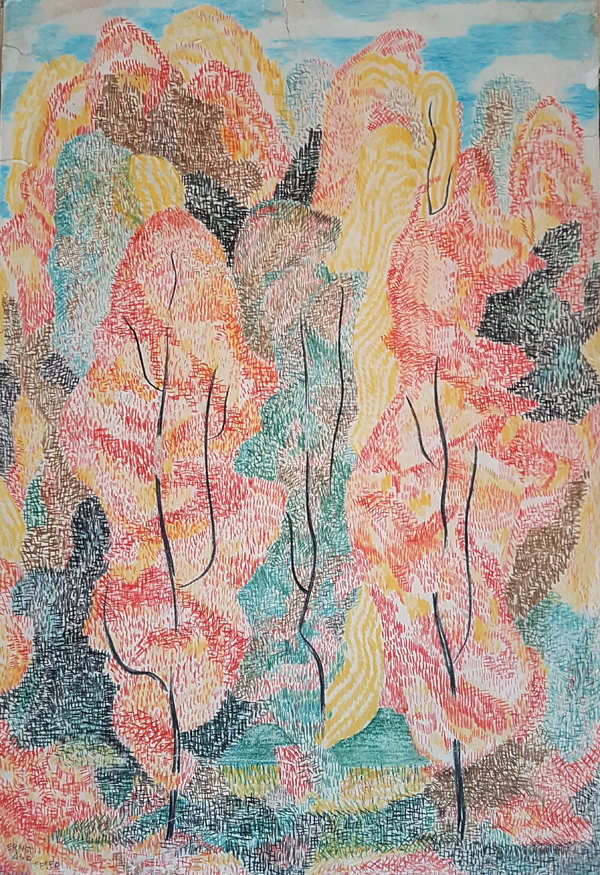
Trees, coloured pencil and pastel on paper, c.1905

== Exhibitions ==
- Deutscher Werkbund, Cologne, 1914
- Wilhelm-Lehmbruck-Museums, Duisburg, 1983
- Kunstverein, Hannover, 1983
- Kunsthalle, Wilhelmshaven, 1983
- Düsseldorf, 1985 (group).

== Bibliography ==
- Deutsche Biographische Enzyklopädie, Munich, London, New Providence: K.G. Saur 1995– (from 1997: Munich only), 1995.
- ‘Flor-Stickereien von Ernst Aufseeser’, Die Kunst, 1/1910, p. 50–56
- Rudolf Bleistein, ‘Neue deutsche Buchillustration’, Das Plakat, March 1915 (supplement, pp. 1, 2)
- F. H. Ehmcke, ‘Wahrzeichen – Warenzeichen’ (trademarks), Das Plakat, Feb. 1921, pp. 69–100
- Der Querschnitt, 1921, p. 180 (museum poster)
- F. H. Ehmcke, ‘Deutsche Gebrauchsgraphik’, Klimschs Jahrbuch, 1927, pp. 9–37
- H. K. Frenzel, ‘Advertising in Germany in 1930’, Modern Publicity, 1930, pp. 102–9, 122
- Kunstsammlungen der Stadt Düsseldorf – 1945–8, Düsseldorf, 1948
- Barbara Lepper, ed., Verboten, verfolgt. Kunstdiktatur im 3. Reich (exh. cat.), Duisburg, 1983
- Ulrich Krempel (ed.), Am Anfang: Das junge Rheinland (exh. cat.), Düsseldorf: Claasen, 1985
- Walter F. Schubert, Die deutsche Werbegraphik, Berlin: Francke & Lang, 1927, p. 214 (cover of Der Querschnitt)
- Hans Bockwitz, ‘Typographie und Gebrauchsgraphik in der Düsseldorfer Kunstakademie’, Archiv für Buchgewerbe und Gebrauchsgraphik, Leipzig: Deutsche Buchgewerbeverein., Aug. 1932, pp. 334–44, 345
- H. K. Frenzel, ‘Professor Ernst Aufseeser’, Gebrauchsgraphik (International Advertising Art), Berlin: Phönix Illustrationsdruck und Verlag GmbH (later: ‘Gebrauchsgraphik’ Druck und Verlag GmbH), 1933–71. Published from Munich from 1950., Dec. 1932, pp. 12–26
- Rudolf Schmitt, ‘Illustrierte Bücher und Mappenwerke des Jungen Rheinland’, Imprimatur, Band XII, 1987, pp. 146–64
- Allgemeines Künstlerlexikon, Munich/Leipzig: K.G. Saur Verlag, 1990–., 1992
- Max Osborn, ‘Die neuen deutschen Briefmarken’ (new stamps), Gebrauchsgraphik (International Advertising Art), Berlin: Phönix Illustrationsdruck und Verlag GmbH (later: ‘Gebrauchsgraphik’ Druck und Verlag GmbH), 1933–71. Published from Munich from 1950., 1925, v. 2, pp. 16–22
- ‘Arbeiten von Mitgliedern der Gruppe Düsseldorf’, Gebrauchsgraphik (International Advertising Art), Berlin: Phönix Illustrationsdruck und Verlag GmbH (later: ‘Gebrauchsgraphik’ Druck und Verlag GmbH), 1933–71. Published from Munich from 1950., Feb. 1931, pp. 64–8, esp. p. 64
