= Hermann Kletke =

19th-century German writer

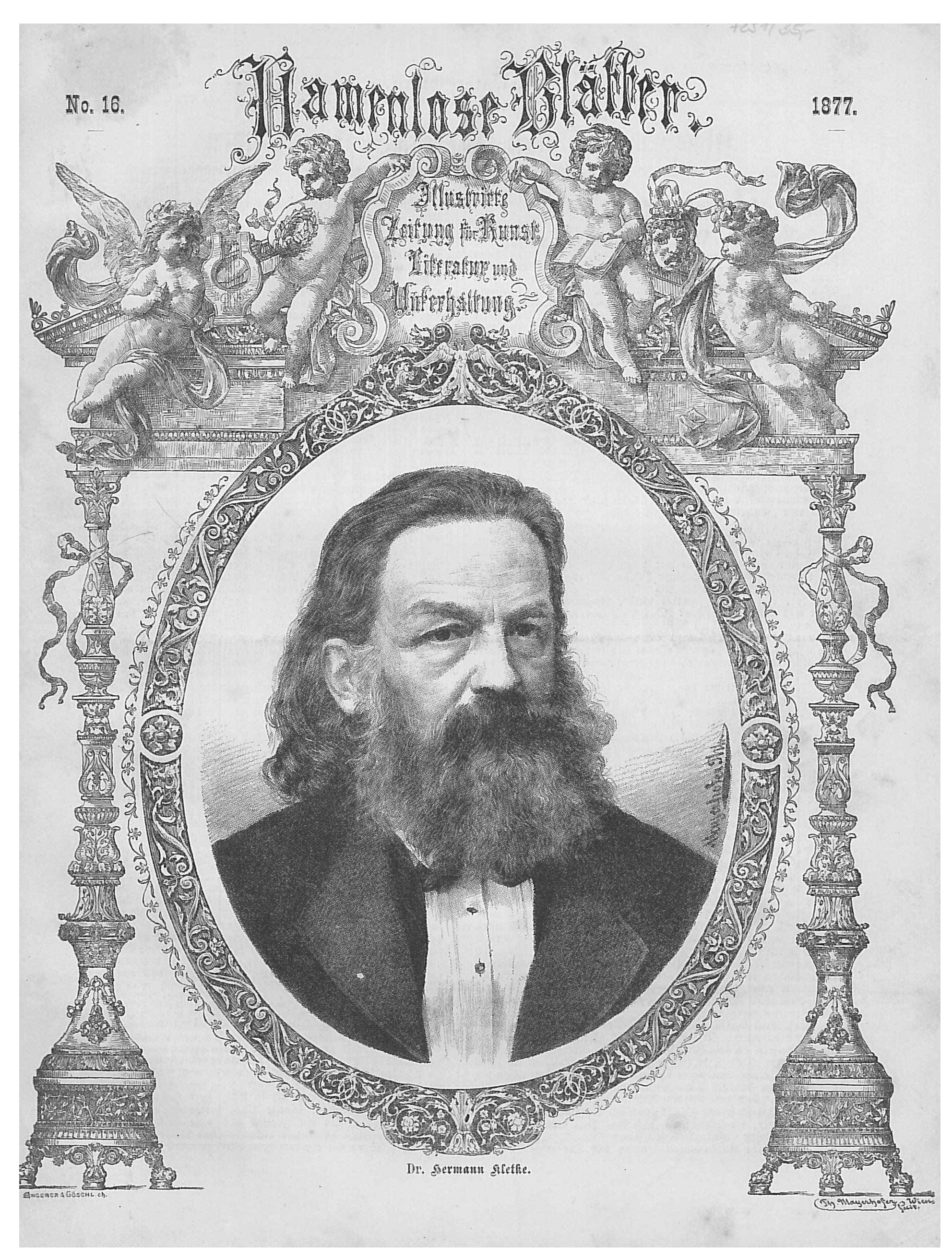
- Kletke pictured on the title page of a 1877 edition of Namenlose Blätter
- Born: 14 March 1813; Breslau, Prussia
- Died: 2 May 1886 (aged 73); Berlin, German Empire
- Occupation: Poet
- Writing career
- Subject: Children's poetry

Hermann Kletke (14 March 1813 – 2 May 1886) was a German poet, novelist, and journalist.

Kletke is primarily a children's writer; his songs are full of warm feeling, heartfelt simplicity and naive humor, including Kinderlieder and Die Kinderwelt. His fairy tales for youth are poetic and instructive, for example Almanach deutscher Volksmärchen.

== Career ==
Kletke was born in Breslau, Prussia (now Wrocław, Poland), on 13 March 1803. His experience with writing poetry and children's tales began during his schooling, although he would go onto graduate with a doctorate in philosophy from the University of Breslau.

In 1832, Kletke was registered as a part of the Corps Borussia Breslau, an educational fraternity with members such as the German playwright Arthur Müller, philologist Ernest Wahner, and ancient historian Walter Otto. In 1836 while in Breslau, Kletke's poetry was published for the first time, his collection Gedichte. However, because of ruler Klemens von Metternich's restrictive censorship on published literature, one year later he decided to move to Berlin.

Later he travelled to Vienna and then Berlin where he began working for the Vossische Zeitung. He remained at the paper until his death, succeeded as editor-in-chief by Friedrich Stephany.

Kletke died in Berlin on 2 May 1886, at age 73.

== Works ==
Kletke is primarily a children's writer; his songs are full of warm feeling, heartfelt simplicity and naive humor, including Kinderlieder and Die Kinderwelt. His fairy tales for youth are poetic and instructive.

His poem "Der Sandmann" was set to music by Robert Schumann as No. 12 of his Liederalbum für die Jugend (song collection for youth), Op. 79, published in 1849.

=== Poetry collections ===
- 1837: Words of love and comfort
- 1852: Gedichte
- 1857: Lied und Spruch. Neue Gedichte

=== Fairy-tale collections ===
- Almanach deutscher Volksmärchen
- Märchensaal aller Völker
- Deutsche Kindermärchen, in Reime gebracht
- Märchen meiner Grossmutter
- Ein Märchenbuch
- Märchen am Kamin (1871)
- Weihnachten.
