= E. A. Seemann =

German publisher

Coordinates: 51.334567°N 12.392321°E

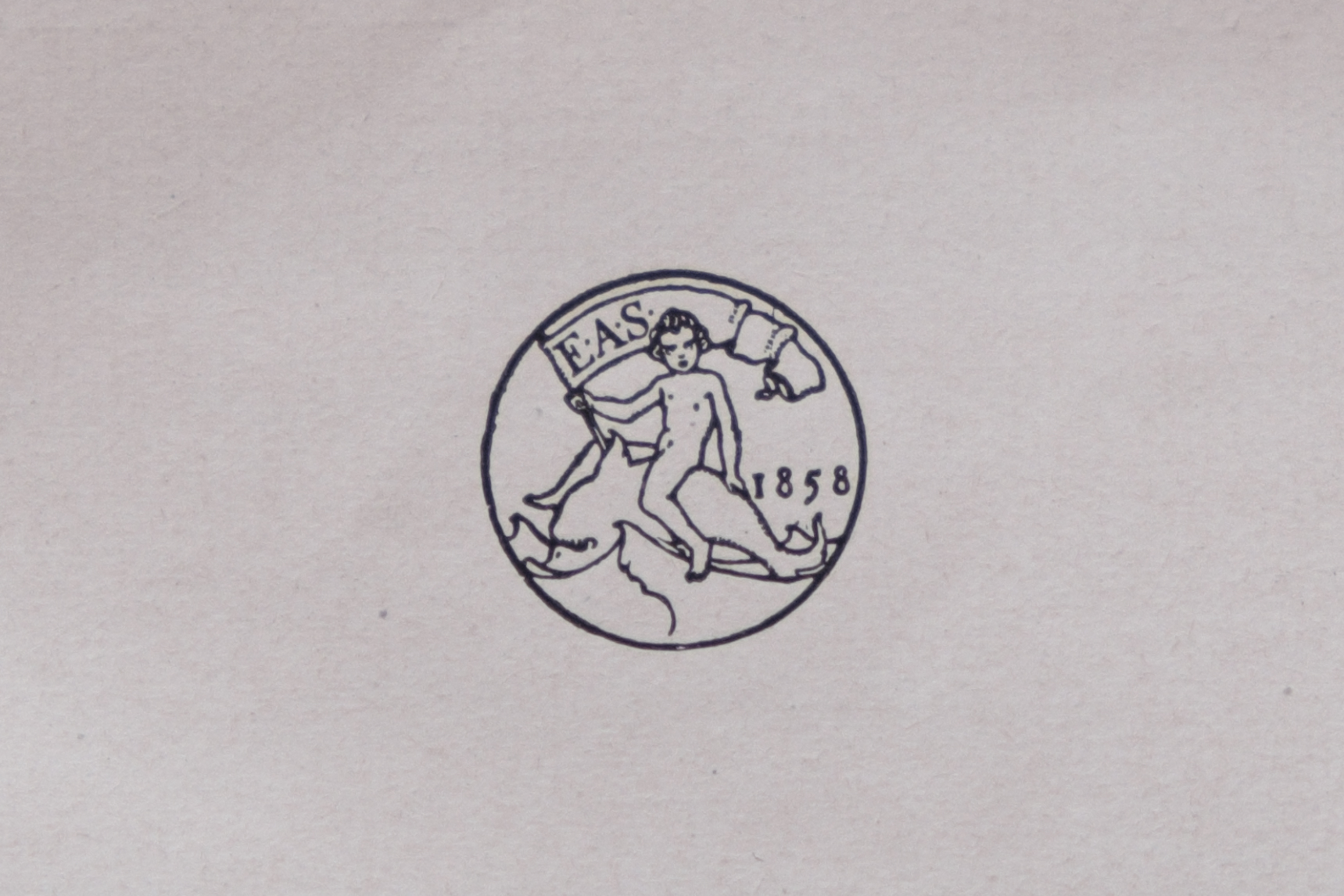
1927 logo

The E. A. Seemann Verlag (now operating as the Seemann Henschel GmbH & Co. KG) is a German publisher, founded on 1 December 1858, based in Leipzig and specialising in art and art history.

== History ==
=== Ernst ===
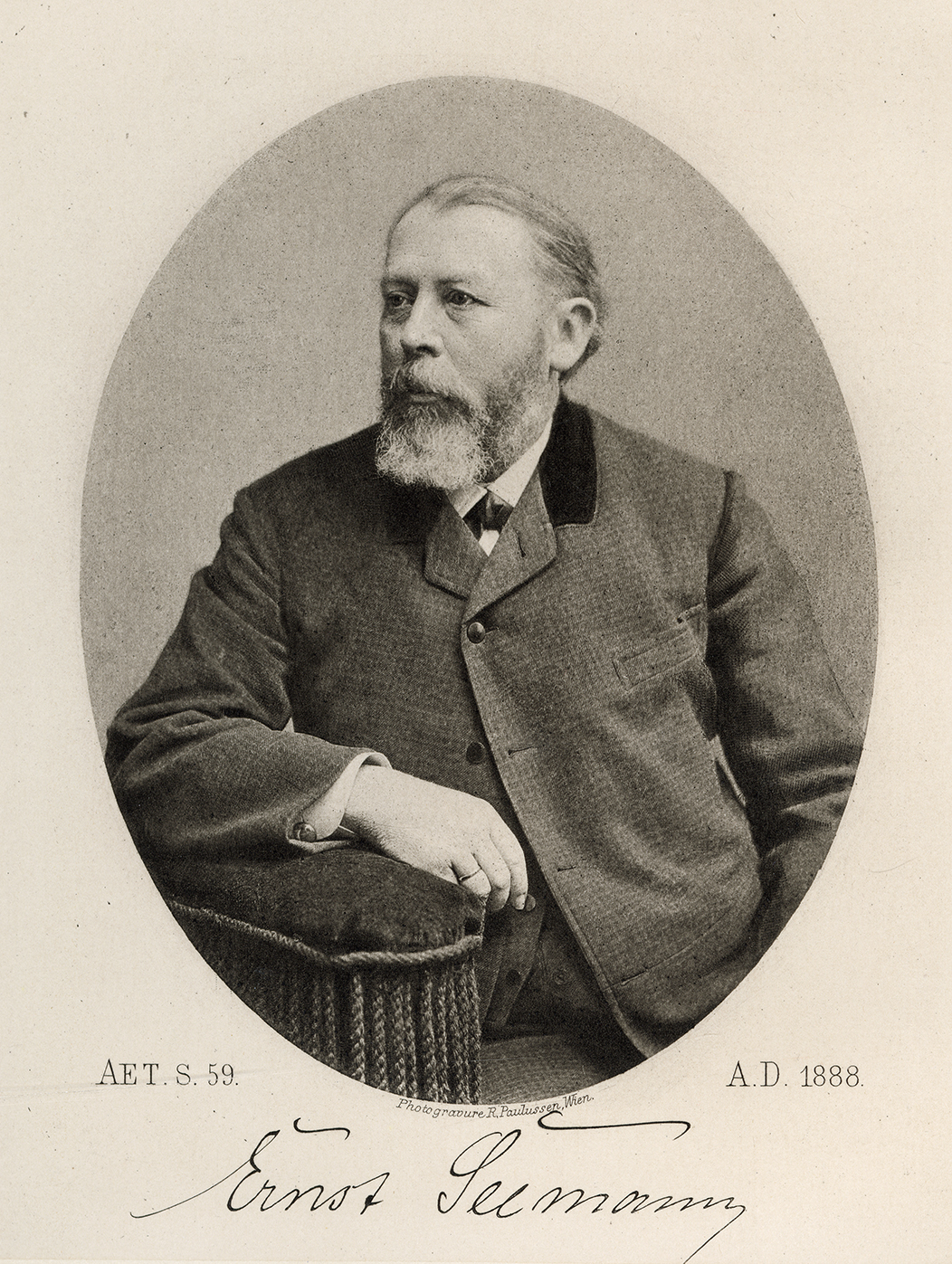
Ernst Arthur Seemann, 1888

On 1 December 1858 the 29-year-old Ernst Arthur Seemann announced the opening of a business entitled E. A. Seemann, Verlags- und Sortimentsbuchhandlung, verbunden mit Kunst-, Musikalien u. Antiquariatsbuchhandel (Publisher's Bookshop and Assorted Bookshop, connected with the art, musical and antiquarian book trade) in Essen, the first German publisher to focus on painting reproductions and art writing. On 15 August 1861 he moved it to Leipzig, where the company name soon became a byword for high-quality writing on art. For example, it published Wilhelm Lübke's "History of Architecture" (1858) and his "History of Sculpture in all Times and Lands" (1863), Robert Dohme's six-volume biographical dictionary "Art and Artists of the Middle Ages and the Modern Era" (1875–1880) and the series Seemanns Beiträge zur Kunstgeschichte (Seemann's Contribution to Art History, 1878 onwards), dedicated to specific artists, artworks, eras or regions.

From 1866 it began publishing Germany's first art magazine, entitled Zeitschrift für bildende Kunst (Magazine for Fine Arts), which remained a specialist journal for the art world for sixty-six years. In 1867 it began publishing the Jahrbuch für Kunstwissenschaft (Art Yearbook) and the following year took over the rights to Jacob Burckhardt's work. From 1877 it used printing blocks for woodcut illustrations.

=== Artur to Elert ===
Ernst finally handed the company over to his son Artur on 1 January 1899. Ernst was its sole leader from then until 1 October 1899, when he split management with Gustav Kirstein (1870–1934) and largely withdrew into private life. He handed his share over to his eldest son Elert A. Seemann (1892–1989) in 1923 and killed himself two years later aged sixty-four.

The publishing house had changed location in Leipzig several times before moving into the newly constructed building on Hospitalstrasse (now Prager Strasse) in the Graphisches Viertel in the east of the city on 1 April 1912. Kirstein modernised the E. A. Seemann publishing house and consolidated the company's reputation as one of the leading art publishers in Germany. He produced E. A. Seemanns farbige Gemäldewiedergaben (E. A. Seemann's coloured painting reproductions), showing classical and modern masterpieces, which had been made possible by the newly invented three-colour printing in the large printing house Förster & Borries (Zwickau/Sa.). On its fiftieth anniversary, the publishing house was able to present around 950 colour images in a total production of 150 million art copies. This made it the largest publishing company of its kind in the world. In addition to the individual sheets, each priced at one Mark, it also put together portfolios dedicated to selected artists, each with a short introductory text.

From 1900 onwards, the publisher also printed large-scale colour reproductions, which were used primarily as wall decorations and teaching materials. The series Moderne Graphik published original etchings on high-quality artist paper, usually signed by the artists. In 1933, this collection comprised around 400 works, including ones by Max Beckmann, Lovis Corinth, Käthe Kollwitz, Max Liebermann, Edvard Munch, Emil Nolde and Max Klinger. In 1922, Kirstein republished the 1842 History of Frederick the Great by the art historian Franz Kugler with 400 illustrations by Adolph Menzel, for which he acquired Menzel's old woodblocks. Some of the company's larger publications have remained fundamental to art-historical research to this day, including Wilhelm Waetzoldt's German Art Historians (1921/1924), Gustav Kirstein's monograph The Life of Adolph Menzel (1919), Max Deri's Introduction to Contemporary Art (1919, 3rd edition 1922) and Hans Wolfgang Singer's Modern Graphic Art (1914, 3rd edition 1922).

In 1923, the Library of Art History was launched, with a total of 500 volumes, of which only 88 issues in 84 volumes were actually published. Well-known art historians, mostly from Germany but also from abroad, contributed essays to it on works of art (Erwin Panofsky: The Sistine Ceiling), artists (Gustav Pauli: Leonardo da Vinci), periods (Camillo Praschniker: Cretan Art) or overarching themes in art history (Kurt Gerstenberg: Ideas for an Art Geography of Europe). The volumes in octavo format of the series dedicated to fine art, which began with Heinrich Wölfflin's The Explanation of Works of Art and ended with Hans Tietze's Contemporary French Painting, were divided into a text and a photo section and, with the exception of the two double volumes and the triple volume, did not exceed two printed sheets.

With the eight-volume edition of Masterpieces. An Art History for the German People (1927 to 1934) by the Leipzig professor of art history Leo Bruhns, the publisher presented an inexpensive and generally understandable reference work.

From 1911, the company took over publication of the General Encyclopedia of Fine Artists from Antiquity to the Present (which had previously been taken over by the Leipzig publisher Wilhelm Engelmann), nicknamed the "Thieme-Becker" after its two editors Ulrich Thieme and Felix Becker). In 1923 Hans Vollmer took over as its editor and it was completed in 1947 with the last alphabetical volume and in 1950 with a volume on anonymous artists and monogrammists.

In 1911, the Seemann-Lichtbildanstalt was established as a branch company that produced the Seestern-Lichtbilder, slides for teaching and educational purposes.

=== Under Nazism ===
Elert joined the Nazi Party early on and in 1933 separated from Kirstein due to his being Jewish, leaving him with the art publishing house and image production, separate from the Verlag E. A. Seemann. He soon also forced Kirstein's operation to rename itself "Meister der Farbe" (Master of Colours), though the Reich Chamber for Art (Reichskunstkammer) did give it a special permit to stay in business until 1938. On Kirstein's death on 14 February 1934 his widow Cläre took over management of his company but in 1938 Elert exerted his agreed right to repurchase it, though due to a dispute with the Reich Propaganda Ministry this only became legally binding in 1942 - in the meantime, in 1939, Cläre had killed herself.

The company was now solely a book publisher and abandoned colour printing, abandoning its long-held art historical focus to publish Nazi propaganda such as Wilhelm Pinder's On the Nature and Development of German Forms as well as Hans Weigert's Art of Today as a Mirror of the Times and Paul Schultze-Naumburg's Art from Blood and Soil. The 4 December 1943 bombing raid on Leipzig destroyed the publishing house, its photographic studio, all its documents and its printing equipment, with only the colour printing plates being stored at Förster & Borries in Zwickau and other materials and works then outside the main building surviving. This particularly impacted the editorial staff of the "Thieme-Becker" artists' encyclopedia with its extensive library and fifty year old collection of documents - the already completed typesetting of its last volume was destroyed.

=== Soviet Zone and DDR ===
Elert had signed over all parts of the company to his sister Irmgard Nußbaum-Seemann (1903–?) in September 1945 before fleeing to what would become West Germany and the occupying powers confirmed her as its owner on 13 February 1946. Kirstein's former half of the company, now renamed "Seemann and Co", was licensed to resume production at the war's end. On 3 December 1946 permission was granted for the company to publish the 'Zeitschrift für Kunst und künstlerische Gestaltung'.

In 1947 the occupiers licensed the company to publish "literature on art, art history, cultural history and intellectual history" but banned Elert from owning it due to his Nazi links, though he did establish a branch of the business in Cologne in the British Occupation Zone and ran it with great difficulties until his death in 1989, partly in collaboration with the main company's headquarters in Leipzig. Irmgard planned to move the company headquarters to Munich (i.e. out of the Soviet Occupation Zone) and moved the surviving "Thieme-Becker" documents and colour printing plates to her "Nautilus" branch in Bavaria, founded in 1949. When this became known she had to flee the German Democratic Republic in February 1952. Verlag E. A. Seemann was seized and on 8 August the same year became state owned as the VEB E. A. Seemann, retaining its founder's name after long disputes with Elert.

The publication of the Zeitschrift für Kunst marked a new beginning and book production continued. The company was also able to re-set, print and deliver the last volume of "Thieme-Becker" in 1947 thanks to a rescued proof. New monographs and art books as well as calendars were included in the program alongside reprints. In 1951, the E. A. Seemann Verlag was assigned the house at Jacobstrasse 6 in Leipzig as its new publishing house. Alongside the Verlag der Kunst in Dresden and the Henschelverlag Kunst und Gesellschaft, the E. A. Seemann Verlag handled the majority of art book production in the GDR. It was initially managed by Otto Halle, then from 1954 by Gerhard Keil (1922–1997). He built E. A. Seemann into the leading art publisher in the GDR.

After the completion of the "Thieme-Becker", which no longer listed artists born after 1870, it became necessary to supplement and update the work. Hans Vollmer took on this task. Within eight years he produced six further volumes, which were published between 1953 and 1962 under the title General Encyclopedia of Visual Artists of the 20th Century. The "Thieme-Becker-Vollmer" is still being reprinted unchanged to this day. At the end of the 1960s, work began on a new edition, the General Artist Encyclopedia of Visual Artists of All Times and Peoples (AKL), which was initially planned to consist of 30 volumes. Due to the inadequate technical equipment and the limited use of libraries outside the GDR, the publication of the first volume took until 1983; Volumes 2 and 3 followed every three years. Since 1 April 1991, the work has been continued by K. G. Saur Verlag. 99 volumes of the AKL have now been published, with the three volumes still published by E. A. Seemann Verlag being reprinted in four volumes for reasons of standardization.

One of the publisher's major art encyclopedias was the Lexikon der Kunst (Lexicon of Art) founded by Gerhard Strauß, which appeared in five volumes between 1968 and 1978. The first volume of a new edition of the encyclopedia, under the responsibility of Harald Olbrich as chief editor, was published in 1987, the seventh and final volume appeared in 1994.

In the 1970s, E. A. Seemann Verlag began a new major project, the Geschichte der deutschen Kunst (History of German Art). The first volume of the work, which was written by art historians from several universities and the Academy of Sciences of the GDR, was published in 1981. Under the leadership of Friedrich Möbius (Jena), Ernst Ullmann (Leipzig), Harald Olbrich (Berlin), Peter H. Feist (Berlin) and others, ten extensive volumes were published by 1990, covering individual art periods from the Middle Ages to the present. The volumes also reflect the methodological diversity of art historical research in the second half of the 20th century. Due to the onset of the economic crisis, the project had to be abandoned in 1990.

In addition to Seemann's large art calendar (Seemanns großem Kunstkalender), there was the monthly calendar The beautiful detail (Das schöne Detail) and three differently oriented postcard calendars from the end of the 1960s. An important part of the publishing program continued to be painting reproductions, which were published by, among others, Seemann and Feist. were sold in a collection of pictures for wall decoration.

=== 1990–present ===
After 1989, the publishing house was administered by a trustee for a while until Silvius Dornier acquired the publishing house and incorporated it into the newly founded Dornier Medienholding based in Berlin in the summer of 1992. The publishing house's editorial department and production remained in Leipzig. The name E. A. Seemann was also retained. Series such as the Kunstgeschichtliche Städtebücher, the Beiträge zur Kunstwissenschaft, the Baudenkmale issues and also the Leipziger Blätter, which has been published since the mid-1980s, grew with new editions. However, most of these series were discontinued in the 1990s. The complete range of calendars also appeared for the last time in 1992.

In addition to the Lexicon of Art, one-volume reference works were published, Seemann's Small Art Encyclopedia (1994) and Seemann's Encyclopedia of Architecture (1994). Classics of art practice were republished in the Art and Design series, including Max Doerner's Painting Materials and Their Use from 1921, John Gage's study of the Language of Colors and authors such as Johannes Itten and Gottfried Bammes.

The Dornier Media Holding separated from the art and culture publishers it had taken over in 1992, which included E. A. Seemann, the publishers Edition Leipzig and Henschel. On 1 April 2003, the partners Bernd Kolf and Jürgen A. Bach acquired the three publishing houses and re-established them as Seemann Henschel GmbH & Co. KG, which was joined in summer 2004 by the traditional Leipzig publishing house Koehler & Amelang. The company's headquarters are in Leipzig.

The world's most comprehensive artist encyclopedia, the "Thieme-Becker-Vollmer" (as a CD-ROM), completed in 1960, and the seven-volume "Encyclopedia of Art" are still in print, and study editions of both works have also been published. Other one-volume encyclopedias on various topics in the visual arts are also in the program, such as the "Encyclopedia of Symbols" (2003), the "Encyclopedia of Ornaments" (2004), Stefan Dürre's "Encyclopedia of Sculpture" (2007) and Brigitte Riese's "Encyclopedia of Iconography" (2007). Monographs are now being published in a series of paperback volumes on individual masterpieces of art history. With contributions by Barbara John on Max Klinger - Beethoven (2004) and Caspar David Friedrich - Chalk Cliffs on Rügen (2005) and by Roland Krischel on Stefan Lochner - The Mother of God in the Rose Bower (2006), it has also revived an old publishing tradition.

After the Seemann Henschel publishing group filed for insolvency on 1 March 2017, it was taken over by Michael Kölmel, the owner of Zweitausendeins, on 1 October 2017. Annika Bach has been managing director and publisher since 2017.

The publisher's archive material from the years 1864 to 1995 is now in the Leipzig State Archives.

== Bibliography (in German) ==
- Hundert Jahre im Dienste der Kunst! Tradition, festliche Besinnung und Perspektive des VEB E. A. Seemann in Leipzig. In: Börsenblatt für den deutschen Buchhandel (Leipzig) 125, 1958, S. 806–808.
- Alfred Langer: Kunstliteratur und Reproduktion. 125 Jahre Seemann-Verlag im Dienste der Erforschung und Verbreitung der Kunst. E. A. Seemann, Leipzig 1983.
- Reinhard Würffel: Lexikon deutscher Verlage von A–Z. 1071 Verlage und 2800 Verlagssignete; vom Anfang der Buchdruckerkunst bis 1945. Adressen, Daten, Fakten, Namen. Verlag Grotesk, Berlin 2000, ISBN 3-9803147-1-5, S. 800–803.
- P. Neumann: Seemann, E. A. In: Lexikon des gesamten Buchwesens. 2. Auflage, Band 7, Stuttgart 2007, S. 44.
- "Ute Willer, Susanne Müller-Wolff, 150 Jahre E. A. Seemann. Die Geschichte des ältesten deutschen Kunstverlages. 1858–2008 (E. A. Seemann: Leipzig, 2008)" (PDF).
- Ulrich Faure: 150 Jahre E. A. Seemann. In: Aus dem Antiquariat 2008, Nr. 1, S. 28–30.
- Ralph Gambihler: Im Land der Schachtelhalme. Der Seemann Verlag und seine Geschichte ab 1945. In: Leipziger Blätter 2008, Nr. 52, S. 38–40.
- Christoph Links: Das Schicksal der DDR-Verlage. Die Privatisierung und ihre Konsequenzen. Ch. Links Verlag, Berlin 2009, ISBN 978-3-86153-523-2, S. 160–163.
- Lothar Poethe (2010). "Seemann, Ernst Arthur". Neue Deutsche Biographie (in German). Vol. 24. Berlin: Duncker & Humblot. pp. 153–154. (full text online).
- Lothar Poethe (2010). "Seemann, Arthur". Neue Deutsche Biographie (in German). Vol. 24. Berlin: Duncker & Humblot. pp. 154–155. (full text online).
