= Wolfgang Müller von Königswinter =

German poet and novelist (1816–1873)

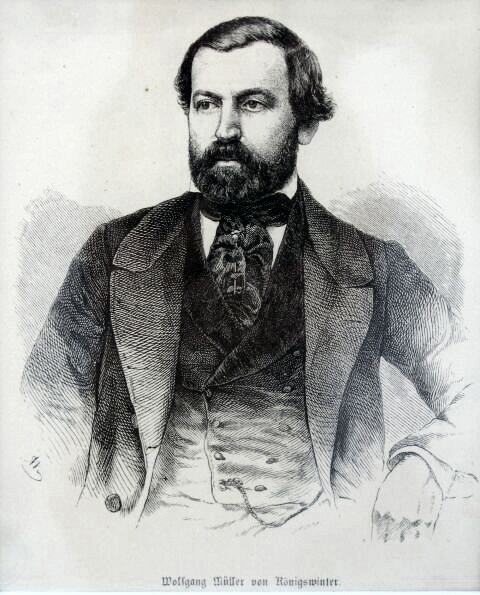
- Born: 15 March 1816; Königswinter, Germany
- Died: 29 June 1873 (aged 57); Bad Neuenahr-Ahrweiler, Germany
- Occupations: Novelist; chronicler
- Writing career
- Notable work: Merlin der Zauberer

Wolfgang Müller von Königswinter (15 March 1816 – 29 June 1873) was a German novelist and poet. He settled in Cologne, and became a popular poet, novelist, and chronicler of the Rhine region.

== Early life ==
Müller was born in Königswinter, Germany on 15 March 1816. His real name was also the name of an earlier poet, Wilhelm Müller. He also followed the poet's practice of appending the name of his birthplace to his original name. In 1835, he went to Bonn to study medicine at the wish of his father, also a physician. There he met Karl Joseph Simrock and Gottfried Kinkel. He continued his studies in Berlin in 1838 and graduated in 1840, after which he served his required time in the army as a surgeon. On his discharge in 1842, he went to Paris where he met Heinrich Heine, Georg Herwegh and Franz von Dingelstedt and continued his medical studies.

His stay in Paris was brief, since the death of his father pushed him to establish a practice in Düsseldorf. He married in 1847, and his family life was a great comfort and inspiration to him in later years. In 1848, he was a delegate to the preliminary parliament at Frankfurt. At its conclusion, he went back to writing sagas about the Rhine. In 1853, he gave up his medical practice and moved to Cologne, and gradually gave up medicine to devote himself to literature. He briefly went back to practicing medicine during the Franco-Prussian War and wrote some patriotic poems on this occasion.

== Poetry ==
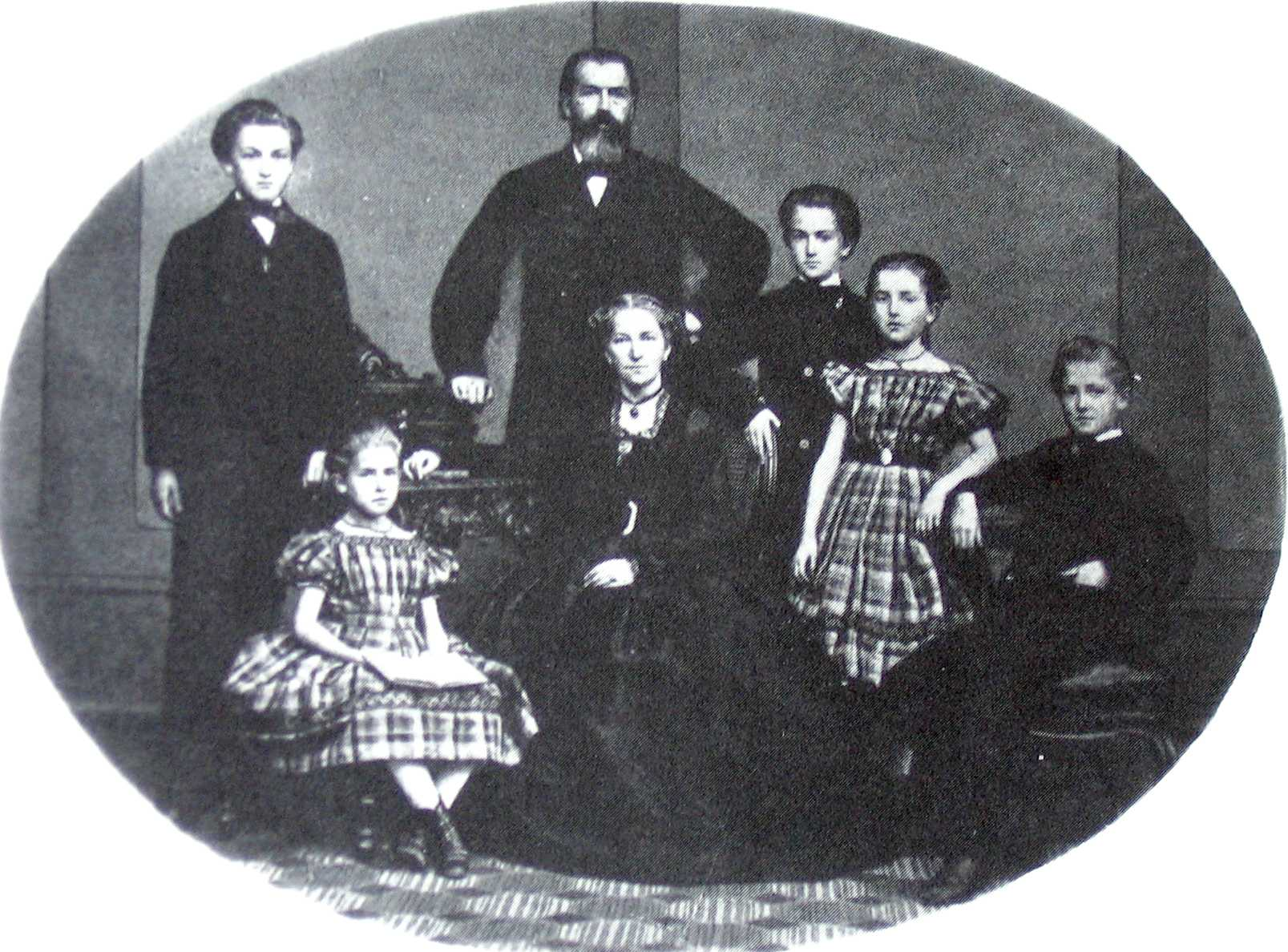
Müller and his family (1863)

He is well known for his poem Merlin der Zauberer ("Merlin the Magician," 1857). Verse epics or narratives in the German Arthurian Literature tradition were undertaken with various success from the mid-19th century forward. In contrast to Romantic poets like Karl Leberecht Immermann, for whom Merlin represented the spirit of nature, Müller created a "modern Merlin" who, as Niniane's lover, uses his wisdom to resolve the conflict created by his revelation of the love affair of Guinevere. The Merlin-Niniane relationship is presented as uncharacteristically positive compared to other depictions in the Arthurian cannon.

Another well-known poem of his is Mein Herz ist am Rhein ("My heart is by the Rhine"). Six volumes of his selected poems were published under the title Dichtungen eines rheinischen Poeten ("Poesies of a Rhine poet," 1871-76).

Müller's poetry finds much of its material in the Rhine, its beauty, its legends, and the life of its people. His verses were not imposing in their depth of passion, originality or flights of imagination, but won the reader through their free and fresh aura, their musical voice, their tender mellowness and their poetical sensuality. They were characterised by beauty and health.

Composer Sophie Seipt (1812–1889) used Muller's text for her song "Auf eines Berges Hohen" (1852).

== Works ==
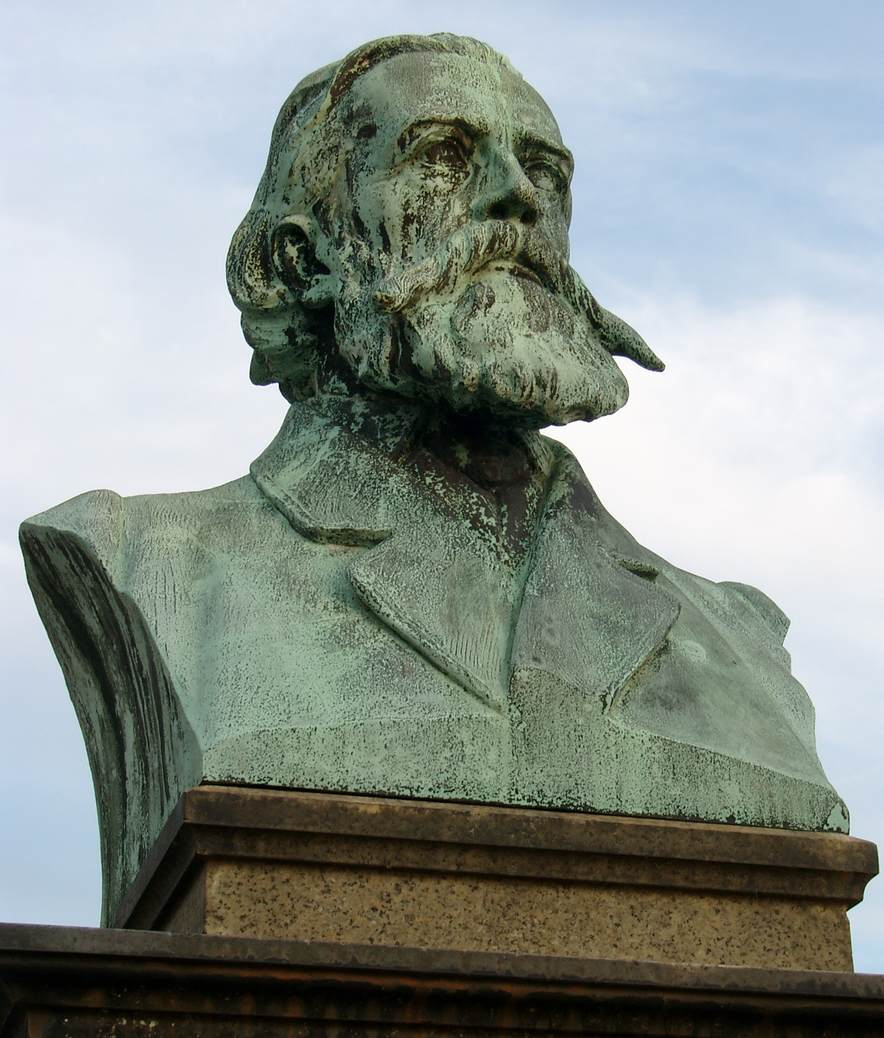
A bust of Müller by Otto Lessing, on the river Rhine in Königswinter (built 1895/1896)

Notable books of his include:

- — (1854). Düsseldorfer Künstler aus den letzten funfundzwanzig Jahren: kunstgeschichtliche Briefe [Düsseldorf Artists from the Last Twenty-Five Years: Art History Letters] (in German). Leipzig: Rudolf Weigel. OCLC 2088378.
- — (1856). Der Rattenfänger von Sankt Goar rheinische Kleinstädtergeschichte [The Rat-Catcher of Sankt Goar: A Rhineland Small-Town Story] (in German). Köln: M. DuMont Schauberg]. OCLC 246702958.
- — (1861). Erzählungen eines rheinischen Chronisten [Stories from a Rhenish Chronicler] (in German). Leipzig: Brockhaus. OCLC 794811445.
- — (1868) [1847]. Gedichte [Poems] (in German). Vol. 1 (3rd ed.). Hanover: Rümpler. OCLC 833390134.
  - — (1868) [1847]. Gedichte [Poems] (in German). Vol. 2 (3rd ed.). Hanover: Rümpler. OCLC 833390138.
- — (1871) [1857]. Mein Herz ist am Rheine: Liederbuch [My heart is on the Rhine: Songbook] (in German) (4th ed.). Köln: Brockhaus. OCLC 867506147.
- — (1873) [1851]. Lorelei. Rheinisches Sagenbuch [Lorelei. Rhenish Book of Legends] (in German) (4th ed.). Leipzig: Brockhaus. OCLC 993745159.
- — (1874). Im Rittersaal rheinische Historien [Rhenish Histories in the Knight's Hall] (in German). Leipzig: Brockhaus. OCLC 894093827.

== Sources ==
- Norris, J. Lacy, ed. (1986). "German Arthurian Literature (Modern)". The Arthurian Encyclopedia. New York: Garland Publishing.
- Franz Brümmer (1885). "Müller von Königswinter, Wolfgang" . Allgemeine Deutsche Biographie (in German). Vol. 22. Leipzig: Duncker & Humblot. pp. 698–701.

Attribution

- This publication in turn cites:
  - Joesten, Wolfgang Müller (Cologne, 1895)
