= Prince Whitebear =

19th century Danish dairytale

Prince Whitebear (Danish: Prinds Hvidbjørn; Prins Hvidbjørn) is a Danish fairy tale first published by Danish author Mathias Winther in 1823.

The tale is related to the international cycle of the Animal as Bridegroom or The Search for the Lost Husband: a human maiden marries an animal that is a prince in disguise, breaks a taboo and loses him, and she has to seek him out. Variants of the tale with the heroine's husband in the shape of a white bear were also collected from oral tradition by other Danish authors.

== Summary ==
A king with three daughters is visited by a white bear who roars in his garden. The king sends his daughters to shoo away the animal: the eldest princess takes a large piece of wood to expel the bear, who asks her to sit on his back. The elder refuses. The next day, the bear returns, and the monarch sends his middle daughter to banish the animal. The middle princess takes another piece of wood to frighten the bear, who asks her to sit on his back, but she refuses. Lastly, the bear returns again, and asks the youngest princess to climb on his back. The girl agrees and departs with bear to the forest. The bear stops by a cave and indicates that it will be their new home for the next years. He tells her he becomes a prince at night, and, if she does not light any lamp at night for the next seven years, he will be disenchanted.

They live like this for the next six years. One day, after two years, the bear prince says that the elder princess is getting married, and allows the girl to pay them a visit, provided that she promises to not let anyone convince her to light any light source when she returns. The bear takes her there and her sister tries to trick her into lighting any source, but she resists. Two years later, it is the middle sister's wedding, and the bear prince allows her to visit, with the same caveat not to be led into breaking the promise she made him. Again, the princess's sister tries to do it, but the princess resists. After two more years, the bear prince tells his wife that her father is celebrating his birthday, and allows the princess to attend the celebration, with the same warning. Back home, the princess's sister gives her a tinderbox and a candlestick, which she brings to the cave.

After she returns to the cave, the princess lights up the candlestick to better see her companion, and finds a handsome prince next to her. However, some candlewax drops on his body and he wakes up, saying they must depart. The princess asks for forgiveness, and he advises her to seek his three sisters, with his greetings. Thus, the princess wanders through mountains and forests, until she passes by the houses of the bear prince's sisters, where she gains a golden spindle from the first one, a golden reel from the second, and a golden spinning wheel from the third. Finally, she asks a blacksmith to fashion iron shoes for her to climb a glass mountain.

It happens thus, and the princess climbs with iron shoes tied to her hands and feet the glass mountains, and reaches a large castle. By the castle doors, the princess takes out the golden spindle and begins to spin, which draws the attention of a witch. The princess trades the spindle to spend a night sitting on the landing where Prince Whitebear sleeps. The witch gives some sleeping potion to the prince and he falls asleep. The princess tries to wake him up by singing some verses, to no avail. The next day, the princess takes out the golden reel and trades it for another night near Prince Whitebear's chambers. It happens thus, and the princess tries to wake him up by mentioning how they spend six years together and she climbed the glass mountain after him. Still, he does not nudge.

On the third day, a servant informs Prince Whitebear about a girl and the song she sings to his sleeping body, whom Prince Whitebear realizes it is his wife. As for the princess, she trades the last golden object, the spinning wheel, for a night near the prince's door. Prince Whitebear avoids drinking the sleeping potion and spends the night with his human wife. The next morning, the witch goes to check on the prince, when the princess bids the witch to watch the sunrise. By doing so the witch falls dead on the spot, since, as the story explains, she could not endure the sun. Thus, Prince Whitebear resumes his human form, and he lives with his wife in the troll-witch's castle.

== Analysis ==
=== Tale type ===
Norwegian scholar Jørgen Moe noted the resemblance between Winther's tale and the Norwegian tale East of the Sun and West of the Moon. The tale is classified in the international Aarne-Thompson-Uther Index as type ATU 425A, "The Animal as Bridegroom". in this tale type, the heroine is a human maiden who marries a prince that is cursed to become an animal of some sort. She betrays his trust and he disappears, prompting a quest for him.

=== Motifs ===
==== The heroine's journey ====
According to Hans-Jörg Uther, the main feature of tale type ATU 425A is "bribing the false bride for three nights with the husband". In fact, when he developed his revision of Aarne-Thompson's system, Uther remarked that an "essential" trait of the tale type ATU 425A was the "wife's quest and gifts" and "nights bought". In stories from Europe, mostly, the heroine's helpers may be three old crones, or her husband's relatives.

==== Other motifs ====
According to Jan-Öjvind Swahn's study on some 1,100 variants of Cupid and Psyche and related types, he concluded that the bear is the "most usual" form of the supernatural husband in Germanic and Slavonic areas.

In some tales, before the separation from her supernatural husband, the wife's children are taken from her and hidden elsewhere. Scholarship locates this motif across Celtic and Germanic speaking areas.

== Variants ==
=== Whitebear King's Son (Grundtvig) ===
Author Svend Grundtvig collected a variant from Vendsyssel, titled Hvidebjørn kongens søn or Hvidbjørn kongens søn ("Whitebear King's Son"): a king, father of four daughters, rides his horse through a meadow and begins to sink into the ground. A bear appears and offers his help, in exchange for the king's youngest daughter. Twice he refuses, but on the third time relents. The bear appears at court to get the girl, but the king tries to trick the bear by giving him servants' daughters. The bear eventually gets the princess and marries her. They live together and she gives birth to three children that the bear takes from her and hides elsewhere. The princess visits her family on the occasion on her sisters' weddings. After the third wedding, the princess decides to see who her husband really is, by lighting a lamp at night. The prince wakes and, feeling betrayed, reveals he was enchanted and a maiden who could love him without seeing his true face for seven years could have broken the curse. The prince becomes a bear and takes the princess to his three sisters, who are taking care of their children and each gives the princess three golden objects (a golden spinning wheel, a golden thread and a golden bobbin). The bear takes her to the foot of the Glass Mountain and leaves her there. A blacksmith fashions her a pair of iron shoes so she can climb the steep mountain. The princess uses the three golden objects to bribe the false bride for three nights with her husband. The tale was republished in 1970 with its classification: AT 425A.

=== Prince White-Bear (Kamp) ===
Folktale collector Jens Kamp collected another Danish variant from Vendsyssel with the title Prinds Hvidbjørn ("Prince White-Bear"). In this tale, a king has three daughters, the youngest his favourite and his two elders haughty and proud. One day, the king enters a mist-covered forest, when a bear appears and promises to help him in exchange for his youngest daughter. The king refuses twice and continues his way, but on the third time, he accepts the offer. Some time later, the bear visits the king to get the third princess, but the man tricks and passes his two elders as the princess. The bear asks the girl a riddle to check the girl's identity and only the third princess answers it. The bear takes the princess to a splendid castle. They live as husband and wife and she gives birth to three children in the next few years, two boys and a girl. However, the bear takes her children away from her. She laments over the fact that she cannot see her children, so at least she can see her family. The bear agrees to take her to her sister's wedding, but warns her to only listen to her father, not to her mother nor her sisters. The princess is told by her mother and sisters to light a candle at night to see his true face. She returns to the bear's castle and does just that; she sees a handsome man on her bed and inclines to kiss him, but three drops of candlewax fall on his chest. The bear awakes and tells his wife she should have waited for seven years for his curse to be broken, but now it is too late. He becomes a bear and takes the princess to his sisters' castles, where their children are being cared for. Each of her sisters-in-law gives her a dress and a golden object: she gets from the first a golden dress and a spinning wheel, from the second a silver dress and a golden heel, and from the third a bronze dress and a golden thread-winder. The bear departs without her and arrives at the Glass Mountain. Meanwhile, the princess meets a blacksmith who fashions her a pair of metal shoes to climb the mountain. She does and arrives at a castle, where she finds work as a servant. Her husband is to be married to his stepmother's daughter, and the princess uses the dresses and golden objects to trade for three nights with her husband.

=== Whitebear King's Son (Kristensen) ===
Author Evald Tang Kristensen published a Danish tale titled Hvidbjörn kongesön ("Whitebear King's Son"): a king is riding his horse when it becomes stuck in the mud and cannot move. A white bear appears and offers his help, in exchange for the king's youngest daughter as his bride. The king refuses at first, but, seeing that he horse is slowly sinking, decides to agree to the bear's terms. The king returns home and tries to deceive the bear by sending two maidservants in the princess's clothes, but he discovers the ruse and angrily demands the princess, as it was part of their deal. The king delivers his daughter to the white bear and the animal takes the girl to the woods. At night, she sleeps and someone comes to her bedside. Time passes, and the bear tells her that her elder sister is getting married, and takes her to the wedding, with a warning that she is to listen to her father, not her mother. She visits her parents and mentions that she sleeps in the dark at night, and her mother gives her a flint to better see at night. She goes back home and bears a son who the bear takes away. Next, her middle sister is getting married, and the bear takes her to visit her parents for the merry occasion. Again, she talks to her mother, who gives her some candles. She then gives birth to another boy, who is also taken by the bear to another place. Finally, the princess third sister is also getting married, and the bear takes her to attend the wedding. After a while, she also gives birth to a third boy, who is taken by the bear. Some time later, the princess decides to light the candle her mother gave her on the white bear, and discovers he is a human prince. A drop of candlewax falls on his body and he wakes up. He then explains a witch cursed him into bear form, and alternated between ursine form by day and human shape at night, and if she had lived with him in the cave for 4 years without lighting a candle, he would have turned back into human. The bear takes her on his back and they pass by three apple trees, one of copper, another of silver and the third of gold, which the bear tells the princess to pluck. Next, they pass by three houses that belong to the bear's sisters, where the princess trades the apples to her children for a goldenrod (in the first house), a silver willow tree (in the second house) and a copper yarn. At last they reach a glass mountain, which the white bear climbs but leaves his wife at the foot. The princess commissions some iron shoes from a nearby blacksmith and scales the mountain. Up there, she meets a witch, whom she gives the three metal objects so she can spend a night in her husband's quarters. She tries to wake him up on the first two nights, but the witch has given him a sleeping potion; and only manages to wake him up on the third night. He recognizes her and decides to kill the witch and her daughter with a steel sword. It happens so, and the glass mountain crumbles apart to reveal the prince's golden castle, where he lives with the princess and his three children.

=== Whiteking's Son (Kristensen) ===
In another tale collected from Gjern by Kristensen with the title Hvibekongens søn ("Whiteking's Son"), a gentleman has three daughters. Before he leaves on a trip, he asks his daughters what he can bring them: the elder asks for a golden rod, the middle one for a golden hinge and the youngest for a flower like a "violen". The man buys the golden objects his elders requested, but cannot find the flower, until he passes by a garden and plucks the flower. When he tries to mount on his horse, someone grabs his leg and warns him to give in return the first thing that greets him. The gentleman agrees, thinking his little white dog will be the one to greet him, but, when he goes back home, it is his youngest daughter. Remembering the voice at the garden, he tries to renege on the deal by sending two maidservants in the girl's place: for two consecutive nights, a maidservant waits outside the house, and someone comes and asks her to climb onto their back. The person discovers the ruse and demands the youngest daughter. The man relents and delivers his daughter to the person, who takes her to a magnificent castle. The voice tells her not to light anything in the castle at night, and they live like this. At one time, the girl gives birth to a boy who the voice brings to his sister. Some time later, the girl's elder sister is getting married, and the voice allows her to pay them a visit, but warns her to listen to her father, not her mother. Next, she has two other sons in consecutive pregnancies, who are taken by the voice and given to the voice's kin. Finally, the girl's other sister is getting married, and she is allowed to visit them. On this occasion, her mother gives her a candle and matches, so she can use them to illuminate her room at night. Back at the voice's palace, she lights the candle and sees a handsome man at her bedside, but drops some candlewax on his body. He wakes up and adminishes his wife, explaining that he is a king's son, cursed to marry a witch that lives on a glass mountain southwards of the sun, westward of the moon, and three miles east of the Tower of Babylon. The girl agrees to accompany him during his journey to the glass mountain, and they pass by three houses that belong to his three siblings. In the first house, shining like the Moon, she finds one of her children playing with a golden nut, which her sister-in-law gives her. Next, they pass by the prince's brother's house, where the girl finds another son, and is given a golden acorn. Lastly, they pass by the third house, which radiated light like a rising Sun, where she finds her third child and is given a golden apple. At last, they reach the glass mountain, which he manages to climb and brings his wife up, but she slips down to its foot. Fortunately, the girl asks a blacksmith to fashion iron instruments she uses to climb the slippery mountain and enter the witch's castle. The girl takes out the golden fruits to bribe the witch for a night with her husband, managing to talk to him on the third night. He recognizes her and they hatch a plan to punish the witch. The next morning, the girl sits at the table and narrates her story. The witch mocks her tale, and the prince asks her how they should punish a person who tries to keep two people apart. Without realizing it, the witch pronounces her own sentence, which is duly carried out. The prince and his wife live together in the castle atop the glass mountain.

== See also ==
- The Brown Bear of Norway
- White-Bear-King-Valemon
- East of the Sun and West of the Moon
- Whitebear Whittington
