= Sigurd, the King's Son =

Icelandic fairy tale about an animal bridegroom

Sigurd, the King's Son (Icelandic: Sigurður kóngsson) is an Icelandic fairy tale collected and published by author Jón Árnason. It is related to the international cycle of the Animal as Bridegroom or The Search for the Lost Husband, wherein a human princess marries a prince under an animal curse, loses him and has to search for him.

== Source ==
Philologist Adeline Rittershaus identified its origin as a manuscript from Pastor Jón Kristjánsson, of Yztafell.

== Summary ==
A king and a queen with four daughters ruled a great empire. One day, on a hunt, the king gets lost while following a deer, and finds a seemingly abandoned house. He enters it and sees a set table and a bed prepared for someone, but no one in sight, save for a little red-brown dog. He spends some time in the house and leaves, but as soon as he walks down the road, the little red-brown dog stops him. The dog complains that he welcomed the king in his home, and he is leaving without thanking him. The dog threatens him, unless he gives the first thing that greet the king on his way back, saying that he will come in three days to get whatever it is.

The fourth and youngest daughter greets her father and the king reveals to his family the incident. The king tries to elude the dog by sending others' daughters in her place, but the dog notices the deceit and returns to claim his prize. She climbs onto the red-brown dog and both run through the forest until reaching a house. The princess notices that the dog is such by day and a man by night.

One day, she becomes pregnant and her husband says that their child will be taken from them, and the she must not shed a tear, unless she does it on a kerchief he gave her. The first time, it happens to her daughter: she leans over the child's cradle, as a shadow appears by the window and a vulture snatches the child. In the meantime, the fourth princess and her dog husband visit her family on the occasion of the wedding of her three elder sisters, bearing splendid gifts, but refraining from revealing too much of her new life. When she next gives birth (to another daughter and to a boy), the same happened: the shadow and the vulture come and steal the baby.

On the occasion of the wedding of her third sister, the princess is accosted by her mother and reveals to her the whole story, and about the man that comes at night. The queen gives her a flint to light up and see his true face. The princess follows her mother's orders and sees her husband's true face. He wakes up and laments that she couldn't wait a bit more as his curse was nearly breaking. He tells her his story: his name is Sigurd, the son of a king who was cursed by his step-mother for not marrying her daughter; he was to stay a dog during the day, but remain a man at night, for 10 years, unless he found another princess willing to marry him, bear his three children (that would be taken from her as soon as they were born) and to never see his face. The husband disappears and she begins a journey towards his father's kingdom to stop the wedding with the step-sister.

The heroine passes by an old man's house, then another's, and meets her children playing with an old woman. She reaches Sigurd's castle, after the wedding, and buys three nights with her husband with a golden comb, a necklace and finally a mirror. For two nights, she pours her heart out to him, who lies asleep, but on the third night, he recognizes her.

== Translations ==
Adeline Rittershaus translated the tale into German as Der braune Hund ("The Brown Dog"). The tale was also translated into English as Sigurdur the King's Son.

== Analysis ==
=== Tale type ===
The tale is classified in the international Aarne-Thompson-Uther Index as type ATU 425A, "The Animal as Bridegroom". in this tale type, the heroine is a human maiden who marries a prince that is cursed to become an animal of some sort. She betrays his trust and he disappears, prompting a quest for him.

=== Motifs ===
The motif of the separation of the heroine from her children is located by scholarship across Celtic and Germanic speaking areas.

In his study about Cupid and Psyche and other "animal bridegroom" tales, scholar Jan-Öjvind Swahn surmised that the animal husband appears as a dog in Germanic and Celtic areas. In addition, to him, the wolf as the animal husband developed in Germanic areas.

According to Hans-Jörg Uther, the main feature of tale type ATU 425A is "bribing the false bride for three nights with the husband". In fact, when he developed his revision of Aarne-Thompson's system, Uther remarked that an "essential" trait of the tale type ATU 425A was the "wife's quest and gifts" and "nights bought".

== Variants ==
=== Iceland ===
In a tale collected from teller Herdís Jónasdóttir in Húsafell with the title The Tale of the Dog Móri, a human princess marries a dog (Prince Sigurdur). They live three years together and have three children (two girls and a boy), who are taken by a vulture as soon as they are born. After the kidnapping, the dog husband returns, congratulates her obedience and gives her a gift (a gold chess set, a gold ring and a mirror). When the princess's third sister is marrying, she visits her family and her mother gives her a pebble to use on her husband. The prince feels betrayed and reveals to his wife he is a prince cursed by his stepmother, and must return to his palace. The princess goes after him, passes by three little houses and finds her children under the care of a person. They direct her to a mountain. She climbs up the mountain, finds her husband and bribes the false bride with the objects her husband gave her.

=== Europe ===
==== Sweden ====
Swedish folktale collectors George Stephens and Gunnar Olof Hyltén-Cavallius collected a Swedish tale from Södermanland with the title Ulf-Prinsen ("Wolf Prince"), which they grouped it under the banner Jungfrun, som såg på sin Käraste vid Ljus ("The Maiden who looked at her husband with a [source of] light"). In this tale, a king finds a flea on his daughter's hair, fattens it and uses its hide as part of a suitor riddle. A wolf appears in court and guesses it right. However, the king tries to trick the wolf with daughters of other people, but he notices and returns. On the third time, the king relents and gives the wolf his daughter, as promised. The wolf takes the princess to its lair in the mountain, and she discovers a grand atrium by descending a staircase. The wolf and the princess live as man and wife, and she gives birth to three children in the following seven years. However, each time a human child is born (two sons and a daughter), the wolf takes the child between its teeth and takes the baby to the forest. Eventually, the princess is invited to her father's wedding to a new queen. The princess tells her new stepmother about her life with the, and the stepmother gives her a three-armed candlestick to use to spy on her wolf husband at night. The wolf husband (in human form) wakes up and laments that his wolf curse would have broken in three months, reveals that their three sisters are in his sisters' good hands, turns back into a wolf and rushes to the castle of the troll witch that cursed him. The princess goes after him and passes by the houses of her sisters-in-law, where she receives a golden distaff from the first, an apple in bright gold colour from the second, and a golden harp. The princess continues her search for her husband by following a trail of pebbles the wolf places for her. The trail stops before a grand sea that she needs to cross through. She uses the harp to tame a large gray wolf with the song and she rides the wolf across the sea. At last, the princess reaches the troll witch's castle, where she finds work in the kitchen. She uses the golden objects to bribe the troll princess (the false bride) for a night with her husband.

In a Swedish tale collected by Eva Wigström, with the title Kung Vollermansson ("King Vollermanson"), a king and queen have three daughters. Before he goes on a journey, the king asks the princesses what they want: the two elders ask for beautiful dresses, and the youngest for three singing leaves she saw in a dream. The king, on his journey, buys the dresses, but the singing leaves are impossible to find. He enters the woods and sees the tree. He snaps a branch and, before he leaves, a black dog appears and admonishes him for taking the branch. The dog demands the king offers in exchange the first thing that greets him on the way back. The youngest does, learns the whole story and offers to surrender herself to the dog. They live a married life, the dog becoming human while in the castle. She gives birth to three children, but they are taken from her by her husband. She hears the wedding bells coming from her father's kingdom and visits her family on the occasion of the wedding of her two sisters and her brother. On the third visit, she confides in her mother about the uncertain fate of the children, and her husband's curse. The queen tells her to prick his skin with a knife at night, in order to draw his blood. The princess does as advised and the dog prince awakes. He tells her that his curse would have ended in a few hours, but now he has to travel to the castle of the witch that cursed him. He changes back into a dog and takes his wife on his back. They reach three houses where she is asked by her husband to ask for food and shelter in the name of Kung Vollermanson, and, if she sees a child, must not kiss them. On the third house, she receives a staff, but, when she exits the house, the dog has vanished.

==== Denmark ====
In a Danish tale collected by Evald Tang Kristensen with the title Hundebruden ("The Dog's Bride"), a couple have three daughters, Ane, Hanne and Marie, the youngest their favourite. One day, the man has to travel and asks his daughters what presents he can get them: Ane wants a scarf, Hanne a ribbon and Marie a lovely wreath. During the journey, the man finds presents for his elders, but has no luck finding the wreath, until he sights on a small hill a dog sat on a wreath. The dog makes a deal with the man: he will give him the wreath, in exchange for the first thing that greets the man when he goes home. The man agrees and takes the wreathe to Marie, but, when he goes home, it is Marie who greets him. The man talks to his wife about the deal with the dog. The dog appears the next day to fetch his bride. The couple tries to trick the dog with Marie's elder sisters, but the dog discovers the ruse, returns and takes Marie with him. Marie and the dog live together. One day, Marie learns that her elder sister, Ane, is marrying, and wants to visit her. The dog lets her go to Ane's wedding, but asks her not to heed any suggestion to see his true form at night. Some years later, Marie also wants to visit her parents, since her middle sister Hanne is marrying. The dog lets her go to the wedding. There, before she returns to the dog's house, a wedding guest advises her to take a sword to her room at night and cut off the dog's head, so that his curse can be broken. Marie follows the guest's advice and cuts off the dog's head. She discovers a prince in its place. The prince laments this fact and tells her a witch turned him into a little white dog, and now he will take Marie to the foot of the Glass Hill where the witch lives. The prince takes Marie to visit his three sisters and leave one of their children with each woman. Before they depart to the Glass Hill, each of her sisters-in-law gives Marie a nut to crack in time of distress. The prince leaves Marie at the foot of the Glass Hill, and climbs it. As per her husband's advice, Marie waits for seven years for her hair and nails to grow, so she can use the nails to climb the Glass Hill. Marie climbs it and reaches the witch's castle, where she finds work. She takes a bath and clips her nails. Then, remembering the three nuts, Marie cracks open each nut to produce golden objects, which she uses trade for three nights with her husband.

In another Danish tale collected by Kristensen with the title Hundens kjæreste ("The Hound's Beloved"), a man has three daughters. One day, he goes to the Aalborg Market to find gifts for his three daughters. He buys presents for the first two, but cannot find any for the youngest. The man passes by Restrup and finds a rose in a garden. He goes to pluck the rose, but a large man stops him and asks, in return, for the first thing that greets him on his way home. The man returns home and his youngest daughter greets him. He laments the fact, but tries to deceive the large man by sending other women in her place. The large man discovers the tricks and takes the man's youngest daughter. They live as man and wife, the large man becoming a large dog and sleeping by the stove, and becoming a man by night. In their residence, the woman avoids lighting any source of light. The girl and the hound man have three children, but they are taken from her. The girl visits her family on the occasion of her each of her sisters' weddings. After the second wedding, the girl gets a box of matches to light up her bridal bed at night. She does and discover the human form of her husband. He wakes up and reveals that a mountain witch curses him. Now, they must part, but he will take her to his sisters' houses. In each of her sisters-in-law's houses, the girl finds a child, who gives her a golden dress, a golden twig and a golden spinning wheel. The large hound then takes his wife to the mountain and climbs it. The girl goes after him and buys three nights with her husband with the gifts her children gave her.

==== Faroe Islands ====
Faroese linguist Jakob Jakobsen collected a tale from the Faroe Islands with the title Vetil kongasonur ("Vetil, the King's Son"). In this tale, a poor farmer promises his daughter to a wolf, who is lupine by day and human by night. They marry and she has three human children, which are taken from her as soon as they are born. After she visits her mother, the girl is advised to use a knife on her husband to confirm if he is human. She does as advised and her husband disappears. She goes on a quest for him and finds her three children in three houses, where she also gains splendid dresses. She finally reaches her destination: a glass mountain, impossible to reach on foot. An old man tells her she must wear iron garments, iron boots and iron gloves to climb it. She does and enters a castle, where her husband is to be married to a sorceress. The girl bribes the sorceress with the three splendid dresses for three nights with the prince: the first time, a blue one; the second time, a green one, and a red one in the third time. Vetil's daughter tries to wake him up on the first two nights, but fails, since he is lying asleep on an enchanted pillow, but manages to talk to him on the final night.

=== Africa ===
==== Western Africa ====
In a variant in the Nga'ka language published by professor Emmi Meyer with the title Vom Mädchen, das einen Leoparden heiratete ("The Girl who married a Leopard"), the king finds a termite and fattens it to use its skin in an engagement riddle for his daughter. A man comes, guesses it is a termite skin and wins the princess. He walks with her and makes her promise not to take any blade with her. He becomes a leopard and takes her to their house. She gives birth to two children, who are taken from her by unknown forces. When she returns to her father, she takes a knife with her to prove if her husband is truly a man. She hurts him and lights a fire in their bedchambers and he disappears. She goes on a quest for him and finds him soon to be married to another bride. Scholar Jan-Öjvind Swahn, in his monograph on the Cupid and Psyche cycle of stories, noted that this African tale contained a motif found in Scandinavian and Island Celtic variants: the heroine gives birth to her children and the babies are taken from her by strange powers - which would link the story to European tradition.

==== Southern Africa ====
Africanist Sigrid Schmidt created a whole system of classification for Khoisan folktales. Tale type 425A, in this system, was numbered KH 1048 and named "The girl on quest for her vanished bridegroom, who was a dog during the day and a man at night (AaTh 425A)", or Der Mann in Hundegestalt ("The Husband in Dog-Form").

She provided the summary of a Southern African tale collected from a female informant who heard the story from her Grikwa greatgrandmother. In this tale, a man takes off its dog skin at night to sleep with the king's daughters, until one day the princesses hide the dogskin and he vanishes. One of the princesses goes after him. On the journey, she helps an old woman by carrying a jug of water and gains a magical pair of scissors. She reaches another kingdom, where the man is married to another wife. The princess trades the scissors for one night with the man, but the new wife puts a sleeping potion in his drink. The princess manages to help him recover his memory by showing him his dogskin, a wedding ring and a photo. Schmidt supposed that this tale might have come from a foreign source, since, according to Swahn, the motif of the dog husband and the magical scissors as the item the heroine receives appear in Celtic tradition. This led her to suppose the tale migrated from Great Britain, possibly from a Scottish or an Irish tradition.

== See also ==
- Black Bull of Norroway
- The Brown Bear of Norway
- The Daughter of the Skies
- The Tale of the Hoodie
- The Three Daughters of King O'Hara
- White-Bear-King-Valemon
- East of the Sun and West of the Moon
- Prince Hat under the Ground
- The Iron Stove
- The Enchanted Pig (ATU 441 and ATU 425A)
- Whitebear Whittington
- The Serpent Prince
