= The Tale of the Little Dog =

Fairy tale from the Sami people

The Tale of the Little Dog (Russian: "Собачья сказка") is a fairy tale from the Sami people collected by ethnographer Vladimir V. Charnolusky, about a girl that marries a youth under a canine skin, betrays his secret and goes after him when he disappears. It is related to the international cycle of the Animal as Bridegroom or The Search for the Lost Husband, wherein a human maiden marries a man under an animal curse, loses him and has to search for him. Variants have been collected from oral tradition from Sámi tellers.

== Source ==
According to Vladimir V. Charnolusky, the tale was collected in 1927 from a female teller named Kuropteva Varvara Ivanovna.

== Summary ==
An old woman laments the fact that she does not have any sons, so prays to have a son, even if he is a little dog. So she gives birth to a dog. The little dog helps his old parents with daily chores. One day, he wants to marry, so his parents arrange for his marriage with a human girl. The bride goes to live with the dog in the barn, but, on the wedding night, she becomes so afraid the dog becomes enraged and kills her. The dog's parents arrange another bride for him, who treats him kindly and shares her food with him. They move out to the barn and live like husband and wife. The girl discovers her husband takes off the dogskin at night and becomes a handsome man, and keeps the secret to herself.

One day, the old woman inquires her daughter-in-law about their life together, and the girl tells her about the dogskin. The old woman promises to burn the dogskin to keep him human. The next morning, the dog husband (now human) cannot find the skin, and escapes from home. His wife wakes up after him and does not see him in bed. She hears his voice, telling her to wear out three iron canes in search for him.

The girl fashions the three iron canes and walks about for three years, until she reaches the house of an old sorceress. The sorceress welcomes her in and says the husband lives with a rich "shalyutka" named Ulitta in their city, gives the girl a copper comb, and tells her to take out the comb and use it on her hair when her husband is playing a ball game. The girl follows her instructions and goes to the nearby city and waits for her husband. He throws the ball, which lands at her feet. She takes the ball and withholds it, and tells the player she wishes to give Ulitta a message: she will return the ball if Ulitta allows the girl to sleep by their doorstep at night. It happens thus.

The next day, the old sorceress gives the girl a silver comb, with the same piece of advice. The girl withholds the ball again and announces she will return it if Ulitta allows her to sleep by her husband's feet. On the third day, she is given a golden comb, and withholds the ball until Ulitta allows the girl to sleep in their bed at night. On each night, the girl cries for her husband, and, on the third night, her tears stain her husband's shirt. He turns to her, recognizing his wife and embracing her. Ulitta sees the sleeping pair, takes her box of golden treasures and jumps into the sea, never to be seen again. The girl and her dog husband (now human) return to his parents.

== Analysis ==
=== Tale type ===
The tale is classified in the international Aarne-Thompson-Uther Index as type ATU 425A, "The Animal as Bridegroom". In this tale type, the heroine is a human maiden who marries a prince that is cursed to become an animal of some sort. She betrays his trust and he disappears, prompting a quest for him.

=== Motifs ===
According to Hans-Jörg Uther, the main feature of tale type ATU 425A is "bribing the false bride for three nights with the husband". In fact, when he developed his revision of Aarne-Thompson's system, Uther remarked that an "essential" trait of the tale type ATU 425A was the "wife's quest and gifts" and "nights bought".

In other stories (from Europe, mostly), the heroine's helpers may be three old crones, or her husband's relatives.

According to A. Ermolov, the dog holds an important place in Sami folklore, and this is reflected in Sami tales about the dog as bridegroom, such as "Человек-собака" ("Youth-Dog").

== Variants ==
=== Hunter in Dog Skin ===
In a Saami tale collected by A. Ermolov with the title "Охотник в собачьей шкуре" ("Hunter in Dog Skin"), a poor old couple have no children. The wife wishes to have a son with dog snout, and one is born to them, also in dog skin. Some time later, the dog asks his father to find him a bride while he goes hunting. The old man brings home a girl ad they sit to eat. The potential bride eats her dish of meat and throws the bones to the dog bridegroom, who takes her to the barn and kills her, demanding another bride from his parents. The same events happen to a second girl. Finally, the couple find him a third bride, and they sit to eat: the girl shares her meal with the dog, which greatly pleases him, so much so he takes her to the barn and takes off the canine skin to become a handsome youth. They spend the night together. The next day, the old wife finds her son without the dogskin, and tells her daughter-in-law to steal the dogskin while he is asleep and give it to her so she can burn it. The girl follows her mother-in-law's suggestion, and the skin is burnt. The now human dog son wakes up, admonishes his bride and tells her she can only find him by wearing down three pairs of iron shoes, three walking iron canes, and have three iron discs melt in her mouth, then vanishes. A smith forges her the requested objects and she begins her journey: she passes by three huts that spin on chicken legs, and gains three combs, one copper, the second silver and the third golden. At the third hut, she is advised by its dweller to go to the churchyard where her husband is playing ball with another woman named Katerina, take out the combs and use them on her hair; they will throw the ball which she must catch, and make a promise to return it if Katerina allows the girl to spend a night with her husband. It happens thus: Katerina allows the girl to spend the night near the threshold, then near the husband's bed, and lastly near him. Katerina listens to the girl's woes and gets out of bed. She takes a box with sewing material from her room, goes to the seashore and throws its contents in the water, ordering them to become seashells, starfishes and coral. Katerina then goes away, and the now human dog son lives with his bride.

=== Dog Skin (Kert) ===
Russian Finno-Ugricist Georgy Martynovitch Kert collected a Sami tale from Lovozero titled p'ennɛ tor̩r̩k, which he translated to Russian with the title "Собачья шкура" ("Dog Skin"). In this tale, an old couple long to have a son, and the old woman wishes they could have a son with human face and dogskin, thus one is born to them. Time passes, and the dog son asks his parents to find him a bride, from one of three sisters of a neighbour. The first daughter is welcomed by the old couple, and she hears a dog barking, which the old couple explain is her bridegroom. They sit to eat, and the girl gives only bones to the dog son. In retaliation, he kills the elder girl, and requests another wife: the girl's middle sister, who suffers the same fate after she gives bones to the dog. Finally, the third sister goes to the old couple's house and is told of the dog son. They sit to eat, and she shares meat and bread with him. In return, the dog son takes his bride to the barn and removes the dogskin, becoming a handsome youth to sleep beside her. They live like this for a while, until the bride decides to take the dogskin and burn it. The dog son smells the burning and laments that his bride destroyed it, since he would have become human in three years time. He then says she will only find him after she wears down three pairs of iron shoes, three walking canes made of iron, and melting three pewter discs in her mouth, then vanishes. After wearing down the iron garments, she reaches a big city and finds him among some ball players. They kick the ball so hard it falls next to the bride. She takes the ball and promises to return it if he allows her to sleep in his bedroom for one night. It happens again the next day, when she offers to sleep by the foot of his bed, and the day after, when she offers to sleep behind him, and pours out her woes to make him remember her. She does on the third night, and he recognizes her. Now reunited, they have a child together, and return to the dog son's parents.

=== Beautiful Katerina (Kert) ===
Kert collected another Sami tale, sourced from Teriberka with the title mod'žes' Katrenˈ which he translated to Russian as "Прекрасная Катерина" ("Prekrasnaya Katerina" or "Beautiful Katerina"). In this tale, an old couple wishes for a son with a dog nose. They have one who slowly becomes a dog as the years pass, until he assumes a full canine shape. Some time later, the dog asks for his father to find him a bride, and the man brings home a girl. The girl and the dog go into the barn, and the dog takes off the canine skin to become a handsome youth with a red shirt, black hair and white face. They spend the night together, and the man puts on the dog skin in the morning. The old woman asks her daughter-in-law about the nature of the dog son, and the girl answers that he is human, and places the doskin by the door. The following night, the old woman steals the dogskin while her son is asleep, and burns it. The human dog son smells the burning, laments the fact, and runs away to parts unknown. The girl rushes after him and passes by three houses where an old lady lives: in each of them, she is told her husband is living with a woman named Beautiful Katerina, is given a pole and a comb (copper, silver, and gold), and is advised to go to the city where her husband is playing a ball game, withhold the ball and only promise to return it if Katerina allows her to spend a night with her husband. It happens thus: the girl stays near the game and combs her hair with the metallic utensil, then asks Katerina to stay with her husband in exchange for the ball. On the third night, the girl pours out her woes next to her husband, and Katerina listens to it, gets out of bed, takes a box of sewing with her and jumps into the sea: she becomes a stingray and some needles become grains of sand. The girl and the now human dog husband live together and have a son, then return to his parents' house. At the end of the tale, the old couple die and become ashes and peat.

=== Tale about a Dog (Itkonen) ===
In a tale from the Ter Sámi collected by T. I. Itkonen with the title ṕi̯e̯ańn^{a̯}i màinɐ̃s, and translated into Finnish as Koiran satu ("A Dog's Tale") and into Hungarian as Mese a kutyáról ("The Tale about a Dog"), an old man and an old woman have no children, and pray to God for a daughter, a kitten, or a puppy as their child. So God gives them a puppy. The little dog brings them food from the forest, and, one day, wishes their parents to find him a wife. The old woman meets a neighbour woman and asks for her elder daughter as wife for her dog son. The old woman brings the girl in and advises her to call the dog a human. The elder girl sees the dog bridegroom and gives him bones, then goes with him to bed. When she utters the word dog, the dog son feels insulted and kills the girl. This repeats again with the middle daughter. When it is the younger daughter's turn, the girl calls the dog a person, and sleeps in their joint bed. Some time later, the dog's mother asks the girl about their marital life, and the girl says the dog takes off the canine skin to become a youth at night. The dog's mother, then, says she will prepare a small fire near their bed, and her daughter-in-law must throw the dogskin in the fire to burn it. It happens thus. The human dog husband smells the burning and sees the burnt dogskin, then tells his wife she will not find him, unless she has three branches in hand and hold three burning skeins until she reaches him. He vanishes. The girl then buys the three branches and three skeins, and walks until she finds her husband, already married to another woman who is the daughter of the Áhceks. The girl goes to bed with the human dog husband and the Áhceks's daughter together, and to whom the youth turns to in his sleep, he shall consider his wife. The girl hides an iron comb in her vests, and her husband turns to her. As for the Ácehks's daughter, she sees that the youth turned to the other girl, shrieks and turns into a cricket. The human dog husband and his wife return to his parents' house. In a review of Swedish scholar Jan-Öjvind Swahn's work of Cupid and Psyche and related "animal bridegroom" tales, folklorist Walter Anderson followed Swahn's classification and indexed the tale as subtype B of type AaTh 425. (Note: For clarification: Swahn's type B corresponds to type ATU 425A of the international index: heroine journeys far and wide and gains objects to bribe the false bride.)

=== A Dog's Tale ===
Itkonen collected another tale from the Ter Sámi with the title pi̯e̯nna̯i̯ māinas, and translated into Finnish as Koiran satu ("A Dog's Tale"). In this tale, an old woman and an old man bemoan their lack of a child, and wish to have a son with a dog's snout, so one is born to them in the shape of a dog. One day, the dog rushes to the woods, and the couple think the animal left, but he returns with meat for their meal. Later, the dog asks his mother to find him a wife. The old woman goes to a male neighbour who has three daughters, and brings the elder daughter with her as a prospective daughter-in-law. As she approaches the house, the girl complains about the smell of dog manure near the couple's house. The couple prepare dinner for themselves and their dog son, and they refer to him as a person when he knocks on the door. The elder girl opens the door and states that a dog is at the door. Also, during dinner, the girl gives bones to the dog. When the dog and the elder girl go to the barn to sleep, she treats him like a dog and he kills her, insulted by her actions. The dog son then asks for another bride, and the middle daughter is brought to him. She does the same things as her elder sister and is killed for it. Finally, the younger sister goes to the couple's house and treats the dog with kindness: refers to him as a person, shares her meal with whim and goes to sleep in the barn with him. That same night, the dog takes off the canine skin and becomes a handsome youth. He complains his feet are cold, and the girl covers them with his dogskin. His mother, however, takes the skin and burns it. The human dog smells the burning and notices the missing dogskin. He then tells his wife he will disappear, and his wife can only find him after she wears down three pairs of iron shoes, three iron canes and following three yarns, after three years. The girl prepares the iron garments and goes after him, passing by the houses of three witches that spin on legs: the elder two do not know, and direct her to their younger sister. The third witch says her husband is living with a woman named Syöjätär and has children. As a last help, the witch gives the girl a brush, which she must use to bribe Syöjätär for a night with her husband. The girl follows her advice and trades the brush for a night in her husband's bed, but he does not move. On the second night, the witch gives her a golden loom she uses to trade for another chance to be near him, but he does not nudge. Lastly, the witch gives the girl a golden ring which she uses to bribe for a last night with the human dog husband. On the third night, the human dog husband turns to his true wife and notices her. Syöjätär shrieks in despair and bursts in two. They kill Syöjätär's children and leave on a flying chest back to the dog son's parents' house. In a review of Swedish scholar Jan-Öjvind Swahn's work of Cupid and Psyche and related "animal bridegroom" tales, folklorist Walter Anderson followed Swahn's classification and indexed the tale as subtype B of type AaTh 425.

=== Penyy Alke ===
In a Saami tale titled "Пеный Альке" ("Penyy Alke"; "Dog Son"), an elderly couple lament the fact that, in their old age, they have no son, so they pray to God to give one, even if he is a little dog. So a little dog is born to them. They raise him as their son and, one day, the little dog asks his parents to find him a wife. His parents bring him a girl, and they go to bed. The next morning, the couple see the dog killed his bride during the night, and he demands another one. They find another girl, whom the dog also kills. The third time, his prospective third bride is advised by her neighbours that she should clean the floor of her parents-in-law's house, prepare the bed for them, share her food with the dog and caress him. The girl obeys and cleans the old couple's house, and treats the dog with kindness. Then they go to bed. The next day, the old couple find the girl alive and calmly sleeping with the dog bridegroom. This goes on for a year. One day, the old woman asks her daughter-in-law about her son, and the girl tells her about the handsome husband he is without the dogskin. The old woman then tells the girl to leave the dogskin near the bed. It happens thus, and the old woman takes her son's dogskin to burn it. The dog son (in human form) senses his skin is burning, wakes up and says "an evil spirit rushed things", then runs away from home. The youth is still running, and the tale ends. The tale was later republished as "Собачий сын" ("Dog Son").

=== Beautiful Katerina (Patsya) ===
In a tale compiled by E. Ya. Patsya with the title "Красивая Катерина" ("Krasivaya Katerina" or "Beautiful Katerina"), an old couple is sad they have no child, neither a son, nor a daughter. One day, they wish for a child with a dog snout and a sheep's coat, and one is born to them. The animal son hunts for his parents and, one day, asks his father to bring him a bride. The old man finds him a girl and brings her home. The animal son comes home and eats with his prospective bride, who gives him bones to feed on. They later retire to the barn to sleep and the dog son kills his bride. The next day, he demands another bride, who also gives him bones to eat and is killed just like the first. The third time, the old man brings home a third girl, who shares her meat with him. They later retire to the barn to sleep. The girl survives the night, and lives with the animal son. Some time later, the old woman questions her daughter-in-law about the nature of her own son, and the girl answers he takes off the animal skin to become a handsome man wearing a bright red shirt. The old woman then thinks about making her son human forever and advises her daughter-in-law to take his animal skin and leave it near the foot of the bed, for she will take it and burn it. That same night, their plan works, and, the next morning, the man asks about his animal skin. His wife tells him his mother burnt it, and he tells the girl she will not find him until she wears down three pairs of iron shoes and three iron walking canes, and melt three tin discs on her mouth. She prepares the iron garments and goes after him, passing by three spinning huts. When she reaches each one, she commands the door to turn to her and its windows to forest to allow her entrance. In each house she meets a woman who says her husband passed nearby, and gains a hanger and a comb, the first of copper, the second of silver and the third of gold. The third woman reveals to the girl her husband is living with another woman named Katerina in a city, and the girl must comb her hair over the hanger. The girl reaches the city and sees Katerina and her husband playing a ball game; she follows the helpful woman's advice. Her husband is playing a ball game and the ball lands near the girl, who withholds the it and promises to return it to Katerina if the latter allows her to sleep near her husband's threshold for one night. It happens thus, but the girl's husband does not react at all. The next day, the girl returns the ball in exchange for one night near his bed. She fails again. On the third and last night, she gives the ball and asks to sleep by her husband's side. During the night, the girl cries, her tears staining her husband's shirt. He wakes up and recognizes her as his true wife. As for Katerina, she sees the spouses' reunion, takes a box of needles and sewing utensils and rushes to the sea: she throws its contents in the sea and commands them to become shells and coral, then runs away. The girl and her husband return to the old couple's house and live together.

=== Dog Son (Patsya) ===
In a tale translated by E. Ya. Patsya with the title "Собачий сын" ("Dog Son"), a poor widow lives in the churchyard of Pazretsky, and bemoans the fact she is old and has no one to help her in her old age. One day, she goes to the forest and sees an abandoned sieidi nearby. She decides to clean it up and prays to it to grant her a son, even if he has animal skin. Her prayer is answered and a boy is born to her, with animal skin and a human face. The boy hunts deer for her and brings game home. One day, he asks his mother for a bride, and the old widow wanders far and wide to another place, where she finds an old couple with three daughters. The elder daughter goes with the widow to her prospective bridegroom. They enter the hut and the widow tells her not to follow her. The girl looks around and sees some food being prepared in a leather bag. She goes to check on the food and the widow appears. She chastises the girl, saying her son needs an obedient wife and drives her out of her hut, where she turns into stone. The animal son returns home and asks about his bride, and his mother says she turned her to stone. The widow goes to fetch the middle daughter to her son, and the girl also fails her test, turning into stone. Lastly, the widow goes for the youngest daughter, and the girls' father asks her how many sons the widow has. Ignoring the question, the old widow brings the girl home with her, and she sees two human statues she recognizes as her sisters. The girl enters the house and pretends to fall asleep, passing the widow's test and meeting her dog bridegroom, whom she pets. The widow approves of her daughter-in-law and directs them to the barn to sleep. The next morning, the dog goes hunting, and both women are at home. The girl asks the widow to release her sisters, but the latter refuses. Time passes, and they settle into a routine. One day, however, the widow suspects something about her son and questions her daughter-in-law about it. The girl avoids answering it, and the widow makes a deal: she will free the girl's sisters, if she says anything about her husband. Torn at the offer - since she promised her husband to keep his secret -, the girl says he takes off the animal skin at night and becomes a handsome youth. As promised, the widow restores the two girls back to life, and both girls flee back home. As for her son, the widow wants to keep him human at all times, and asks her daughter-in-law about his dogskin. At night, the widow takes the dogskin and tosses it in the fire. The man wakes up and laments that he lost his skin before the appointed time set by the sieidi, and tells his wife she will only find him after she wears down three pairs of nutukas ("kangs", in the Russian text), and melt three tin buttons in her mouth. He vanishes. The old widow sews the nutukas for her daughter-in-law and the girl goes after her husband. The girl wears down the three pairs of nutukas and meets three "chakhkli", who each give her a bone comb, a silver comb, and a golden comb. She also learns that her husband has forgotten about her and found another wife. The girl finally reaches the city at the shore of the White Sea, and finds work there. One day, she sees her husband and his new wife playing ball, which lands at her feet. She returns the ball and takes out the bone comb to comb her hair. The second wife sees the comb and wishes to have it, and the girl trades for a night with her husband in the barn. The second wife gives the (now human) dog husband a sleeping potion, so his true wife cannot wake him up. The girl trades the other combs for more nights with her husband: she fails on the second night, but manages to wake him up on the third. The man remembers everything and takes his true wife back to his mother's house. As for the second wife, she throws the combs she gained into the White Sea, originating sea urchins. The tale was reprinted and sourced to the Saami of Kola Peninsula.

== See also ==
- Sigurd, the King's Son
- Prince Wolf
- The White Hound of the Mountain
