= Hermod and Hadvor =

Icelandic fairy tale

Hermod and Hadvor (Icelandic: Sagan af Hermóði og Háðvöru) is an Icelandic fairy tale collected and published by Jón Árnason. It tells the story of prince Hermod and his foster-sister princess Hadvor's conflicts with their evil-stepmother.

== Sources ==
In his Íslenzkir þjóður og ævintýri, published in 1862-1864, Jón Árnason identifies the tale's source as a manuscript written by Sveinbjörn Guðmundsson. An earlier poetic telling of the tale, titled Rímur af Hermóði, was written in the late 18th century by Eiríkur Laxdal.

== Summary ==
A king and a queen had a daughter, Princess Hadvor, and a foster son, Prince Hermod. One day, the Queen died. The King set to sea and found a beautiful woman along with a daughter and their maid. This woman told the King that she was the Queen of Hetland and had been driven from her land. The King married her, not knowing that the Queen and her daughter were both wicked witches.

Soon, the King went to war, and the stepmother told Prince Hermod that he had to marry her daughter. He refused, as he secretly loved Hadvor, and the angry Queen cursed him to go to a desert isle and be turned to a lion by day and a man by night, never to be freed until Hadvor burned his skin.

But Princess Hadvor became friendly with Queen's maid, Olof, who told Hadvor what had happened, and also informed him that the Queen planned to marry her off to a giant from the Underworld. When this monster did arrive, Hadvor was prepared and killed him with burning pitch. The Queen found the body and turned it into that of a man, then convinced the King that her brother has been murdered by the Princess. The King agreed to let the Queen punish Hadvor, but Olof again warned her in time.

Hadvor made her way to the sea. In a dream, a woman told her that she was leaving her a rope to climb the cliffs, a thread to follow to find Hermod, and a belt to keep her from going faint with hunger. Hadvor found these when she woke, and used them to find a cave. Hermod came there in the evening and shook off his lion skin; Hadvor burned it. A good Witch gave them a boat to get back, and saved them from a whale attack.

They arrived home. Hadvor told her father the whole story, and the evil Queen and her daughter were turned into a rat and a mouse and killed by Hermod. Hadvor and Hermod married, and reigned after the King's abdication, while Olof married a nobleman.

== Analysis ==
=== Tale type ===
The tale is classified according to the international Aarne-Thompson-Uther Index as type ATU 444, "Enchanted Prince Disenchanted." Another tale of this type is Habogi.

== Translations ==
Andrew Lang included an English version of the tale in The Yellow Fairy Book.
