= Whitebear Whittington =

Whitebear Whittington or White Bear Whittington is a character that appears in American folktales. He sometimes appears as a bear that marries a human maiden, in folktales of the Animal as Bridegroom type, a set of tales related to Cupid and Psyche, in that a human maiden marries an animal that is human in disguise, breaks a taboo and loses him, and she has to seek him out.

== Analysis ==
According to American folklorist Leonard W. Roberts, the name "Whitebear Whittington" appears in stories told in New York, North Carolina, and the Ozarks. William Edwin Bettridge and Francis Lee Utley suggested that the reoccurrence of his name (or variations thereof) indicate a possible Scandinavian origin of these narratives. Utley, in a later study, suggested that one tale from Virginia may have come from Norsemen or Swedish immigrants of Delaware.

== Tales ==
His stories are considered to be a local version of the tale East of the Sun and West of the Moon, told by the Southern Appalachian people. They are also considered a "traditional Appalachian tale".

These tales can be classified in the Aarne-Thompson-Uther Index as types ATU 425, "The Search for the Lost Husband"; ATU 425A, "The Animal as Bridegroom", or ATU 425C, "Beauty and the Beast". Researcher Carl Lindahl suggests that tale type ATU 425, which features a "powerful female character", is part of a repertoire of what he calls "American mountain märchen".

In relation to Whiteberry Whittington and White-Bear Whittington, folklorist Herbert Halpert noted that both tales "rationalized" or altogether replaced the white bear of the other tales for a normal man that wears a white coat made of bearskin.

=== Whitebear Whittington ===
In a tale collected by Richard Chase, a widowed father has three daughters. When he has to go to town, he asks his daughters what they want: the first a dress with the color of every bird in the sky, the second a dress with every color of the rainbow and the third a basketful of white roses.

The man finds a bush of white roses and breaks a bush. A voice demands him, in return, the first thing that greets him on his way back home. His youngest daughter is the first one to greet him. That night, the voice comes and demands his payment. The man sends his dog, but it returns scared. The two older sisters also go outside and meet whatever it is out there. The youngest surrenders herself and leaves the house. She finds a white bear, who asks her to climb onto his back. The girl cries so hard that her nose bleeds three drops on the bear's back.

They reach a house and the bear asks the girl to light a lamp. She does and a man stands where the bear was. He reveals that he is a bewitched combination of bear and human forms, but he can choose when he becomes one or the other. The girl chooses him to be a man at night. They live together and she gives birth to three children, two boys and a girl. She wants to visit her family and he warns her she must not reveal his name.

She goes with the bear and her children to her father's house. The sisters want to know everything the girl went through, but she refuses to tell them. The next day, the father talks to her in private and she reveals her husband's name: Whitebear Whittington. She then sees the husband in human form, three drops of blood on the back of his white shirt, going to Piney Mountain.

The girl tries to trail her husband to Piney Mountain, by following a trail of specked feathers left by a bird, for seven years. At last, she reaches the house of a very old woman, who takes her in and asks the girl to help her in some chores around the house: on the first day, the girl gathers the wool and washes it in the river, while the old woman cards; on the second day, she handles the carded wool for the old woman to spin; on the third day, the old woman works at her loom. As payment for her help, the old woman gives the girl a gold chinquapin nut (for the first day), a gold hickory nut (for the second day), and a golden walnut (for the third day), telling the girl to use them when she needs it the most.

The girl leaves the old woman's hut and reaches a fountain, where women are gathered trying to wash a bloodied shirt near a man, whom she recognizes as her husband, but he cannot seem to acknowledge her. The women are trying to wash the shirt because the man promised to marry one who could do it. The girl tries it herself and accomplishes it, but another girl snatches the shirt from her hands and shows it to the man, as if she was the one to do it. Tricked by the second girl, the man takes her to a house, and they prepare their wedding. The girl, Whitebear Whittington's true wife, follows after them, and cracks open the three golden nuts to produce golden artifacts (golden wool from the chinquapin; a fine spinning wheel from the hickory, and a big loom from the walnut) which she uses to buy her place at her husband's bed to stir him awake with a lamentation, begging him to awaken and see her.

The girl fails on the first two nights, because Whitebear Whittington is sound asleep on a sleepy pillow and was given a sleeping dram. After the second night, an old man alerts the Whitebear about a female voice singing and lamenting on his bedside. On the third night, Whitebear avoids driking the dram offered by the false bride and throws away the pillow, waiting the girl to come that same night. His true wife calls him by his name, and he recognizes her.

The next morning, Whitebear Whittington goes to talk to the false bride's father, and asks him a riddle about a lost old key, a new key he had made, and the old key he regained. The false bride's father answers Whitebear should keep the old key. Whitebear Whittington agrees with the old man, and takes his first wife back home with him.

=== Three Drops of Blood ===
In a variant from the Southern Mountains, collected from a man named Davis in 1996, Three Drops of Blood, a man and a woman who lives in the mountains fall in love, get married, and have three daughters. The father loves the youngest the most. One day, he has to go to town, but asks his daughters what he can get them. The first asks for a dress the "color of every tree in the forest once the frost stops coming in the springtime", the second for a dress "the color of every tree in the forest after the frost starts coming in the fall" and the youngest for flowers. He finds the dresses and goes to a clearing where there is a rosebush with white roses. The man tries to break a branch of the bush, but a mysterious voice threatens him if he keeps going. The voice promises to let him have the roses, but the man has to give in exchange the first thing that greets him when he goes back home. The man thinks it is his dog that will greet him and journeys back home.

Once he gets home, his youngest daughter greets him, to his immense grief, because now he has to let his daughter go to. That night, the same voice comes from outside the house and says it is "time to get paid". He sets his dog on whoever it is, but the animal does not return. The two elder sisters offer to go out and see what it is, but come back screaming. The youngest offers herself to the voice and goes out the house. She sees a great white bear, who tells her she must not be afraid and to climb onto his back. She obeys and both begin a trek through the woods. They pass by the bush of white roses and, when she picks up a rose, a thorn pricks her finger and three drops of blood land on the bear's back.

The girl and the bear reach a house and enter. As soon as the sun sets, the bear becomes a man and explains to her his story: his name is White Bear whittington, he is cursed into ursine form, but can choose whichever form for the night or the day. The girl chooses that he remain a bear by day and a man by night. They live together as husband and wife and have three children.

One day, the girl is feeling homesick and wants to visit her family. The bear warns her that an even worse curse shall befall him, but eventually concedes, as long as his wife does not tell her family anything about the bear. She takes home her three children and the family wants to know what happened to her, but she can't tell them. On her father's insistence, she whispers her husband's name in his ear. Then she sees her husband through the window, three drops of blood on the back of his white shirt.

She leaves the children with her family and goes after him, but loses his tracks. She arrives at an old woman's house who gives her shelter and work. After doing some work (shearing the sheep, carding and spinning the wool, and finally weaving some clothes), the old woman gives her three golden nuts: one as big as an acorn, another as big as a hickory nut, and lastly a third as big as a walnut, and sends her on her way.

She reaches a river where women are washing clothes, and sees her husband, now human. He says he doesn't remember his wife, but wants to see if any of the women can help him with the three drops of blood on his shirt. The girl is able to wash his clothes, but an "ole bad breath woman" grabs the cloth and passes it as her own accomplishment. The bad breath woman takes him to her house up on the hill.

The girl goes after them and gives her the nuts to spend three nights with White Bear Whittington: the first nut releases a golden thread, the second a golden spinning wheel, and the third gives out a golden loom. With the three objects together, they begin to weave gold cloth. The bad breath woman agrees to let the girl have three nights with White Bear, but she drugs him on the first two nights so that he does not notice anything untoward. The third night, White Bear listens to his true wife's lament and regains his memory.

Meanwhile, the false bride is locked outside the house and wants to be let in. The false bride's father wants to know why White Bear locked them outside, and White Bear gives them a riddle: "at first he had a golden key he lost, but found an iron key to replace the first. Now that he has the first key back, which key should he keep?". The false bride's father answers that he should keep the first key (which is referring to his first wife). White Bear and his true wife escape and return home.

=== Whiteberry Whittington ===
In a variant from Blue Ridge Mountains, Whiteberry Whittington, a hired boy named Whiteberry Whittington loves a hired girl, but also loves the king's daughter. So he decides to set a test for both women: whoever washes a stain from his shirt, he shall marry her. The hired girl accomplishes the task, but the king's daughter takes the credit and is set to marry Whiteberry Whittington. The hired girl is left crying, until an old woman asks her what the problem is. The hired girl says that the king's daughter left with the girl's husband, Whiteberry Whittington. The old woman offers to give her directions in exchange for one of her children. The girl concedes, but gains a fan and information on her husband: he lies upon a glassy hill, beyond the bloody seas. She meets other two old women who propose the same trade: the children for information on the husband, but also give her a comb and a string of beads. The girl uses the fan, the comb and the string of beads to bribe the king's daughter for three nights with Whiteberry. The tale was originally collected from a woman named Jane Hicks Gentry, from Hot Springs, North Carolina. She learned the tale from her grandfather, who learned from his mother.

=== White-Bear Whittington ===
In this tale, collected by Vance Randolph in 1950 from one Rose Spaulding, from Eureka Springs, Arkansas (Ozarks), three sisters live together. They are visited by a crippled old man that they help: the first by setting a chair, the second by giving him clean clothes, and the third by cooking a meal. In gratitude, the next day he shows them a "funny-looking chair", able to fulfill their wishes. The three sisters wish for husbands. The chair grants their wishes, but the third sister's husband, despite being handsome, is always wearing a long white coat made of bearskin (thus, his appellation). They live together and she gives birth to three children. One day, however, a witch enchants White-Bear Whittington with a song and spells, and takes him. The third sister becomes despondent. She is then visited by the same old man, who gives her a gold ring, a gold bracelet, and a gold comb, and tells her to traverse the Red Sea and climb up the cliff on fire to reach the witch's castle. She does as advised and arrives at the castle. She uses the golden gifts to bribe the witch for five minutes alone with White-Bear. On the first two nights, he is in a deep sleep brought about by a magic drug, but on the third night, he wakes up and recognizes her. The witch's spell is broken and they return home.

== Other fiction ==
The tale of White Bear Whittington was used in the book Fair and Tender Ladies, by Lee Smith. The story is told to Ivy, the main character, by the Cline sisters.

== See also ==
- The Brown Bear of Norway
- White-Bear-King-Valemon
- Prince Whitebear
