= The Story of the Abandoned Princess =

Norwegian fairy tale published by Camilla Collet

The Story of the Abandoned Princess (Danish: Historien om den forladte Prindsesse; Norwegian: Eventyret om dem forladte prinsesse) is a Norwegian fairy tale published by Norwegian author Camilla Collet. It is related to the cycle of the Animal as Bridegroom and distantly related to the Graeco-Roman myth of Cupid and Psyche, in that the heroine is forced to perform difficult tasks for a witch.

== Summary ==
A king is on a hunt, but loses his way in the forest, and cannot find his way home. He ventures deep into the woods, and suddenly a white bear comes out of the bushes. The king is afraid at first, but the bear begins to talk and assuages him that he means no harm, and promises to help him out of the forest in exchange for the king's youngest daughter. The king agrees to his terms and is carried on the bear's back to his castle. Time passes, and the king hopes the bear has forgotten their deal, until a golden carriage appears on the road to the castle. The king tries to send his elder daughters to the bear, but the carriage does not move, and, he reluctantly, sends the third princess to be with the bear.

While the king and the queen mourn for their daughter, she is taken to a magnificent castle. Despite the luxury, she notices that the castle is devoid of life, and cries, thinking she will never be able to see her family again. That same night, the princess senses someone is in the bedchambers with her; the mysterious guest tells her he means no harm, and that the castle is hers, as long as she obeys and trusts him. They sleep together. The next morning, she wakes up and sees the white bear, and cries again, alone in the castle.

For three years, they live together and she gives birth to two boys and a girl in three consecutive years, but each time, they are taken from her: the elder boy by a dog, the younger boy by a wolf, and the girl by a dragon. Fed up with the increased loneliness and losing her children, she asks the white bear to visit her family. The white bear allows it, but warns her to listen to her father, not her mother. Despite the warning, the princess visits her parents: the king advises her to be patient, while the queen gives her a flint to use at night. The princess returns and, after the third time, decides to light a candle at night to see her husband's face: he is a handsome prince, and a bearskin is folded on the floor near the bed. However, a drop of tallow falls on his chest. The prince wakes up and chastises his wife, saying that, if she waited, his curse would have been lifted, and now he must remain a bear.

The princess pleads with him, and he agrees to take her on his back. They journey together; the princess sees in the distance a faint light like a star, then one shining like the moon, and another bright like the Sun. The bear explains the distant lights are from his sisters' houses. They pass by each of them to get provisions for the road, and the princess finds one of her children in each of them. Finally, they reach a Glass Mountain, which the bear climbs up and leaves his wife there, but an old woman appears and gives the princess a bag with items inside she can use to scale the mountain.

The princess does and arrives at a castle, where she is made to perform tasks for a Hexen: first, she is given a large bag of black wool she must wash white. A strange prince appears to her and offers to fulfill the task for her in exchange for a kiss. The princess refuses, but the man helps her at any rate. Next, the castle's Hexen orders the princess to take a large casket to the Hexen's sister in another farm, which she must not open. The princess walks with the casket along the way, but decides to open it: worms and toads jump out of it and spread to the four directions. The strange prince appears again and offers to help her for a kiss. Despite the girl's refusal, he commands the animals back to the box and gives her a handkerchief and a piece of meat. The princess walks to the farm and uses the handkerchief on a gate that attempts to squash her and the meat for a fierce dog, enters the farm and is served a sausage, which she hides in her clothes to deceive the Hexen's troll sister.

Finally, the Hexen has the princess sit at the table and forces her to hold a candle until it melts on her fingers. The princess begins to cry that her fingers are burning, and the strange prince says he can save her if she calls him her "Hjertenskjer". After some insistence, the princess agrees to his terms, and she recognizes his voice as her husband's. The Hexen bursts in anger, and the prince explains the Hexen cursed him into bear form, but now he is free. The princess and he take the Hexen's treasures, rescue their children and live together in the prince's castle.

== Analysis ==
=== Tale type ===
Norwegian folklorist Ørnulf Hodne classified the tale, in his work The Types of the Norwegian Folktale, as tale type AT 425, Østenfor sol og vestenfor måne ("The Search for the Lost Husband). According to the Norwegian index, the tale is the second oldest variant registered in Norway, originally published in 1844.

The tale is related, in the international Aarne-Thompson-Uther Index, to tale type ATU 425, "The Search for the Lost Husband" and its subtypes, more specifically, to subtype ATU 425B, "Son of the Witch". The tale type involves the heroine being forced to perform tasks for a witch or her mother-in-law, but she is secretly helped by her husband or love interest.

=== Motifs ===
According to Jan-Öjvind Swahn's study on some 1,100 variants of Cupid and Psyche and related types, he concluded that the bear is the "most usual" form of the supernatural husband in Germanic and Slavonic areas.

The motif of the separation of the heroine from her children is located by scholarship across Celtic and Germanic speaking areas.

==== The heroine's tasks ====
Another motif that appears in the tale type is that the heroine must travel to another witch's house and fetch from there a box or casket she must not open. German folklorist Hans-Jörg Uther remarked that these motifs ("the quest for the casket" and the visit to the second witch) are "the essential feature" of the subtype.

Similarly, according to Danish scholar Inger Margrethe Boberg, in Norwegian variants of the tale type, the heroine journeys to Hell to fetch bridal ornaments for the witch's upcoming wedding with the prince, and must hold torches during the ceremony.

== Variants ==
=== Norway ===
In a Norwegian tale collected by Norwegian author Hallvard Bergh in Valdres with the title Kong Hvidevallbjørn or Kong Videvallbjønn ("King Whitevalbear"), a king loses his way in a dark forest when a polar bear appears and demands his youngest daughter as his bride. The king agrees at the moment and returns home. Some time later, the polar bear appears and wants the king to uphold his end of the bargain: for two days, the king deceives the polar bear with daughters of other people. On the third day, the polar bear returns and fetches the girl. She climbs onto his back and they travel far to his castle. The polar bear reveals he was enchanted into that form by an ugly witch who wanted him to marry her daughter. He takes off his bearskin at night to sleep on their bed, and by morning wears the bearskin again. They live like this for three years: the princess gives birth to three children, that the bear takes from her and brings to one of his sisters. After three years, the princess wants to visit her family. The polar bear takes her to his parents-in-law and tells her he will sleep by another room, and that no one must bring any light to see him. The princess tells her mother about the bearskin. That night, the princess lights a lamp to see him more clearly, and three drops of wax fall on his body. The polar bear warns her she shouldn't have done that, since his curse would have been over had she waited some more time, but now he has to return and marry the "Gygerdatter" ("Gyger's daughter"). The prince turns back into a polar bear and takes the princess to visit his sisters and their children. The princess receives from her sisters-in-law three dresses, one bright "like the moon", the other "like the stars", and the third like "the sun". The princess takes her to a Glass Mountain and leaves her there by its foot, while he climbs the slope mountain. The princess cries, but a man takes pity on her and makes her a pair of metal shoes. She tries to climb the Glass Mountain twice and succeeds on the third. She reaches the Gygergaard ("The City of the Gygers") and finds that her husband, now human, is there. The princess works as the Gyger's servant, and must wash a black thing white and grind twelve barrels of malt. A man appears to her - her husband - and demands a kiss for his help. She refuses, but he helps her anyway. On the third day, the princess is sent to Hell to get a nuptial jewel for the Gyger's daughter. The man gives her directions to Hell, some warnings on how to treat the things she meets on the road, and advises her not to eat anything while there, get the jewels and escape. At the end of the tale, the princess uses the three dresses as bargaining chips to be with her husband during the three days of celebration. (Note: This is a motif from a related tale type, ATU 425A. According to German folklorist Hans-Jörg Uther, the main feature of tale type ATU 425A is "bribing the false bride for three nights with the husband". In fact, when he developed his revision of Aarne-Thompson's system, Uther remarked that an "essential" trait of the tale type ATU 425A was the "wife's quest and gifts" and "nights bought".) The princess wakes her husband on the third day and they concoct a plan to get rid of the Gyger and her daughter. The next day, the princess shall hold candles during the ceremony, suffering the pain of their burning on her hands until it consumes her whole body. However, as her husband and the Gyger's daughter enter the bedchambers, the prince asks his bride to trade places with the princess. Thus, the Gyger's daughter burns to death, the princess and her husband flee the castle, get their children and return to her parents. The tale was compared to other Animal Bridegroom variants.

=== Sweden ===
G. A. Åberg collected a variant from Nyland titled Kung Björn ("King Bear"). In this tale, a farmer has three daughters and asks each one what they want for Christmas: the elder wants a dress, the middle one a tablecloth and the third "something heard, but unseen". They hear a knock on the door; the youngest and the middle daughter see nothing; the elder opens the door and a bear takes her to his castle. In the castle, they live like husband and wife, and she bears him three children, that are taken from her as soon as they are born. Eventually, the girl goes back home for a visit and is given a flint by her mother. The girl uses the flint at night and discovers the bear is a man. A spark fall on his face and the man wakes up, saying that the witch who cursed him has regained power over him. The bear takes his wife to visit three huts, where their children are, and tell her that, if she wants to see him a gain in the witch's castle, she must wash her feet before crossing a bridge, wash two dirty mats and set them to dry, open the castle gates very slowly and close them, place a pillow under a sleeping dragon's head, give roast meat to two dogs, and accept - but not eat - the food the witch may serve her. The bear disappears and she goes after him. She reaches the witch's castle and is given a calf's head to eat. While the witch is away, the girl hides the calf's head in her clothes. After the girl leaves the castle, the witch orders the calf's head to harm the heroine, but she throws it away. Seeing that her ploy failed, the witch commands the dogs, the dragon, the mats, the gates and the bridge to stop the girl, but none harm her. The witch then pursues the maiden, but steps on the bridge. The bridge breaks apart and the witch drowns. Her spell is broken, and the bear becomes human.

== See also ==
- White-Bear-King-Valemon
- East of the Sun and West of the Moon
