= The White Hound of the Mountain =

Irish folktale

Folk tale
- Name: The White Hound of the Mountain
- Aarne–Thompson grouping: ATU 425A (The Animal as Bridegroom)
- Country: Ireland
- Region: Mayo
- Published in: Béaloideas

The White Hound of the Mountain (Irish: Cú Bán an tSléiḃe) is an Irish folktale collected in the early 20th century and published in academic journal Béaloideas. It is related to the international cycle of the Animal as Bridegroom or The Search for the Lost Husband, wherein a human maiden marries a man under an animal curse, loses him and has to search for him.

== Sources ==
The tale was originally collected in Belmullet, County Mayo, in 1903, from an informant called Antoine Sirin (Searns) and published in journal Béaloideas.

== Summary ==
A king has a magical wishing chair. His three daughters, the princesses, wish to see for themselves its mystical powers. Each girl sits on the chair and wishes for a husband: the first for the king of the Eastern World, the second for the King of the Western World and the youngest for the titular "White Hound of the Mountain". As they predicted, each of their husbands appear to claim them. The third suitor, however, is not met with the same reception as the others. After three attempts, the White Hound takes the third princess as his intended and goes with her to their new home. The White Hound reveals himself to be a man by night and a hound by day. They live together and she bears him three children. After each birth, the children are taken from them by a mysterious lady. The third princess visits her family and, hounded by her relatives, tells everything about her married life. The White Hound becomes a crow and disappears, and his wife goes after him. The princess visits three houses and obtains a pair of scissors, a comb and a reel for winding yarn. At last she reaches the castle of the Queen of the Black Cloak, the witch who enchanted her husband, and bribes her with the golden objects she received.

== Analysis ==
=== Tale type ===
The tale is classified in the international Aarne-Thompson-Uther Index as type ATU 425A, "The Animal as Bridegroom". in this tale type, the heroine is a human maiden who marries a prince that is cursed to become an animal of some sort. She betrays his trust and he disappears, prompting a quest for him. According to Irish folklorist Dáithí Ó hÓgáin, type 425 is known in Ireland as Cu Ban an tSléibhe ("The White Hound of the Mountain"): the heroine marries a prince cursed to be a hound by day, burns his dogskin and finds him under the power of a witch, with whom she trades three wonderful and magical objects (a comb, scissors and a needle) for three nights with him.

=== Motifs ===
According to Hans-Jörg Uther, the main feature of tale type ATU 425A is "bribing the false bride for three nights with the husband". In fact, when he developed his revision of Aarne-Thompson's system, Uther remarked that an "essential" trait of the tale type ATU 425A was the "wife's quest and gifts" and "nights bought".

According to Jan-Öjvind Swahn's study on some 1,100 variants of Cupid and Psyche and related types, the motif of the "wishing chair" appears in Celtic, Irish and British variants. In the same study, he concluded that the dog as the animal husband appears "confined to the Germanic and Celtic areas".

==== The vanishing of the children ====
The motif of the separation of the heroine from her children is located by scholarship across Celtic and Germanic speaking areas. According to scholar Gerard Murphy, in Irish variants, the children are taken by a "Hand-down-the-chimney", a motif that also appears in the Fenian Cycle.

== Variants ==
=== Ireland ===
==== Cú Bán an t-Sléibhe (Galway) ====
An Irish language variant titled Cú Bán an t-Sléibhe ("The White Hound of the Mountain"; IPA:[kuːbˠaːnˠənˠˈtʲlʲeːvʲə]) was published in the academic journal Zeitschrift für celtische Philologie. In this tale, a king has a wife who dies, but who expressed an order to bar anyone from entering a certain room before she was buried in a year and a day. However, when the king is on a hunt, the princesses enter the room and sit on a chair, which is magical. All three express their wishes for a husband: the elder wishes to marry the King of the East, the middle one with the King of the West, and the youngest to "The White Hound of the Mountain", without knowing if he exists or not. In time, their respective suitors appear to fetch their brides, including the White Hound of the Mountain. The third princess marries the White Hound and she gives birth to three children of wondrous aspect in three consecutive pregnancies: two girls and a boy with a ring on the head, gold in the forehead and silver on their backs. After her labour, she gives the children to a handmaid to look after the baby, but a pair of hands come in through the chimney and vanishes with the baby everytime. After the third time, where she gave birth at her father's house, the elder sisters return home without riches and clothes, and notice the luxury of their cadette, then feel jealous and decide to beat her. The pair take the princess to the forest and beat her, but lightning and thunder roar in the sky, the White Hound appears and beats his sisters-in-law to a pulp, then runs away. The princess goes after him and reaches a house. The White Hound tells his wife to take shelter in a nearby house, where she finds a woman taking care of a girl (the princess's daughter). Before she leaves, the woman gives the princess a comb. This repears twice more, with the princess gaining a pair of scissors and a needle. In the third house, the princess notices the boy is missing an eye, so she takes out an eyeball from her pocket and inserts it in the boy's eye socket. The White Hound appears before her and reveals that his curse is due to the princess not giving birth to their children at his home, then runs away until he enters a mountain. She tries to grab onto his shirt and lets four droplets of blood stain it, then turns into stone. After nine years, the princess is restored to human form and goes to talk to a hunter about White House. The hunter tells the princess his master has married a witch. The witch appears to wash the bloodstained shirt and the princess sees it, then touches the shirt, removing the blood. The princess then asks the witch to spend the night with the White Hound, by trading the objects she gained with the witch (named Cúl-Carrach) and her daughter (named Maol-Charrach) for three nights with him. The witch who cursed him can only be defeated by breaking the egg with her life in it. The tale was translated into German as Der Weisse Hund vom Gebirge ("The White Hound of the Mountain"). Reidar Christiansen identified this variant as hailing from Galway, and also classified the tale as types 425 and 302.

==== Cú Bán an t-Sléibhe 1 ====
In another homonymous variant titled Cú Bán a' tSléiḃe ("The White Hound of the Mountain"), a king has a magical wishing chair (cathaoir a' tsóláis). Each of his three daughters wish for a husband: the elder for a husband more beautiful than the sun, the middle one for one more beautiful than the moon, and the third for the White Hound. In time, all three bridegrooms arrive to get their respective brides, the White Hound taking his through a secret forest path. In their castle, the White Hound asks his wife which form she prefers him to be, and she answers that as a man by night. Some time later, the princess is pregnant with their first child (a son, White Hound prophecises), and is taken to her family's castle to give birth, but with instructions to leave the child outside the gate for the White Hound to take him. The same happens to their second child, but, with the third pregnancy, the White Hound alerts his wife not to return home, since her new step-mother will force her to disclose the princess's married life. Despite the warnings, the princess goes to her father's castle and leaves her third son outside. Inside, the princess's stepmother tortures her with an iron poker, and, to avoid further harm to herself, the princess gives in and tells everything to her perfidious step-mother. The princess awaits for her husband to come, but he does not, so she walks by herself to the White Hound's castle, finding nothing but ruins. She notices three sods and picks them up. When she tosses one, her husband appears with their sons, and flees soon after. The princess runs after him, until she stops to rest by an old woman's hut. Before the princess leaves, the old woman tells her that her family stopped there - her proof a half-bitten sandwich -, and gives her a pair of magic scissors. Her pursuit continues with two next stops, where she gets a comb and a box, until she reaches her father-in-law's castle. For a year and a day, the White Hound (back to human form), lives with his father, and announces he shall marry one that can wash his bloodied shirt. The princess washes it, but the hen-wife's daughter takes the credit for it, and is set to marry the human White Hound. The princess uses the old women's gifts (a scissors that turn cloth to silk, a comb that turns hair golden and the box that spins yarn) to bribe the false bride for three nights with the White Hound. For the first two nights, she cannot wake him up, due to him drinking a sleeping potion, until the third day, where he wakes up and recognizes her.

==== Cú Bán an t-Sléibhe 2 ====
In an homonymous tale collected by Séamus Ó Duilearga in 1962 with the title Cú bhán an tSléibhe ("The White Hound of the Mountain"), a widowed king has three daughters. While he is away, he locks up a magical chair inside a room, which grants wishes to anyone who sits on it. One day, his three daughter decide to test it by wishing for husbands: the elder asks for the most honored man in the world to come that very night to spouse her, and the middle one for the second most honored man. The youngest does not want to sit on the chair, but, persuaded by her elder sisters, sits on it and wishes for the Cú Bhán an TSléibhe ("White Hound of the Mountain") to come and marry her. The next day, the elders' wishes come true, which means that the youngest's will come too. The White Hound of the Mountain appears to claim his bride, but the king tries to trick him by sending a servant's daughter. Twice he falls for it, but realizes the deception and comes back for his true bride the third time. When they arrive at their new home, the White Hound asks his wife which she prefers: that he is a hound by morning or man at night, or the opposite. She chooses the second option, and the White Hound remains an animal by day and human by night. Time passes, and she becomes pregnant, but wishes to give birth at her father's house. The White Hound agrees to her return, but warns her not to cry if anything happens to their children. The princess goes back home and, in three consecutive pregnancies, gives birth to her children, but each time a black figure comes down the chimney and takes the child from her. The princess betrays his trust, he vanishes, and she has to search for him in Tir na Hóige. During her journey, she passes by the houses of three old ladies who are also taking care of her children, and is given a magical object in each. Finally, she reaches Tír na Hóige, where she lives in a pigpen. The lady of the castle, Calleach Bharrach (Old Woman Bharrach) and her daughter Iníon Mhaol Charrach see the wonderful gifts of the princess (a magical pair of scissors, a magical comb and a magical ring), and wish to buy them. The princess agrees to a deal: each time, she offers a magical item for one night with the sleeping White Hound of the Mountain, who has remained in human form. The princess cannot wake him up on the first two nights, but manages to wake him up on the third. The White Hound wakes up and reunites with his true wife, and tells her they have to destroy the external soul of the witches, hidden in a duck's egg that is hidden in a duck, hidden in a sheep's belly, hidden in a boar.

==== The White Dog of the Valley ====
In an Irish tale collected from an informant named Nóra Ní Shuilleabháin, from Garrane, County Kerry, with the title The White Dog of the Valley, a king and queen live in Gleannscoheen and have a daughter. A prince, born in the same month as her, is cursed by a witch and convinced to steal the king's cattle. It happens thus, the king discovers the dog stealing his cattle. The dog asks for the princess as his bride, but the queen dresses the goose-girl to trick him. The prince comes to fetch his bride, discovers the ruse, and return to steal his cattle. The king relents and gives him the princess. Both go to live in the prince's underground mansion. In time, the princess gives birth to three sons, who are taken from her by a giant dog. On the first time, she is mending a shirt and accidentally prickles her finger with a needle, and three blood drops fall on the prince's shirt. After a while, the princess says she will go home, and meets a blacksmith who offers to help her. She tells him her story, and the blacksmith points her to three houses where she can find her children, and at last a woman washing a shirt. The princess passes by the houses of three women where she does find her sons, and from each house she gains a gift: a magic comb in the first one, a reel that produces infinite thread in the second one, and finally a thimble that protects the finger in the third. Finally, she reaches a place where a woman is washing a shirt because the witch ordered her to. The princess washes the stained shirt and is taken by the woman to her house. Some time later, the witch's daughter pays a visit to the girl and finds the princess with the gifts, then tells her mother she wants them. The witch demands the objects, but the princess makes a deal: the objects for three nights with the witch's husband. The witch accepts, and the princess trades the comb, the reel and the thimble, then goes to the witch's husband's quarters. The princess recognizes it is her husband, the prince, and tries to talk to him for the first two nights, failing to do so, for the prince drank a sleeping draught. A male servant gives the prince a drink for the third day, but the prince drops it. The princess talks to her husband on the third night, and the male servant gives them a pair of hawk's eggs. The prince and the princess escape on ponies, but the witch and her daughter fly behind them transformed into hawks. The servant boy throws the eggs at each of them, killing the pair. The couple retrieve their children and return home.

==== The Black Woolly Dog ====
In an Irish tale collected from an informant named William O' Donnell, from Coollegrean, County Kerry, with the title The Black Woolly Dog, a gentleman has a daughter and a wishing chair his cadette looks after. The girl's elder sisters wish for gentlemen, while the youngest's wish brings her a black woolly dog as her suitor. After a year, the girl returns with the black woolly dog escorting her carriage, bringing their first child with them. The girl's mother goes to check on her daughter and her son-in-law, and finds a handsome youth in place of the dog, and a cap beside him. The girl's mother wants to burn the cap, but the youth advises her not to do it. The dog and the girl return the following year with two children in tow, and in the year after with three children in tow. Finally, the girl's mother decides to burn her husband's cap. The youth tells his wife he needs to depart, and the girl declares she will follow him. The girl trails after the black woolly dog and he directs her to a house which she can take lodge by invoking the name of the black woolly dog. In the first house, she finds a child she recognizes as her son, and the woman gives her a magic object that provides food and drinks. The same event happens in a second house, where she finds another of her children and a woman that gives her a magic pair of scissors that can cut any dress into silk, and in a third house, where she finds her third child and a woman gives her a magic comb. Eventually, she gets hold of him and pulls up his hair, which causes some a drop of blood to fall on his shirt. He loses her by entering the ground, while she take shelter up a tree. A blacksmith's maidservant appears to fetch water from a well near the tree and mistakes the girl's reflection for her own. So does the blacksmith's wife when she goes to the well, until the blacksmith himself goes to investigate, finds the girl and takes her in. The blacksmith notices the girl's nails are torn off by doing too much digging and makes her iron nails, which she uses to dig up the ground after her husband. The girl excavates until she falls next to a river where a girl is trying to wash her boss's shirt, which only his lawful wife can do. The dog's wife manages to wash it, gives the washergirl a ring and tells her to lie that the ravens brought the lawful wife's arm and tore her face. The washergirl does as instructed and gives lodge to the newcomer. Later, the witch who married the black woolly dog discovers the human girl, his lawful wife, has the articles and wants to buy them, which the girl trades for three nights with the witch's husband, who is the dog in human form. A deal is made, and the dog's lawful wife tries to wake him up for the first two nights, but he was given a dozing drop to fall asleep. On the third day, after he and a boy are fouling, the boy tells the human dog his true wife was there, and the girl and the boy conspire to get rid of the witch: the boy reddens an iron spear and burn the witch's only eye in her sleep. It happens thus; the girl tells the boy to hold the witch, and he kills her. The woolly dog marries the boy to the girl and retakes his wife.

=== Scotland ===
In his collection Popular Tales of the West Highlands, author John Francis Campbell reported in the section "Gaelic list" a Scottish Gaelic tale titled Cu ban an ’t Sleibhe, collected from an informant named Marian Gillies, from Port nan Long, North Uist.

== Legacy ==
The tale was reworked by author Thomas Kiernan in his book The White Dog of the Mountain and other Irish tales.

== See also ==
- The Daughter of the Skies
- The Tale of the Hoodie
- The Three Daughters of King O'Hara
- Sigurd, the King's Son (Icelandic fairy tale)
- The Tale of the Little Dog
