= Habogi =

Icelandic fairy tale

Habogi is an Icelandic fairy tale published in Neuislandische Volksmärchen by linguist Adeline Rittershaus. Andrew Lang included it in The Brown Fairy Book.

== Source ==
Adeline Rittershaus sourced the tale from a female teller named Guðríður Einarsdóttir.

== Synopsis ==
A couple had three daughters, and the youngest was the most beautiful and best tempered. One day, the father asked what names their prospective husbands had. The oldest wanted her husband to have the name Sigmund, which gave her many choices; the second, Sigurd, and there were seven in their own village; the youngest, Helga, at the urging of a voice, said, Habogi, and none of them had ever heard of a man named Habogi. Sigmunds and Sigurds came to woo the older two, and other men the youngest, but none of them were named Habogi. Finally, her sisters married, and a coarse old peasant came, saying he was Habogi and Helga must marry him. Helga agreed.

When her sisters' wedding was over, he brought her a beautiful horse, with a saddle of red and gold, and said she must see where she would live once she married him. They rode off, and he showed her a great meadow, with a large herd of sheep that were his, but the finest one, with golden bells on its horns, was to be hers. They rode on, to a fine herd of cow, but the finest one was to be hers; and then a herd of horses, and whichever one she chose was to be hers.

He brought her to a little, tumble-down house, which did not seem fitting for a man with such herds, but she said nothing. He took her within, and it was marvelously furnished. Because he had to prepare for the wedding, he had his foster brother take her home. On the third day, she brought her sisters and parents. Her sisters were jealous when they saw the flocks. They were heartened by the little house, but once within, their jealousy returned. They tried to mar her wedding gown, which was finer than theirs had been with ashes, but Habogi prevented the ashes from staining it, and fixed the two sisters where they stood, so that everyone mocked them.

The next morning, the house was a palace, and a handsome young man was there, and Helga told her sisters that the man was her Habogi.

== Analysis ==
Folklorist D. L. Ashliman grouped the tale under type ATU 444*, "Enchanted Princes", a miscellaneous tale type of the Aarne-Thompson-Uther Index. Another tale of this type is Hermod and Hadvor.

In her commentaries, Adeline Rittershaus surmises that the tale seemed incomplete, since the narrative does not tell if Habogi was an enchanted prince himself, or disguises as an old man to test his bride.

== See also ==
- The Brown Bear of Norway
