= White-Bear-King-Valemon =

Norwegian fairy tale

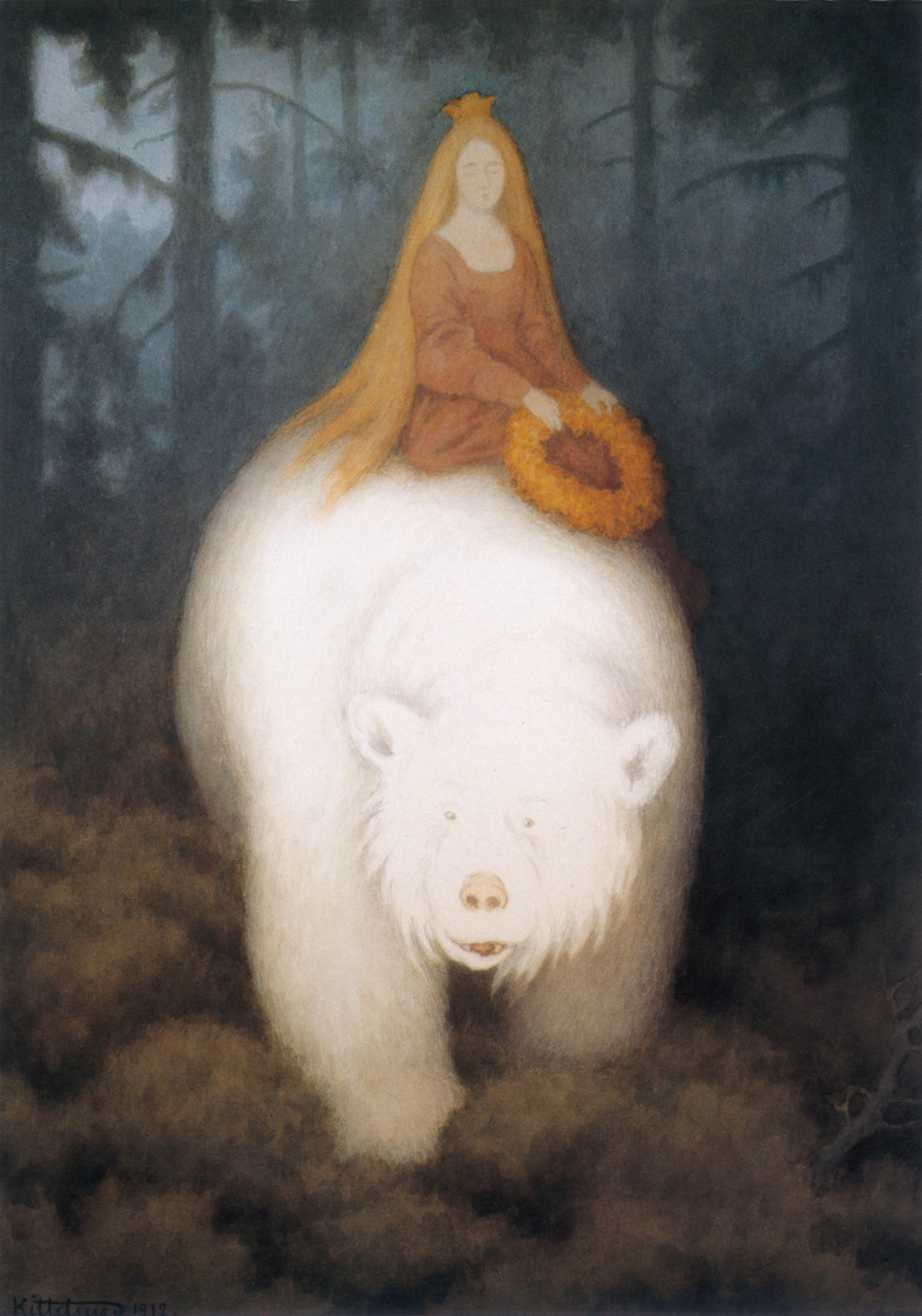
- White-Bear King Valemon by Theodor Kittelsen.

Folk tale
- Name: White-Bear-King-Valemon
- Also known as: Kvitebjørn kong Valemon
- Aarne–Thompson grouping: ATU 425A, The Animal (Monster) as Bridegroom
- Region: Norway
- Published in: Norske folkeeventyr, by Peter Christen Asbjørnsen and Jørgen Moe
- Related: East of the Sun and West of the Moon (ATU 425A); Cupid and Psyche (ATU 425B); Beauty and the Beast (ATU 425C)

White-Bear-King-Valemon (Norwegian: Kvitebjørn kong Valemon) is a Norwegian fairy-tale. The tale was published as No. 90 in Asbjørnsen and Moe's Norske Folke-Eventyr. Ny Samling (1871). George Webbe Dasent translated it for his Tales from the Fjeld.

The familiar version was collected by the artist August Schneider in 1870 from Setesdal. Jørgen Moe collected a variant of the tale from Bygland Municipality, summarized in the 2nd edition of Norske Folke-Eventyr (1852).

It is Aarne-Thompson type 425A, "The Animal (Monster) as Bridegroom". A similar Norwegian tale that exhibits this motif is East of the Sun and West of the Moon (Asbjørnsen & Moe, No. 41). Others of this type include: The Brown Bear of Norway, The Daughter of the Skies, The Enchanted Pig, The Tale of the Hoodie, Master Semolina, The Enchanted Snake, The Sprig of Rosemary, and The Black Bull of Norroway.

== Synopsis ==
A king had two ugly and mean daughters and one, the youngest, who was beautiful and gentle. She dreamed of a golden wreath. Her father set goldsmiths to make it, but none of them matched her dream. Then she saw a white bear in the woods and it had the wreath. The bear would not give it to her before she agreed to go away with him, and got three days to prepare for the trip. The daughter did not care for anything as long as she had the wreath, and her father was glad of her happiness and thought he could keep off the bear, but when it arrived, it attacked the king's army and defeated them, unscathed.

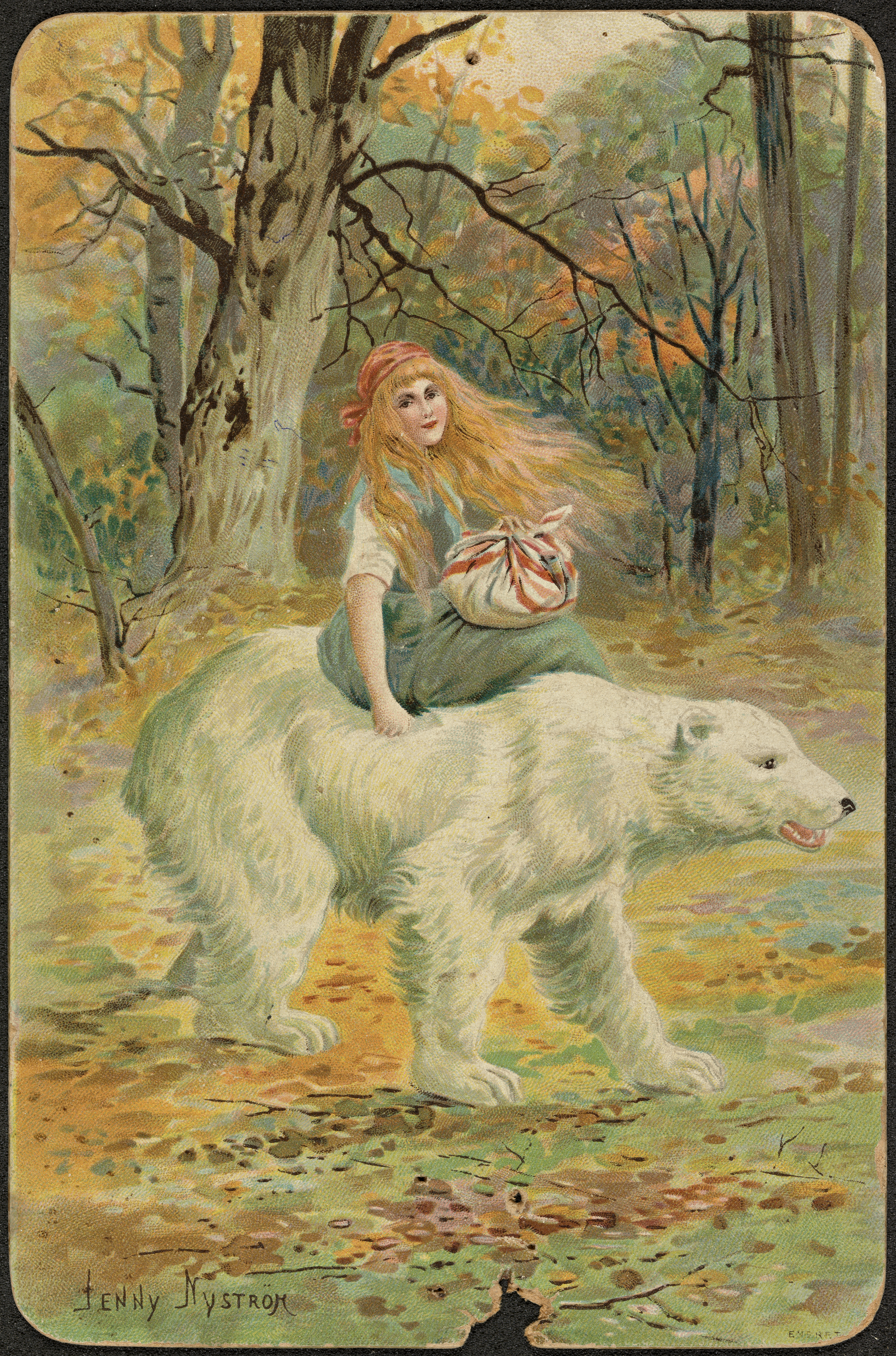
An illustration by Jenny Nyström

The king sent out his oldest daughter. The bear took her on its back and rushed off with her, but asked her if she had ever sat softer or seen clearer, and she said she had, on her mother's lap, and at her father's court; so the white bear brought her back to the castle.

The next Thursday it came again, and the king tried his second daughter, and she also failed. The third Thursday, the king had sent his third daughter, and she had never sat softer or seen clearer, so it took her to its castle. Every night, it turned into a man and came to her bed in the dark.

Every year, the princess had a child, but as soon as the baby was born, the bear rushed away with it. At the end of three years, she asked to visit her parents. There, her mother gave her a candle so that she could see him. At night, she lit it and looked at him, and a drop of tallow fell on his forehead, waking him. He told her that if she had waited another month, he would have been free of an evil witch queen's spell, but now he must go to the witch's realm and become her husband. He rushed off, but she seized his fur and rode him, though the branches battered her, until she was so tired that she fell off.

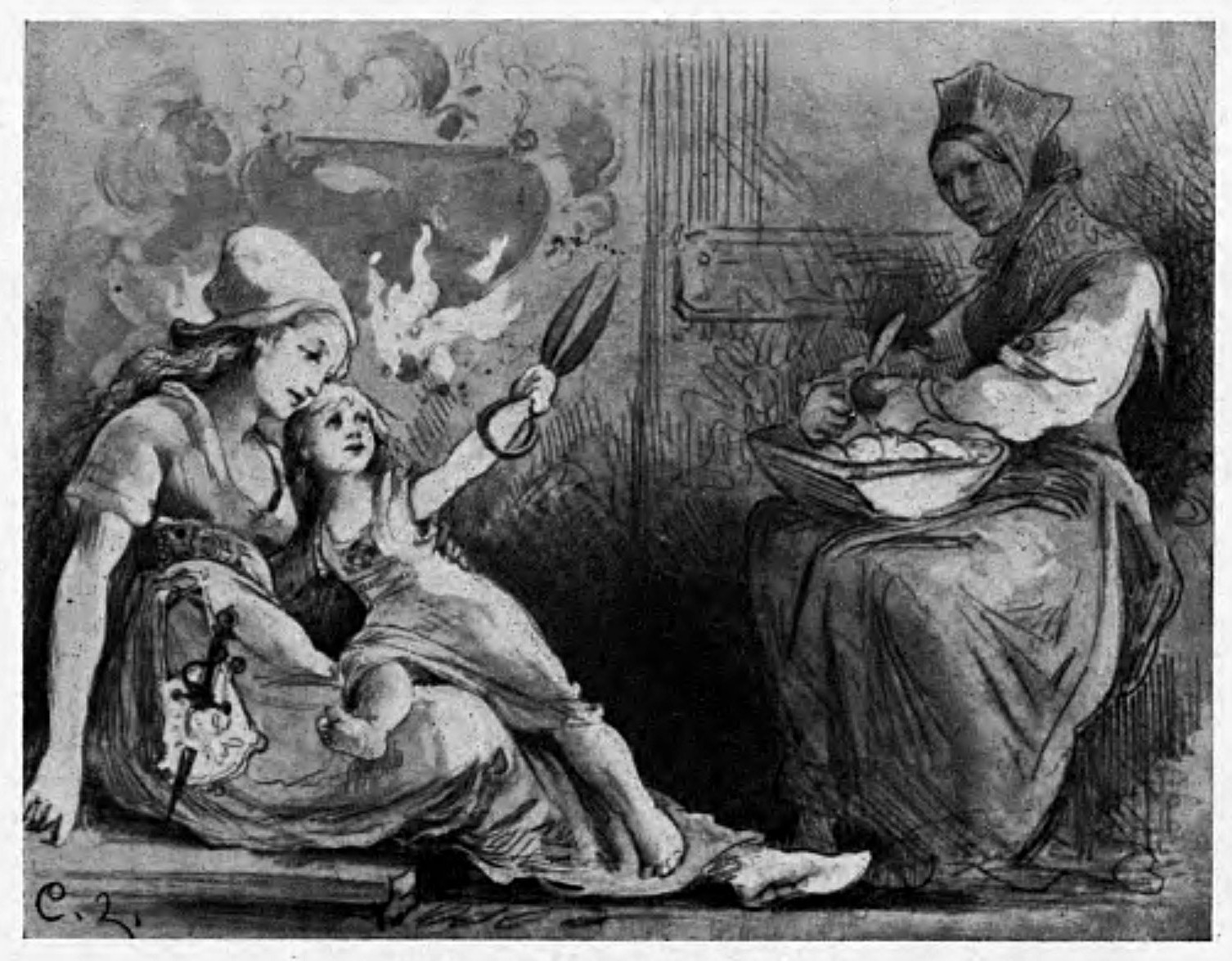
An illustration by Carl Larsson

The princess searched in a forest until she came to a cottage where an old woman and a little girl were. The old woman told her that the bear had gone by; the little girl had a scissors that, whenever she cut in the air, silk and velvet appeared, but she said the woman had more need of it, and gave it to her. She went on to another hut, with another old woman and little girl. This time, the little girl gave her a flask that poured whatever was wished for and never emptied. She went on to a third hut, where the little girl gave her a cloth that could conjure up food. The fourth night, the princess came to a hut where an old woman had many children who cried for food and had no clothing. The princess fed and clothed them, so the old woman had her husband, a smith, make her iron claws so she could climb the mountainside to the witch's country.

The princess reached the witch's castle. She started to clip out cloth. The witch offered to trade for them; the princess insisted on a night with her sweetheart, but the witch agreed but drugged him with a sleeping potion, so that she could not wake him. The next day, she bribed her way in with the flask; again the witch had put him to sleep, but an artisan next door heard her and told the king. The third day, she bribed her way in with the cloth, and the king had not drunk the drink, and they could talk. They come up with an idea how to kill the witch.

And so the day arrived when the king was to marry the witch, and witches from various lands came there for this occasion. But the king had carpenters put a hidden trapdoor in a bridge over a deep chasm where the wedding procession would ride, and so the witch-bride fell through it along with all of her bridesmaids. With the forces of evil destroyed, and the curse broken, the king and the princess took the treasures from the witch's castle and then went to his homeland for the real wedding. On the way, they took the little girls, and the princess learned that they were her own daughters, whom the king had taken so they could aid her in her quest.

== Publication ==
Author Ruth Manning-Sanders adapted the tale in her work A Book of Magical Beasts with the title The White Bear. The tale was also translated to Faroese with the title Bjørnin Valimann kongur ("Bear-Valimann King").

== Analysis ==
=== Tale type ===
The tale is classified as tale type ATU 425, Østenfor sol og vestenfor måne ("The Search for the Lost Husband"), of Ørnulf Hodne's The Types of the Norwegian Folktale. It is also classified in the international Aarne-Thompson-Uther Index as type ATU 425A, "The Animal as Bridegroom". in this tale type, the heroine is a human maiden who marries a prince that is cursed to become an animal of some sort. She betrays his trust and he disappears, prompting a quest for him.

=== Motifs ===
==== The heroine's journey ====
According to Hans-Jörg Uther, the main feature of tale type ATU 425A is "bribing the false bride for three nights with the husband". In fact, when he developed his revision of Aarne-Thompson's system, Uther remarked that an "essential" trait of the tale type ATU 425A was the "wife's quest and gifts" and "nights bought". In stories from Europe, mostly, the heroine's helpers may be three old crones, or her husband's relatives.

==== Other motifs ====
According to Jan-Öjvind Swahn's study on some 1,100 variants of Cupid and Psyche and related types, he concluded that the bear is the "most usual" form of the supernatural husband in Germanic and Slavonic areas.

In some tales, before the separation from her supernatural husband, the wife's children are taken from her and hidden elsewhere. Scholarship locates this motif across Celtic and Germanic speaking areas.

== Variants ==
=== Norway ===
==== Whitebear King Valemon (Aseral) ====
In a Norwegian tale translated to German as Weißbär König Valemon ("Whitebear King Valemon"), a king has three daughters, the third and youngest the most beautiful. One day, the girl has a dream about a beautiful wreath which she wants to have, but the king cannot find the right one for her. One day, some people tell him a bear was seen carrying a golden wreath that could match the princess's dream one, and the animal was in another farm. The king goes to talk to the bear and request the wreath, which he agrees to give in exchange for the princess's hand in marriage. A deal is made, but the king wants to kill the bear as soon as he appears near the castle. He tries to shoot the bear, but the animal is unscathed. The king tries to renege on his vow by sending the elder sisters in place of the cadette, but the bear discovers the ruse when he asks each girl if she ever sat on anything more comfortable and if she ever saw more clearly: the real bride answers her mother's lap was more comfortable and the skies clearer. The bear takes the princess to a hut, where they live like husband and wife, the bear living as such during the day and coming to her bed at night. The girl bears three children to the bear, who takes them from her as soon as they are born and placed elsewhere. After the third children goes missing, the princess wants to visit her parents, to which the bear agrees, but warns her to only listen to her father, not to her mother, lest misfortune strikes them. At her parents' house, the queen tells her daughter to use a light source to see her husband, but the king warns her against it. Still, the princess does as her mother instructed and finds a handsome man beside her at night. Three drops of wax fall on his body and he wakes up with a startle, saying that in a few more years he could have gotten rid of the bearskin. Thus, he takes her on another journey, passing by three mansions where the bear asks the princess to request an ox for King Valemon (the bear's name). Valemon also tells his wife not to see the child at the mansion, but she can take whatever the infant offers her. In each mansion, the princess finds a little girl and is given a magic tablecloth in the first one, a musical object in the second, and in the third mansion a pair of scissors. In the third mansion, the princess places the little girl on her lap, but by doing so the bear vanishes. The princess realizes her mistake and wanders off, starving. She then remembers the objects the little girls gave her: the tablecloth provides her with food and drinks, the musical object produces music to lift her spirits, and the scissors can magically generate clothes. The princess then reaches another hut where a couple is living in poor conditions; she then uses the miraculous objects to produce food for them, calm their children and provide better clothes for them. The woman's husband, a blacksmith, in gratitude, says he can fashion a pair of steel claws she can use to climb a steep rock. It happens thus and the princess reaches a castle atop the rock, where a troll witch is trying to wash a shirt with three spots of candlewax. The princess offers to wash the shirt, in exchange for spending three nights with the witch's husband. A deal is made, but the witch gives a soporific drink to the husband, who is King Valemon. For two nights, the princess cannot wake her husband. On the third night, King Valemon is told about the person who comes at night, so he pretends to be asleep, even unflinching when the troll witch prickles his body with a needle. On the last night, King Valemon wakes up and talks to his wife, while the troll witch, defeated, explodes in anger. King Valemon brings their children to the castle and they live in happiness there. The tale was originally collected by folklorist Knut Liestøl in 1909 from an informant named Marit Ljosland, from Åseral Municipality.

==== Whitebear King Valamon (Saltdal) ====
In a Norwegian tale titled Kvitebjørn kong Valamon ("Whitebear King Valamon"), sourced from Saltdal, a poor man has three daughters. One night, a white bar knocks on the man's door and asks for his cadette as his bride, promising him great riches. The man is not willing to part with his youngest daughter, so he arranges for the white bear to return Thursday evening. The bear returns and the man sends his eldest with the bear, who rides a long distance and asks his would-be bride if she has felt anything more comfortable or seen anything clearer. The maiden answers that her mother's lap was more comfortable and her vision clearer from her father's yard. Knowing he was tricked, the white bear delivers the girl back home, then return son the following Thursday to fetch his bride. Once again, the man sends another in her place, this time his middle daughter, who is asked the same question, but gives the wrong answer. The whitebear returns a third time and asks for the cadette. This time, the man relinquishes his youngest, who accompanies the bear and admits that she has never seen a more comfortable seat. The whitebear takes the maiden to a hut in the forest and lives with her: the maiden stays home, while the bear wanders off during mornings and afternoons, but a man comes to the maiden's bed at night. The maiden bears three children in three consecutive years, but the whitebear takes each of their children and absconds with them to the forest. After the third pregnancy and missing child, the maiden becomes withdrawn and returns to wander around. The whitebear questions her actions, and she replies that her husband finally talked to her. He promises to take her back to her parents' home for a short while, but she has to return with him when he appears to collect her. The whitebear takes his human wife back to her parents and warns her to listen to her father, not to her mother. They arrive, and the maiden is happy to visit her family. On her last day there, her mother pushes her to a corner and asks her what she has been doing all this time with the white bear. The girl answers that she knows not who comes at night, so her mother suspects they must be a troll and gives her a candle made of sebum, for her to light it and see whether her companion is human or a troll. The whitebear returns and takes his wife back home to the forest hut. At night, the man goes to sleep next to her, and the maiden lights up the candle to better take a look at her companion: she finds a handsome youth. She becomes entranced with his face that she accidentally lets three drops of wax fall on his shirt, waking him up. The youth wakes up, admonishes his wife for listening to her mother, since he is an enchanted king's son, but now he has to depart to marry a troll-woman that lives east of the Sun and west of the Moon.

In the morning, the girl finds herself amidst a meadow in the forest with her clothes by her. She thinks of the prince and goes in search of him. She passes by a house where an old woman lives with a young girl that is playing with a ball of golden yarn. The maiden asks if King Valamon, her husband, the white bear, passed by. The old woman replies that he went through the woods, and the boy gives the yarn to the maiden, who continues her journey. She passes by a second house where a second old woman lives with a girl playing with a pair of golden scissors. The little girl gives the maiden the scissors. Lastly, the maiden reaches a third house with an old woman and a little girl with a golden niddy-noddy ("hespetre"). The little girl gives the maiden the niddy-noddy. The maiden finally reaches a large and steep cliff. She tries to climb it, but falls to the ground after a few steps. She meets a blacksmith that lives nearby, tells him her mission, and is given some hooks for her feet so that she can walk up the cliff. She reaches the top of the cliff and finds a splendid gold castle where the trolls live. The trolls ask the stranger how she has come, and the maiden asks if they saw King Valamon, the white bear. The trolls answer that he has just arrived and is sleeping inside the castle, since tomorrow is his wedding. The maiden asks where the quarters of the troll-women are and goes after the troll-bride. However, she is stopped in her tracks. She then goes to the garden and takes out the golden yarn and begins to play with it. The troll-bride wishes to have the yarn, but the maiden trades it for a night in King Valamon's room. The troll-bride agrees, and the maiden tries to wake her husband King Valamon, to no avail, since the troll-bride gave him a sleeping potion. In the morning, the troll-bride expels the maiden. She then takes out the scissors, which she trades for a second night with King Valamon, but he is fast asleep again, like the night before. After the troll-bride expels the maiden a second time. King Valamon wakes up and overhears some troll-guests commenting that they heard crying in the King's room at night. King Valamon notices that someone must have come for him. Back to his wife, she takes out the last golden object, the niddy-noddy, which draws the troll-bride's attention. The maiden trades for a final night in King Valamon's quarters, and enters his room. King Valamon is awake and reunites with his wife. They plan a surprise for the troll-bride: King Valamon's bride should be put to the test and wash the wax drops on his shirt, and whoever does so shall become his bride. King Valamon informs a troll about his test and sends for the troll-bride. She tries to wash the drops of wax, but can only spread it. King Valamon points to the newcomer in the gardens and bids them let her try. His human wife manages to wash his shirt to the trolls' surprise, who, defeated, burst in anger. With the prince released from the spell, he and his wife leave the castle and pass by the houses of the old women. King Valamon recognizes the little girls as their daughters and brings them back with his wife to their palace.

=== Sweden ===
In a Swedish tale titled Prinz Vilius ("Prince Vilius"), a king gets lost in the woods, when a bear appears to help him in exchange for the first thing that greets him when he returns home. Unfortunately for him, it is his daughter that greets him. The white bear, Vilius, comes to take the girl as his wife. The white bear becomes human at night, and remains a bear during the day. They have seven children together and one day the girl wants to visit her family. The girl goes to her father's house and her stepmother convinces her to spy on Vilius at night. She follows her instructions and light a candle to better see him. A drop of wax falls on his body and he wakes up with a startle. Vilius admonishes his wife that he must disappear to a place beyond the Earth and the Sun. The girl goes after him with their seven children, and stops by three old ladies' houses, the first the Mistress of Bears, the second the Mistress of Lions and the third the Mistress of Falcons. The third lady directs her to a castle where Vilius is living with a new wife named Frau Sonne. A falcon takes the girl to the castle. She takes out golden spinning instruments to bribe Frau Sonne for three nights with her husband.

In an archival Finnish-Swedish tale reported by Finnish folklorist Oskar Hackman and collected from Ekenäs, a king loses his way into a dense forest, until a white bear appears to him and offers its help, in exchange for the king's youngest daughter. The king returns to his castle and tries to worm his way out of the white bear's deal by delivering another girl in his daughter's place. The white bear notices the deception twice and gets the princess as his bride. The princess lives in the bear's castle, where he comes at night in human shape, but she cannot see his true form. She gives birth to three children in the next three years, and one day, missing home, wants to visit her family. The white bear lets her leave to visit her family, but warns her against listening to her mother's advice. The princess talks to her mother about the mysterious bedmate, and is given a candle and a box of matches. The princess returns home and, on the same night, lights the candle to see her husband. The man awakes and reveals that he is a prince cursed by a witch to be a bear for scorning her daughter's advances, and now they have to part. The prince turns back into a bear and takes the children with him. The princess follows after him and visits three farms. At each farm, she is gifted a golden härvel (tool for spinning yarn), a golden ball and three golden apples. She eventually reaches the foot of a steep mountain, but cannot climb it. She is hired by a blacksmith who fashions her some climbing equipment. She finally climbs the mountain and enter the troll queen's castle. The troll queen forces the princess to perform chores for her: first, to get a coal from the cellar and put it back; second, to wash a grey calfskin white. The princess's husband, in human form, helps her in both tasks, and advises her not to eat any food the troll queen serves her. The princess goes to dinner with the troll queen, but hides the food in her bosom to trick the troll queen. Finally, the troll queen orders the princess to visit another witch's house. Her husband advises her to grease a creaking bridge, give bread to two dogs and gloves to two men that are threshing grain, and oil a door. The princess follows his instructions and visits the second witch. The second witch orders the door, the men, the dogs and bridge to destroy her, but the princess escapes. Some time later, the princess uses the golden härvel, the golden ball and the three golden apples to bribe the troll queen's daughter for three nights with her husband.

== In media ==
- The film The Polar Bear King (Kvitebjørn Kong Valemon) is based on this fairy tale.
- Similar elements to this story appear in 2 episodes of The StoryTeller episodes "Hans My Hedgehog" which involve a princess marrying an enchanted man who removes his animal form at night and also in "The True Bride" where exchanges for a night with a missing prince are met with a sleeping potion prompting prisoners to inform the prince of the weeping of the True Bride each night.
- Valemon is a character in Cinderella: From Fabletown with Love, and a portion of the comic is set in his kingdom.
- Jessica Day George's novel Sun and Moon, Ice and Snow (based on East of the Sun and West of the Moon) references White-Bear-King-Valemon; when an enchanted bear requests the woodcutter's youngest daughter to live with him in a palace for one year, the woodcutter's wife recalls the story of King Valemon.
- The main illustration became, in black-and-white form, the logo of the publisher Norsk Folkeminnelag.

== See also ==
- Beauty and the Beast
- Eros and Psyche
- The Two Kings' Children
- Whitebear Whittington
- The Story of the Abandoned Princess
- Prince Whitebear

== Bibliography ==
- Asbjørnsen, Peter Christen; Moe, Jørgen, eds. (1871). "90.Hvidebjørn Kong Valemon". Norske folke-eventyr: ny samling. Christiania: Jackob Dybwad i Komm. pp. 154–162.
  - Projekt Runeberg edition, Kvitebjørn kong Valemon, Kvitebjørn kong Valemon Archived 2023-12-12 at the Wayback Machine
- Asbjørnsen, Peter Christen; Moe, Jørgen, eds. (1852). Norske folke-eventyr (2 ed.). Christiania: Johan Dahl. pp. 466–467. (variant)
- Dasent, G. W. (tr.), ed. (1874). "King Valemon, the White Bear". Tales from the Fjeld: A Second Series of Popular Tales. Asbjørnsen&Moe. Chapman & Hall. pp. 353–363.
- Asbjørnsen, Peter Christen, Jørgen Moe, Pat Shaw, and Carl Norman. “White-Bear-King-Valemon”. In: Merveilles & Contes 3, no. 1 (1989): 115–20. http://www.jstor.org/stable/41389996.
- Erik Henning Edvardsen: Kvitebjørn kong Valemon 1. Gerhard August Schneider - arkitekten bak norske evnetyrillustrasjoner. Norsk Folkeminnelags skrifter nr. 155. Aschehoug. ISBN 82-03-19015-4. Oslo 2005.
- Erik Henning Edvardsen: Kvitebjørn kong Valemon 2. Gerhard August Schneider - den illustrerte eventyrutgaven som aldri utkom. Norsk Folkeminnelags skrifter nr. 157. Aschehoug. ISBN 978-82-03-19197-8. Oslo 2007.
