= The Brown Bear of Norway =

Irish fairy tale

Folk tale
- Name: The Brown Bear of Norway
- Aarne–Thompson grouping: ATU 425A (The Animal as Bridegroom)
- Country: Ireland
- Origin Date: 1866
- Published in: Legendary Fictions of the Irish Celts

The Brown Bear of Norway is an Irish fairy tale collected by Patrick Kennedy which appeared in his Legendary Fictions of the Irish Celts (1866). It was later included by Andrew Lang in his anthology The Lilac Fairy Book (1910), though Lang misattributed his source as West Highland Tales (cf. The Brown Bear of the Green Glen).

Others tales of this type include The Black Bull of Norroway, The Daughter of the Skies, East of the Sun and West of the Moon, The Enchanted Pig, The Tale of the Hoodie, Master Semolina, The Sprig of Rosemary, and White-Bear-King-Valemon.

== Synopsis ==
A king in Ireland asked his daughters whom they wanted to marry. The oldest wanted the king of Ulster, the second the king of Munster, and the youngest the Brown Bear of Norway. That night, the youngest princess woke to find herself in a grand hall, and a handsome prince on his knees before her, asking her to marry him. They were married at once, and the prince explained that a witch had transformed him into a bear to get him to marry her daughter. Now that she had married him, he would be freed if she endured five years of trials.

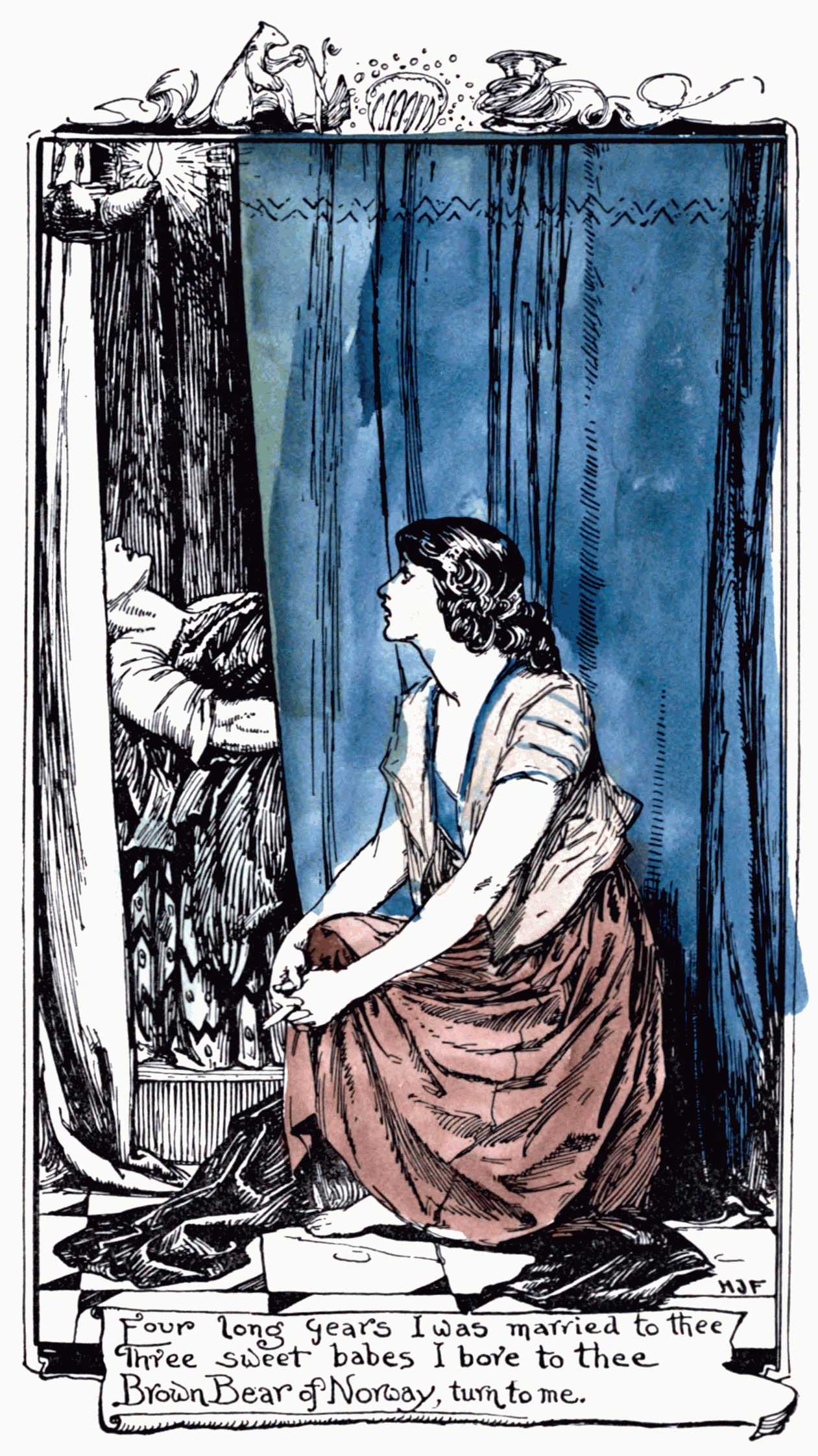

They had three children in succession, but an eagle, a greyhound, and a lady took each one, and the princess, after losing the last child, told her husband that she wanted to visit her family. He told her that to return, she had only to wish it while lying down at night, and the next morning, she would wake in her old bed. She told her family her tale, and while she did not want to lose any more children, she was certain it was not her husband's fault, and she missed him. A woman told her to burn his bear fur, and then he would have to be a man both night and day. She stopped drinking a drink he gave her before she went to bed, and woke up and burned his fur. The man woke and told her that now he had to marry a witch's daughter; it had been the witch who had given her that advice.

The princess chased after her husband, and just as the night fell, they both reached a little house. A little boy played before the hearth, and her husband told her that the boy was their son, and the woman whose house it was, was the eagle who had carried the boy away. The woman made them welcome, and her husband gave her a pair of scissors, that would turn anything they cut into silk. He told her he would forget her during the day, but remember at night. At the second night, they found a house with their daughter, and he gave her a comb that would make pearls and diamonds fall from her hair.

At the third night, they found a house with their third child, and he gave her a hand-reel with golden thread that has no end, and half their wedding ring. He told her that once he entered a wood the next day, he would forget her and the children utterly, unless she reached his home and put her half of the ring to his. The wood tried to keep her out, but she commanded it, by the gifts she bore, to let her in, and found a great house and a woodman's cottage nearby. She went to the cottage and persuaded the woodman and his wife to take her as their servant, saying she would take no wages, but give them silk, diamonds, pearls, and golden thread whenever they wanted. She heard that a prince had come to live at the witch's castle.

The servants at the castle annoyed her with their attentions. She invited the head footman, the most persistent, and asked him to pick her some honeysuckle; when he did, she used the gifts she bore to give him horns and make him sing back to the great house. His fellow servants made mock of him until she let the charm drop. The prince, having heard of this, went to look at her and was puzzled by the sight. The witch's daughter came and saw the scissors, and the princess would only exchange them for a night outside the prince's chamber. She took the night and could not wake the prince, and the head footman ridiculed her as he put her out again. She tried again, with the comb, to no better success.

The third day, the prince did not merely look at her but stopped to ask if he could do anything for her, and she asked if he heard anything in the night. He said he had thought he heard singing in his dreams. She asked him if he had drunk anything before he slept, and when he said he had, she asked him to not drink it. That night, bargained for with the reel, she sang, and the prince roused. The princess was able to put the half-rings together, and he regained his memory. The castle fell apart, and the witch and her daughter vanished. The prince and the princess soon regained their children and set out for their own castle.

== Analysis ==
=== Tale type ===
The tale is classified in the international Aarne-Thompson-Uther Index as type ATU 425A, "The Animal as Bridegroom". in this tale type, the heroine is a human maiden who marries a prince that is cursed to become an animal of some sort. She betrays his trust and he disappears, prompting a quest for him.

However, Swedish scholar Jan-Öjvind Swahn considered that the tale was "greatly mixed" between his type 425B and international type AaTh 425N, "Bird Husband". (Note: For clarification: Swahn's type B corresponds to type ATU 425A of the international index: heroine journeys far and wide and gains objects to bribe the false bride.)

=== Motifs ===
The motif of the separation of the heroine from her children is located by scholarship across Celtic and Germanic speaking areas.

According to Jan-Öjvind Swahn's study on some 1,100 variants of Cupid and Psyche and related types, he concluded that the bear is the "most usual" form of the supernatural husband in Germanic and Slavonic areas.

According to Hans-Jörg Uther, the main feature of tale type ATU 425A is "bribing the false bride for three nights with the husband". In fact, when he developed his revision of Aarne-Thompson's system, Uther remarked that an "essential" trait of the tale type ATU 425A was the "wife's quest and gifts" and "nights bought".

=== Origins ===
Historian Alexander Bugge remarked on the great similarity between the Irish tale and Norwegian East of the Sun and West of the Moon, and suggested that the tale migrated from Norway via Hebrides to Ireland and Scotland, due to references to "Norway" in the stories. According to him, this direction would explain the substitution of the bear in the Irish text for the bull in Scotland.

== Variants ==
=== Germany ===
In a variant from Franconia, collected by Ludwig Bechstein, Die Knaben mit den goldnen Sternlein ("The Boys with the Golden Stars"), a young count overhears three girls talking, the third promising to marry the count and bear him two children with golden stars on their chests (tale type ATU 707, The Three Golden Children). The count marries the girl and she bears the children. His mother casts the children in the water, but a servant rescues them. The wife is accused of giving birth to cats and is expelled from home. The servant gives back her children and they live in solitude. Years later, she decides to seek her husband out, in Portugal. She takes her children to a castle, whose lady asks for one of her children and in return gives her a golden spinning wheel. The same thing happens in a second castle: she gives up one of her children and receives another golden trinket. She uses both to buy two nights with her husband in Portugal.

=== Portugal ===
In a Portuguese tale published by author Ana de Castro Osório with the title História maravilhosa do Príncipe Urso Doce de Laranja ("The Wonderful Tale of the Prince Bear Orange Sweet"), the heroine's father looks for a twig as a present for her, and the enchanted husband is a bear who demands the heroine. They marry and have three daughters, Faith, Hope and Charity. The heroine burns the bearskin and she has to seek him with iron shoes. She visits the houses of the Sun, the Moon and the Wind, whose mothers give her an almond, a chestnut and a pomegranate in exchange for each of her daughters. She finds her husband after 20 years, washes a bloodied shirt and cracks open the almond, the chestnut and the pomegranate to produce musical instruments to trade for three nights with her husband. Scholar Isabel Cárdigos sourced the tale from Algarve.

=== America ===
In a variant from Schoharie, New York, Wolf of the Greenwood, a woman has three daughters and a "witch chair" to charm possible suitors for her daughters. One man sits on the chair and chooses the youngest. They marry. However, a witch who lives in a castle atop a mountain curses the man into a wolf form during the day. The couple has three children, but a dog sent by the witch takes the children to the husband's brothers, whom the witch cursed not to remember their familial ties to the maiden. The wife visits her brothers-in-law: two give her a magical accordion and a comb; the third advises her to ask a blacksmith to fashion a pair of iron shoes to climb the mountain. She does and meets her husband, who acts as the witch's woodsman, and the witch herself.

== See also ==
- Habogi
- Nix Nought Nothing
- The Master Maid
- The Three Daughters of King O'Hara
- The Three Princesses of Whiteland
- The White Hound of the Mountain
- Feather O' My Wing (Irish fairy tale)
