= Marie Hassenpflug =

German fairytale teller

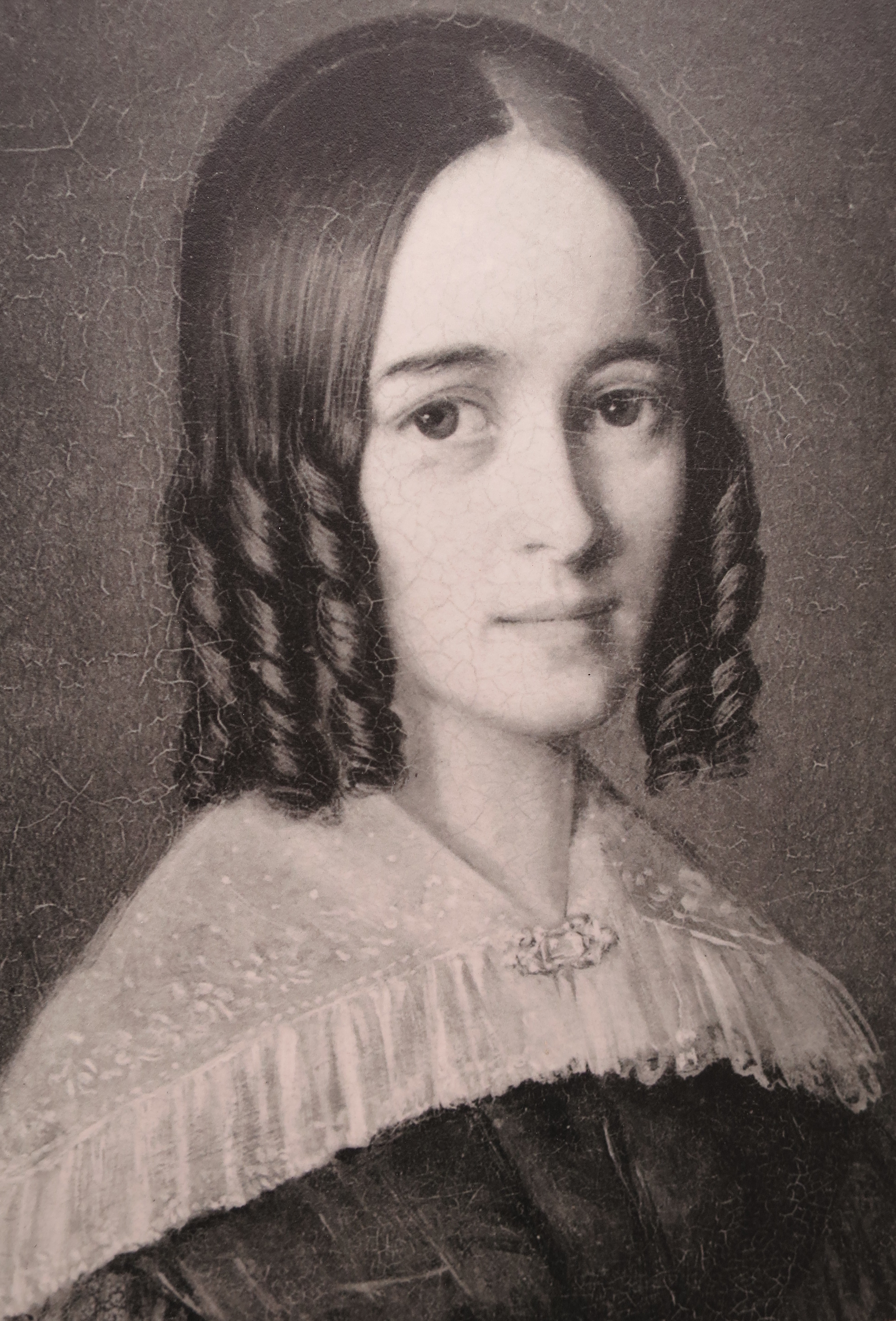
- Born: Marie Magdalene Elisabeth Hassenpflug; 27 December 1788; Altenhaßlau, Landgrafschaft Hessen-Darmstadt
- Died: 21 November 1856 (aged 67); Kassel, Kurfürstentum Hessen
- Known for: Writer
- Spouse: Friedrich von Dalwigk zu Schauenburg

Marie Magdalene Elisabeth Hassenpflug (27 December 1788 – 21 November 1856) was a German storyteller whose presumed versions of various folk tales were an important source for the collection of tales by the Brothers Grimm. She is best known for her versions of "Little Red Riding Hood" (Rotkäppchen), "Sleeping Beauty" (Dornröschen), and "Snow White" (Sneewittchen).

== Life ==
Marie Magdalene Elisabeth Hassenpflug was born in the Ortsteil Altenhaßlau of Linsengericht district in Landgrafschaft Hessen-Darmstadt, Imperial State of Holy Roman Empire on 27 December 1788. Her father Johannes Hassenpflug (1755–1834) had been married since 1788 to Marie Magdalena Dresen (1767–1840), who came from a Huguenot family living in Hanau.

On 14 October 1789, the family moved into a house called Haus Lossow at the marketplace's corner of Lindenstraße in Neustadt, when her father was appointed the Schultheiß of Neustadt-Hanau. She grew up in that house, where the family lived until 1799. She had a brother, Hans Ludwig Alexander, as well as two sisters, Jeanette and Amalie.

She was sickly when young, and one scholar, Heinz Rölleke, surmises that frequent bouts of being bedridden may have made her more receptive to fairy tales. Through another family, the Engelhards, she became friends with the Grimm family. Her brother Ludwig married Charlotte Grimm, the younger sister of the Brothers Grimm.

On 15 April 1799, the Hassenpflug family moved to Kassel, where her father transferred to the post of advocatus fisci (financial supervisor) of the Landgrafschaft Hessen-Kassel.

On 21 August 1814, Marie Hassenpflug married Friedrich von Dalwigk zu Schauenburg, who was stationed in Hanau as a captain of the Kurprinz regiment. They lived on her husband's estate in Hoof (today part of Schauenburg) and in Hanau, where their son, Ludwig Alexander, was born on 24 January 1817.

From 1819 to 1824, she served as a court lady to Herzogin Marie Friederike von Anhalt-Bernburg, a daughter of the Landgraf and later Kurfürst Wilhelm IX/I of Hesse-Kassel. When her husband was the chamberlain of the duchess, they lived in the Hanau City Palace. She died in Kassel on 21 November 1856.

== Literary significance ==
Hassenpflug likely told a series of fairy tales that the Grimm brothers adapted for their children's and household fairy tales (Kinder- und Hausmärchen, KHM): Little Brother and Sister (KHM 11), Little Red Riding Hood (KHM 26), The Girl Without Hands (KHM 31), The Robber Groom (KHM 40), Daumerling's Wanderings (KHM 45), Sleeping Beauty (KHM 50), The Water Mermaid (KHM 79), The Golden Key (KHM 200), Phoenix Bird (KHM 75a), The Blacksmith and the Devil (KHM 81a), Der Froschprinz (KHM 99a), the text fragment with the louse, and possibly Snow White (KHM 53).

In an essay published in 1986, Heinz Rölleke contested Herman Grimm's earlier attestation of these stories to "Old Marie" arguing that the much younger Marie Hassenpflug had instead been the author. He argued that this also explains the sometimes verbatim correspondence with similar fairy tales by Charles Perrault: her mother was a Huguenot from the Dauphiné, and thus the family was well acquainted with French fairy tales (Rölleke noted elsewhere that the family spoke French at the dinner table until the late 1880s), which Marie, as well as her sisters Jeannette and Amalia, then told to the Grimms. This ascription, however, remains contested, most notably by Hermann Rebel in his 1988 article, "Why Not 'Old Marie'... or Someone Very Much Like Her?" and his subsequent 2010 book chapter "When Women Held the Dragons Tongue" in which he argues for the existence of 'Old Marie'.

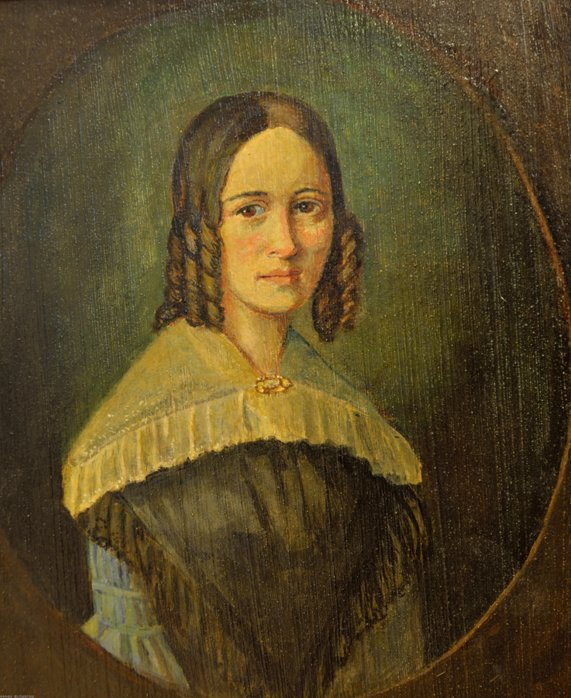
Marie Hassenpflug - Anonymous Painter (1844)
