= The Fox and the Geese =

German fairy tale

Folk tale
- Name: The Fox and the Geese
- Aarne–Thompson grouping: ATU 227
- Country: Germany
- Published in: Grimms' Fairy Tales

"The Fox and the Geese" is a German fairy tale collected by the Brothers Grimm in Grimm's Fairy Tales as tale number 86.

It is Aarne-Thompson type 227, The Geese's Eternal Prayer.

It was missing from the first printed editions of the 1812 edition. The text of the story was added to the 1815 Volume II of the KHM as Pg 387 at the end of the book as part of the corrections to the 1812 Vol I.

== Synopsis ==
A fox tells some geese it will eat them. They get permission to pray first, and pray on and on, and the story will continue when they stop.

== Context ==
This is the last story of the first volume. The Golden Key, the last story in the second volume, has a similar function.
