= The Golden Key (Grimm's Fairy Tales) =

Folk tale
- Name: The Golden Key
- Aarne–Thompson grouping: ATU 2250
- Country: Germany
- Published in: Grimms' Fairy Tales

"The Golden Key" (German: Der goldene Schlüssel) is a fairy tale (of type 2250 on the Aarne and Thompson Index), which is in place 200 of Grimms' Fairy Tales.

== Plot ==
A poor boy gathering wood with a sleigh wants to warm himself by a fire and finds a small golden key beneath the snow; then he finds a small iron box in the ground. The text ends with the statement that the reader now has to wait until he has unlocked it.

== Origin ==
Since the second part of the first edition of Grimm's Fairy Tales in 1815, The Golden Key was always in the last place; since the edition before the last one, in 1850, it was in place 200. According to their notes, the Brothers Grimm got it from Hessen (probably from Marie Hassenpflug). They mention a "similar fairy tale in the Deutsches Sprachbuch von Adolf Gutbier" (German Language Book by Adolf Gutbier), about two chickens who find a little key and a little box in the dung. The box contains a short piece of fur made of red silk, and "if it had been longer, the fairy tale would have become longer, too".

The Fox and the Geese has a similar function for the first part, which was released in 1812.
