= Stadtschloss Hanau =

Former city palace of Hanau, in Hesse, Germany

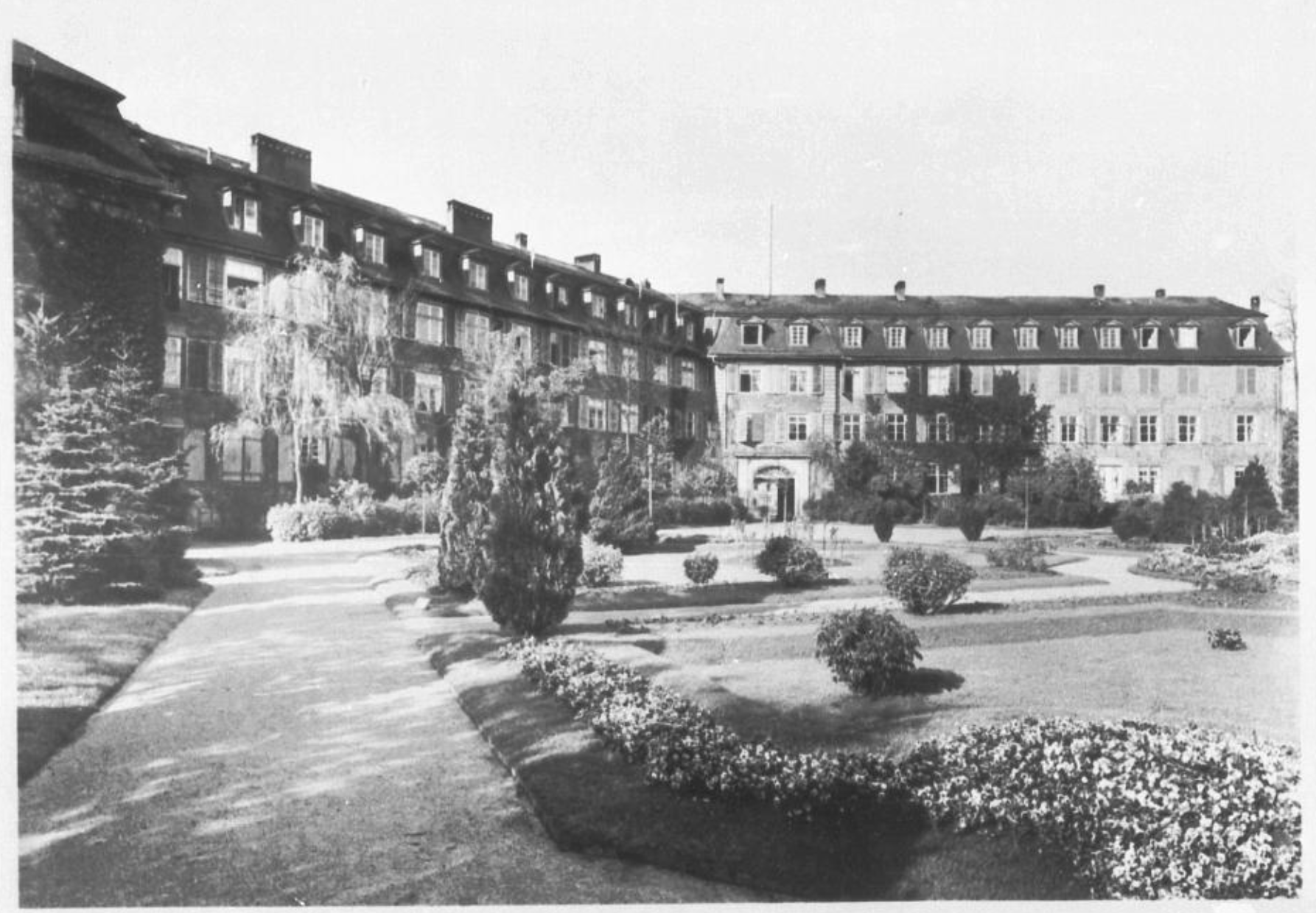
The Hanau City Palace (the Fürstenbau tract) in the first half of the 20th century

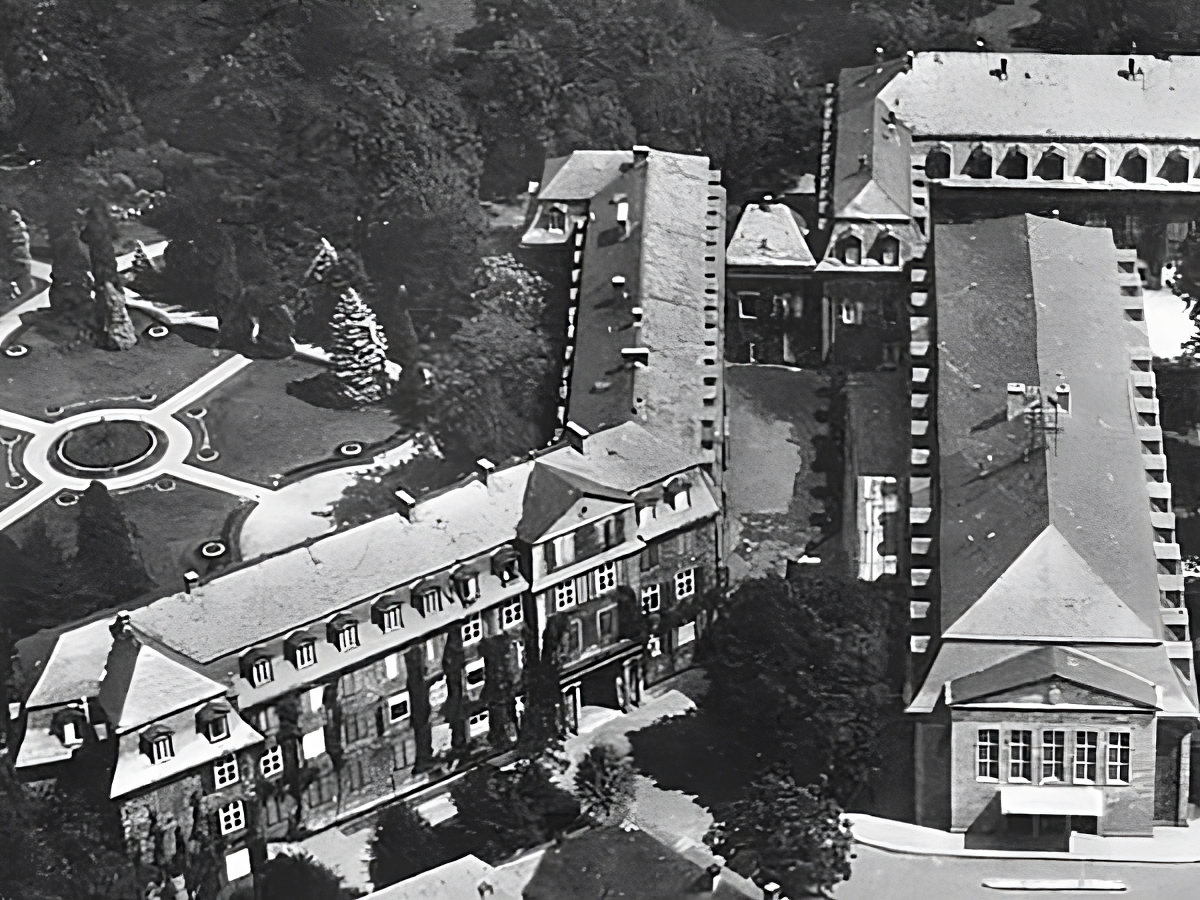
Stadtschloss Hanau from the air

The Hanau City Palace (German: Stadtschloss Hanau) is a former castle and palace in Hanau, Hesse, in Germany. It was the residence palace of the Counts of Hanau and later a secondary residence of the Electors of Hesse. The City Palace was also known as the Old Town Palace (German: Altstädter Schloss) or later as the Electoral Palace (German: Kurfürstliches Schloss).

It developed from a medieval castle complex, which was largely demolished in the 19th century, leaving only a few remnants. During the Second World War, the palace was severely damaged and subsequently mostly torn down, although it could easily have been reconstructed. As a result, only a few auxiliary buildings of the former residence remain today. While there are only sparse sources regarding the appearance of the medieval castle, the various construction phases from the 16th century onwards can be reconstructed from documents and older depictions.

== Location ==
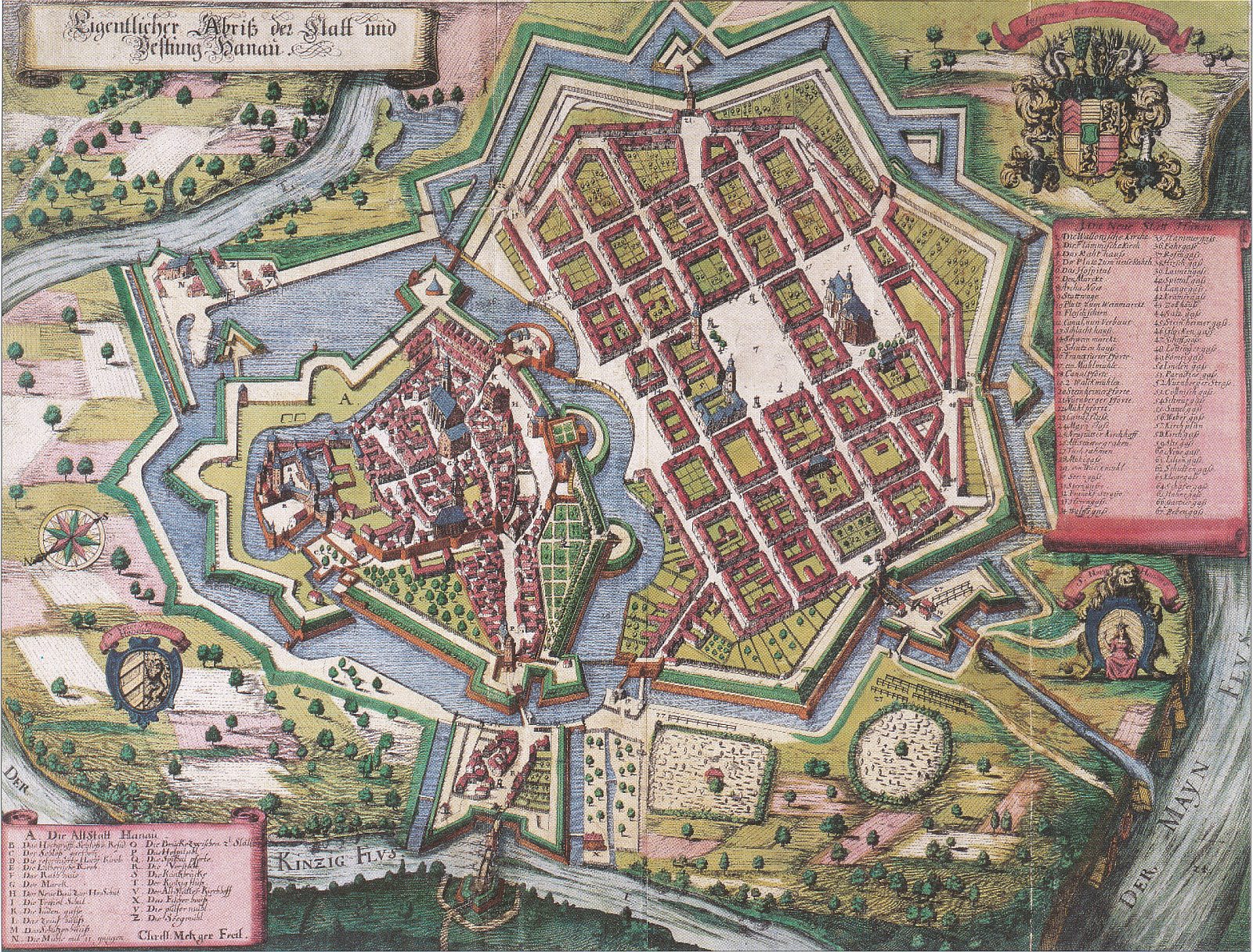
1682 map of Hanau showing the location of Stadtschloss Hanau to the left of the old city

The city palace was located in the southern part of what is now the palace garden, north of the city hall, and on part of the site where the Karl-Rehbein School stands today, at an elevation of about 104 meters above sea level. Here, the Kinzig River forms a wide arc from the east to the south, enclosing the palace area.

== History ==
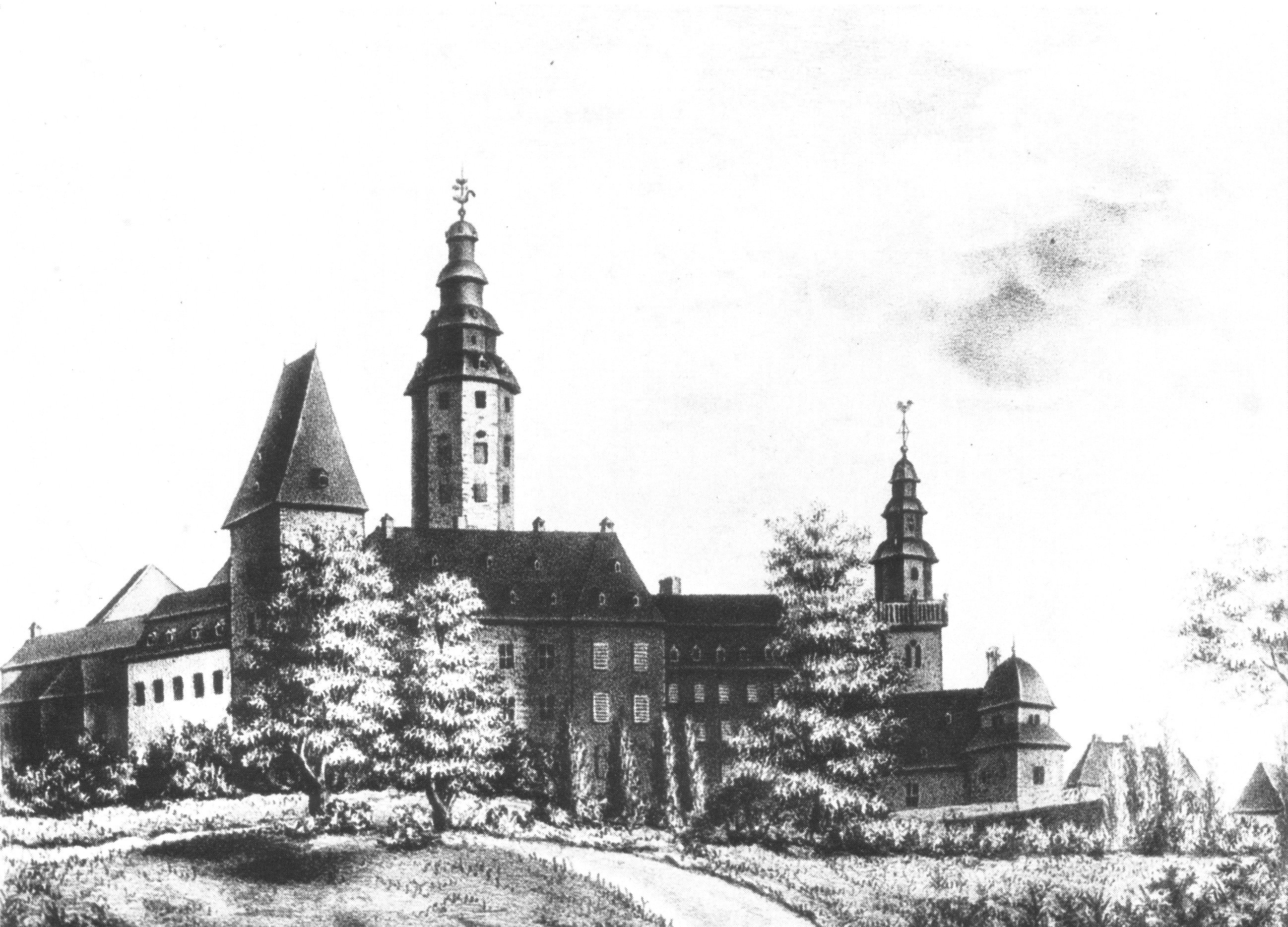
The Hanau City Palace around 1828

=== Medieval Period ===
In the 12th century, the Lords of Hanau-Buchen had a moated castle built on an island enclosed by arms of the Kinzig River. The builder is believed to be Dammo von Hagenowe, who is mentioned in a Mainz deed from 1143. The nearest settlement was the later deserted village of Kinzdorf. After 1170, the Lords of Hanau-Dorfelden took over the castle. By this time, people had already begun to settle around the castle, marking the beginning of the village and later the city of Hanau (since February 2, 1303).

The castle itself is first mentioned as "Castrum in Hagenowen" in a document from 1234. "Hagenowe" referred to the forest surrounding the castle. Little is known about the castle's construction history during the medieval period. Archaeological excavations in 2001 and 2002 uncovered parts of the castle's moat wall, which was founded on an oak timber platform. This was dated dendrochronologically to the year 1302.

With Reinhard I, the Lords and (since 1429) Counts of Hanau, later Hanau-Münzenberg, took over the Hanau Castle. During the 15th century, it became their main residence, which had previously been located at Windecken Castle at times.

=== The Renaissance ===
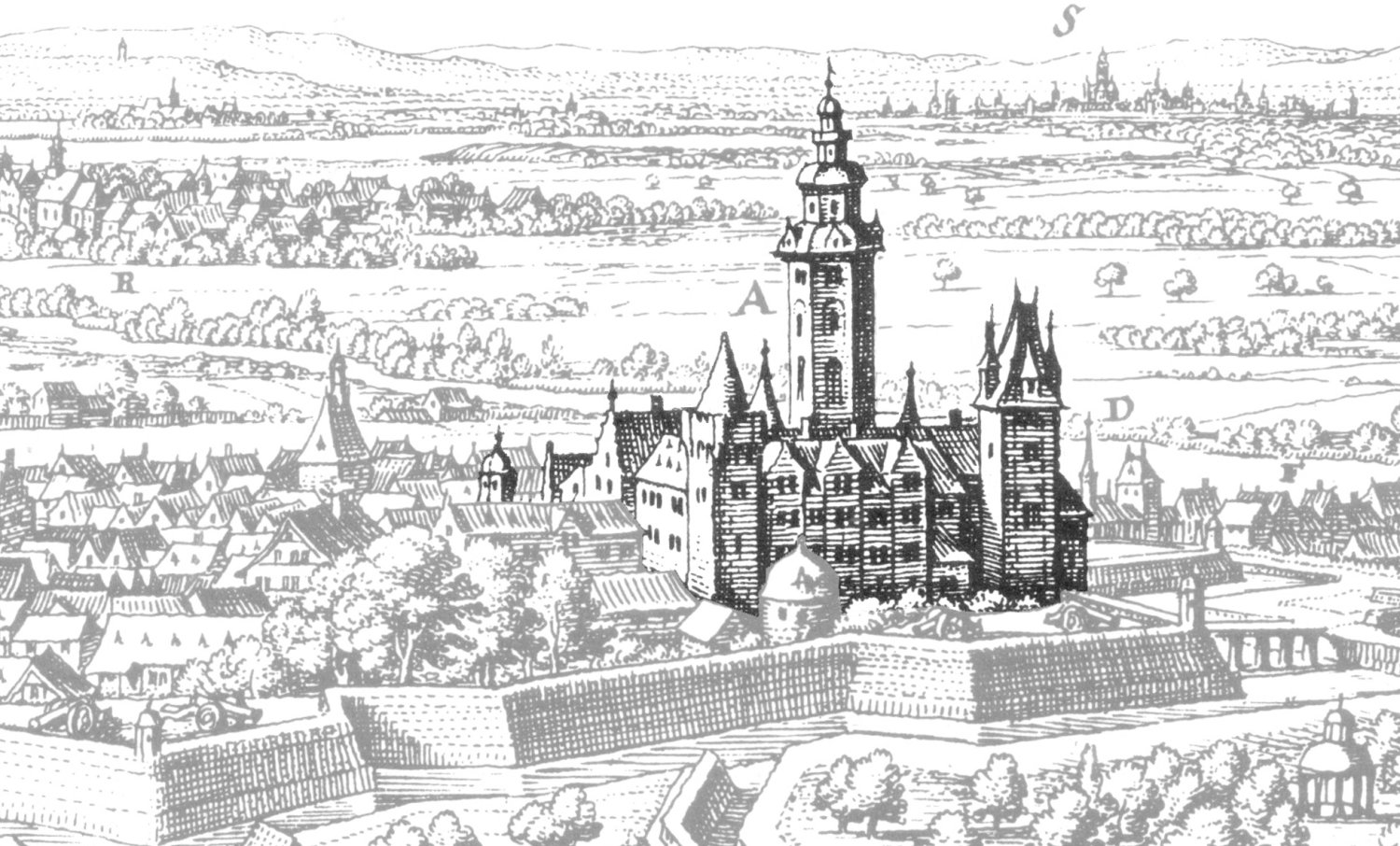
The Hanau City Palace on a View of Hanau by Matthäus Merian the Elder (1632)

In 1528, under Philipp II, Count of Hanau-Münzenberg, the city and palace of Hanau were newly fortified according to a theoretical defense system designed by Albrecht Dürer, which was built here for the first time. The moat between the castle and the forecourt was filled in and leveled, creating an inner castle courtyard, the later "small palace courtyard." The work lasted until about 1560, during the reign of Philipp III, Count of Hanau-Münzenberg.

From the 16th century onwards, the living standards in the medieval castle no longer met the expectations of its inhabitants. The castle was gradually expanded into a palace, with Count Philipp Ludwig II (1576–1612) playing a key role in this transformation. From 1604 to 1606, a new chancery building was constructed (later integrated into the "Fürstenbau"), along with a portal building featuring a two-story bay window above the gate passage, known as the "Erkerbau," in the Renaissance style. The former keep was modernized in its upper section and adorned with a three-story roof structure.

Larger plans by Philipp Ludwig II, such as transforming the complex into a Renaissance palace with a rectangular layout, were not realized due to his early death and the outbreak of the Thirty Years' War. A plan for these renovations, which is difficult to interpret, is preserved in the Hessian State Archive in Marburg. It appears that a rectangular wing was intended to be built in the northern part of the complex, incorporating the pigeon tower despite its differing orientation. Large parts of the core castle, including the keep, were to be demolished. Ultimately, a wing was added to the northwest of the core castle, consisting mostly of half-timbered buildings, which can be seen on the Merian engraving.

=== The Baroque Era ===
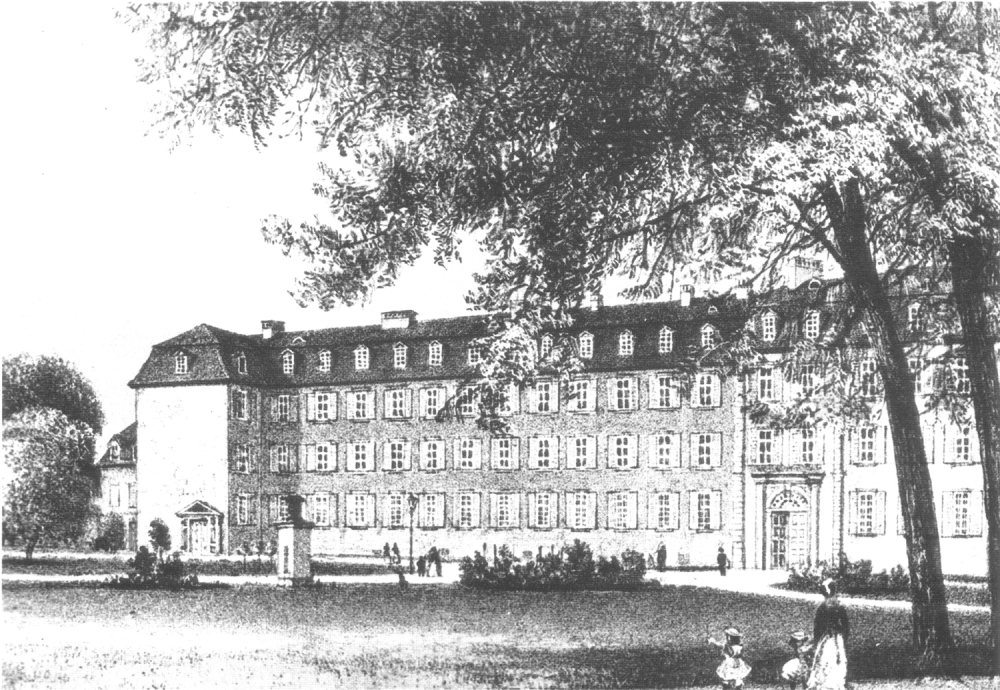
The Fürstenbau tract of the Hanau City Palace

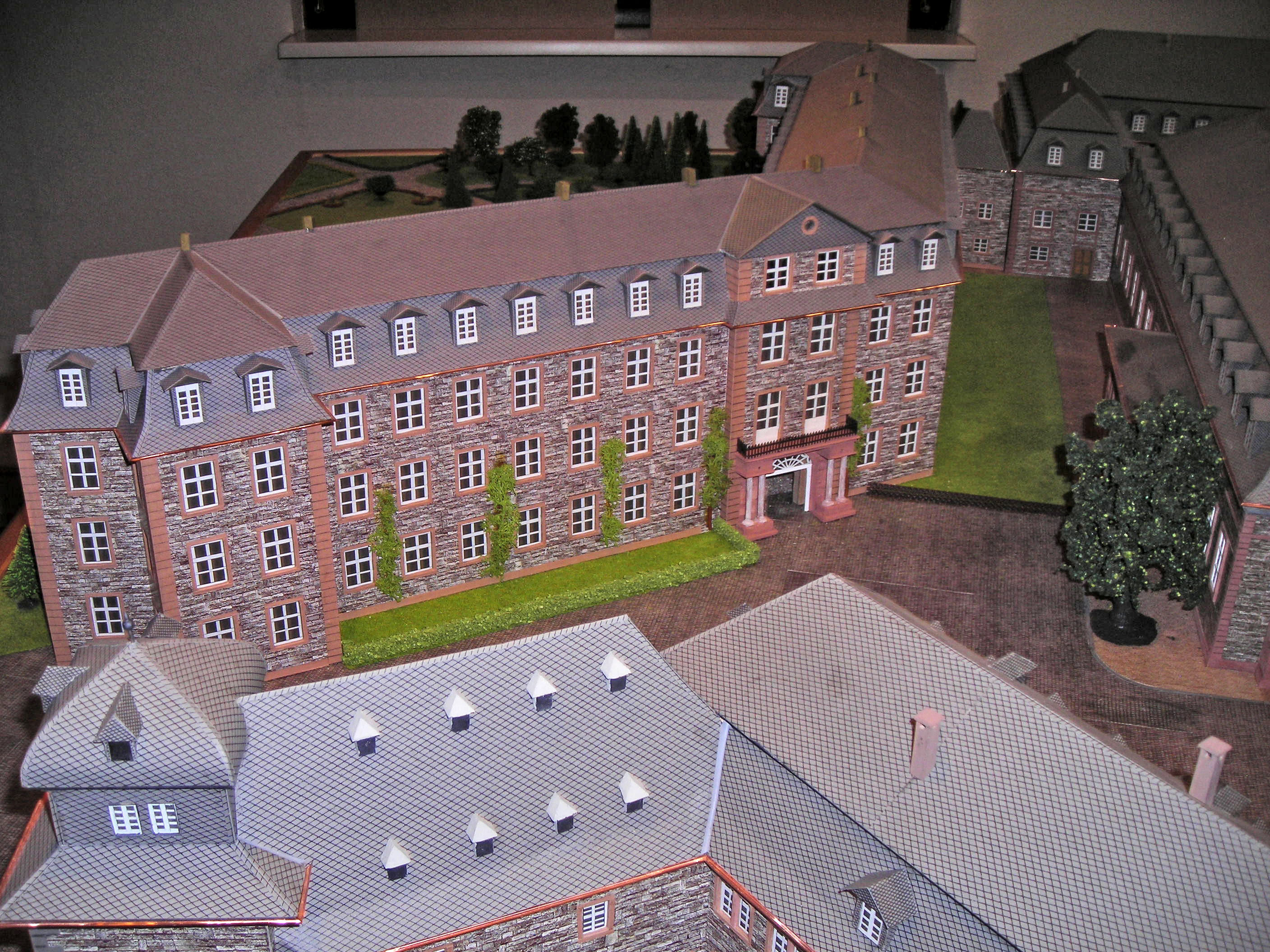
The Fürstenbau tract in a model of the old city of Hanau

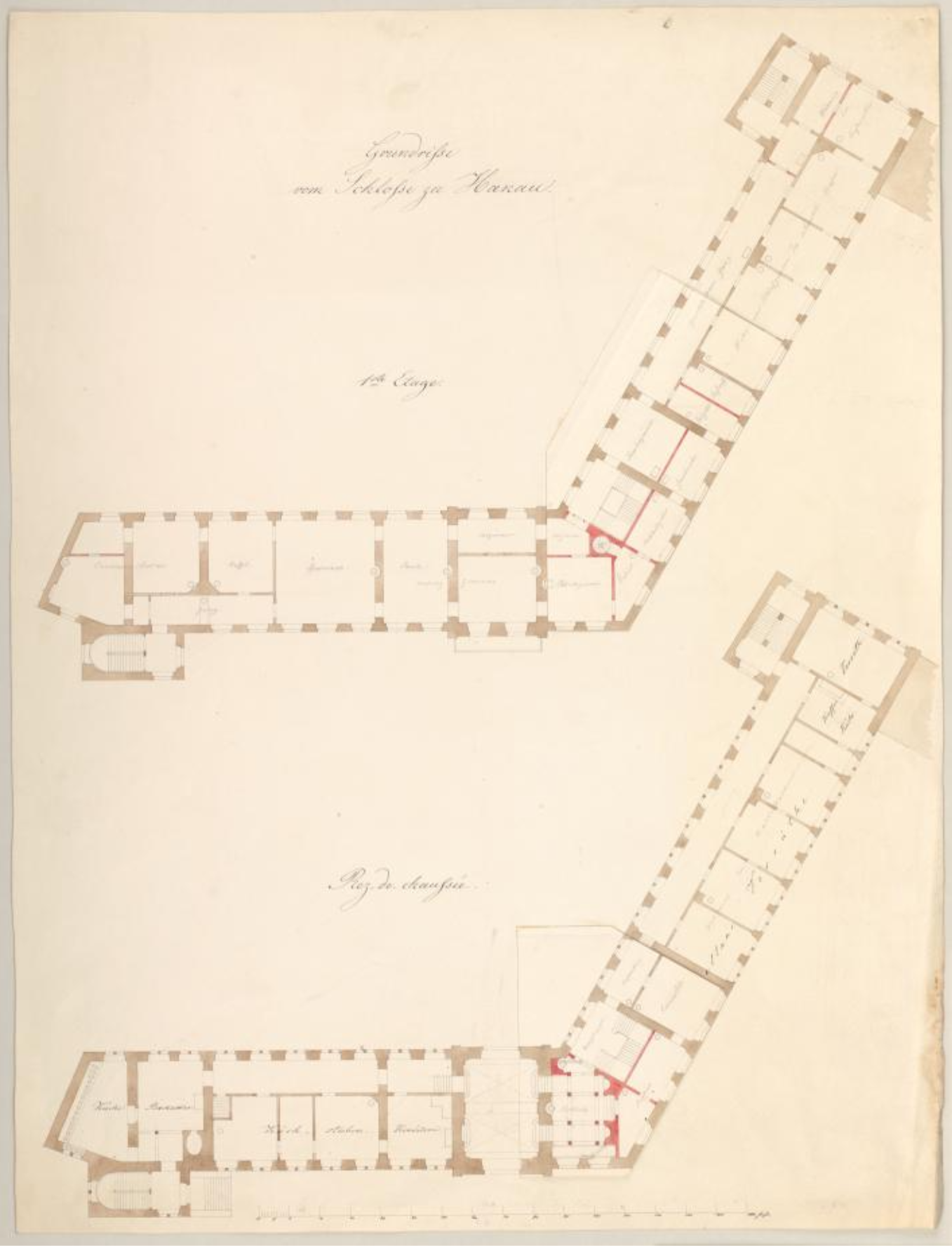
Plan of the Fürstenbau tract around 1840-1852

Even the Baroque modifications did not result in a uniform complex. Instead, the wings of the palace formed an irregular ensemble. Philipp Reinhard, Count of Hanau-Münzenberg (1664–1712) began modernizing the residence palace, though his efforts were modest, as he also laid the foundation stone for the later-named Schloss Philippsruhe in 1701. From 1685 to 1691, a new chancery building was constructed in the southern palace courtyard facing the town, which is one of the few remaining buildings from the complex and was used as the city library from 1953 to 2015. In the northern wing of the palace, which had previously housed the chancery, residential rooms were created. On a plot next to the palace that had been used as a garden, Count Philipp Reinhard had a stable (Marstall) built, which was completed in 1713 by his brother and successor, Johann Reinhard III (1665–1736). The architect was Julius Ludwig Rothweil, who also designed the plans for Schloss Philippsruhe. Due to the construction of the stable, the bridge over the palace moat had to be relocated and replaced with a new one.

Johann Reinhard, the last count from the House of Hanau, extended the northern wing of the palace eastward. Additionally, the Fürstenbau (noble wing) received a grand entrance with pairs of columns on either side and a balcony above. Between 1723 and 1728, Johann Reinhard had the palace moat filled in and a new carriage house built east of the stable, which was later converted into the Friedrichsbau under the rule of Landgravine Maria of Hesse-Kassel (1723–1772), who was regent of the County of Hanau-Münzenberg from 1760 to 1764. This building section was located roughly where the Karl-Rehbein School stands today. Landgravine Maria also had the palace garden laid out in 1766.

By the end of the 18th century, the Hanau City Palace had reached its greatest extent, thanks to these new constructions. After the death of the last count of Hanau, the County of Hanau-Münzenberg, with Hanau as its capital, passed to the Landgraviate of Hesse-Kassel and later the Electorate of Hesse. The palace occasionally served as a secondary residence for members of the landgravial and later electoral family. From 1786 to 1792, it served as the widow's residence of Landgravine Philippine, the second wife of Frederick II of Hesse-Kassel, who was born a princess of Prussia from the Brandenburg-Schwedt branch. She adorned the palace with luxurious furnishings in the latest fashion, but took them with her to her new palace in Berlin after 1792.

During the Grand Duchy of Frankfurt, to which Hanau belonged for a few brief years, the Hanau city palace was the meeting place for the only session of the Estates Assembly of the Grand Duchy, which was opened on 15 October 1810.

=== Gallery: Plan of the Hanau City Palace by Jakob Friedrich Heerwagen in 1774 ===
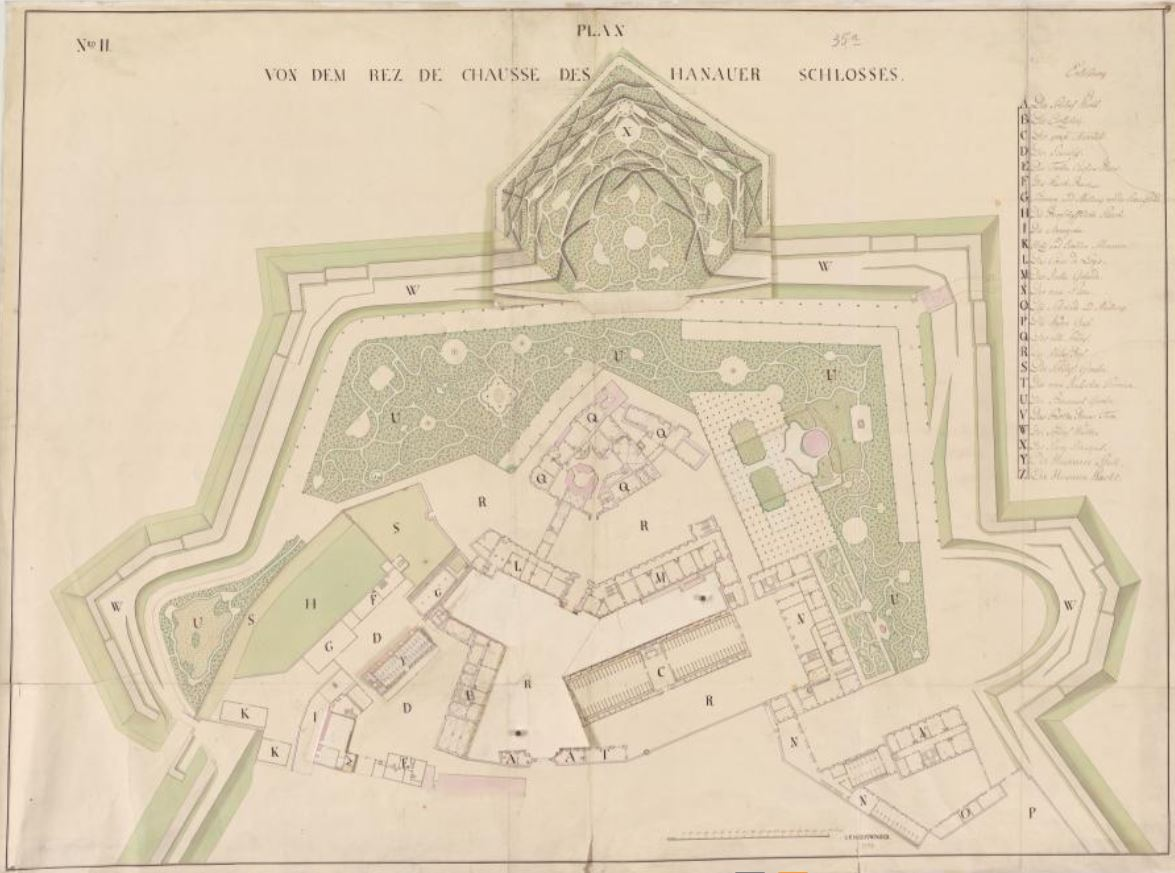
Plan of the castle, palace and park and gardens

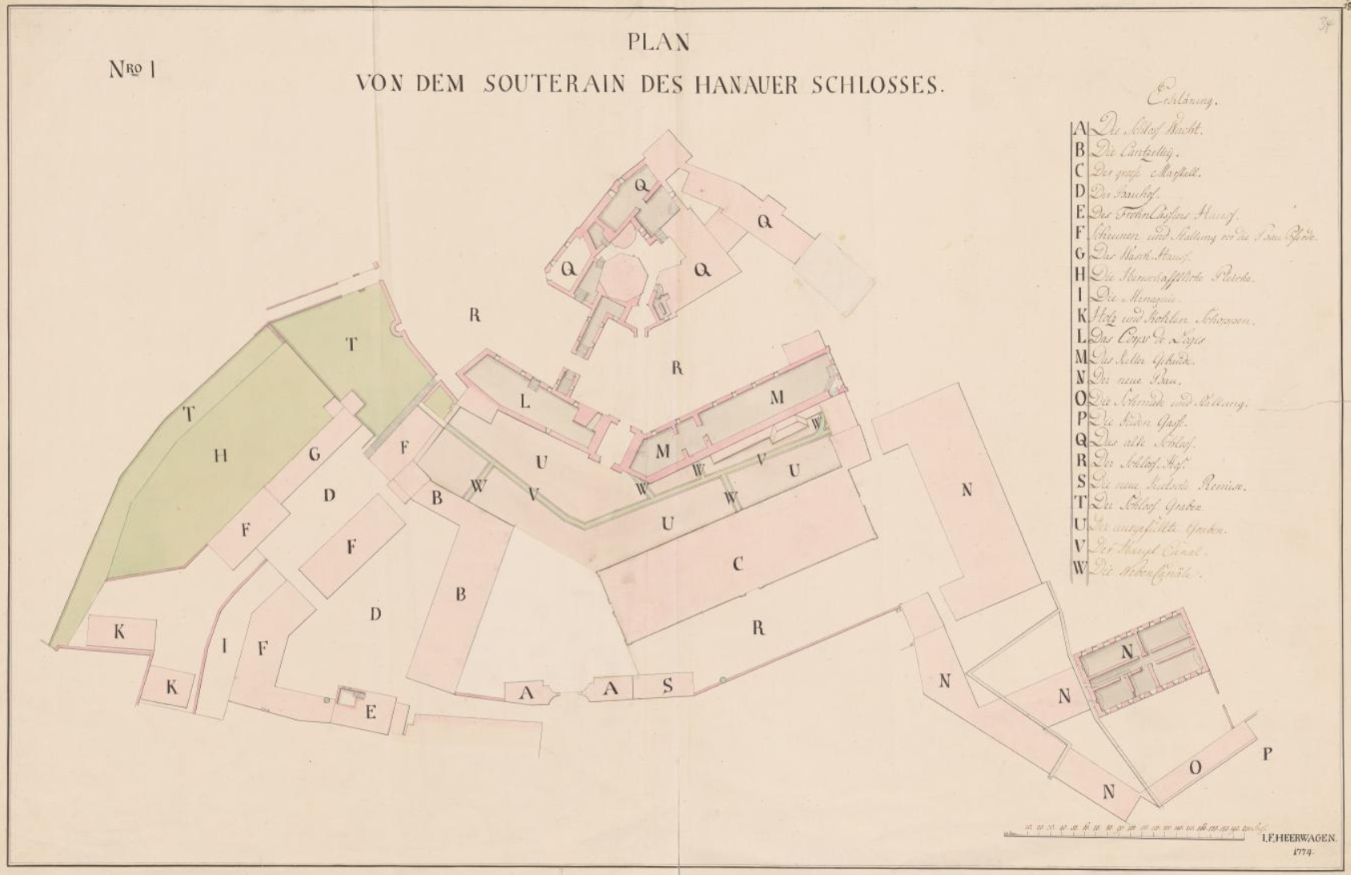
Plan of the ground floor

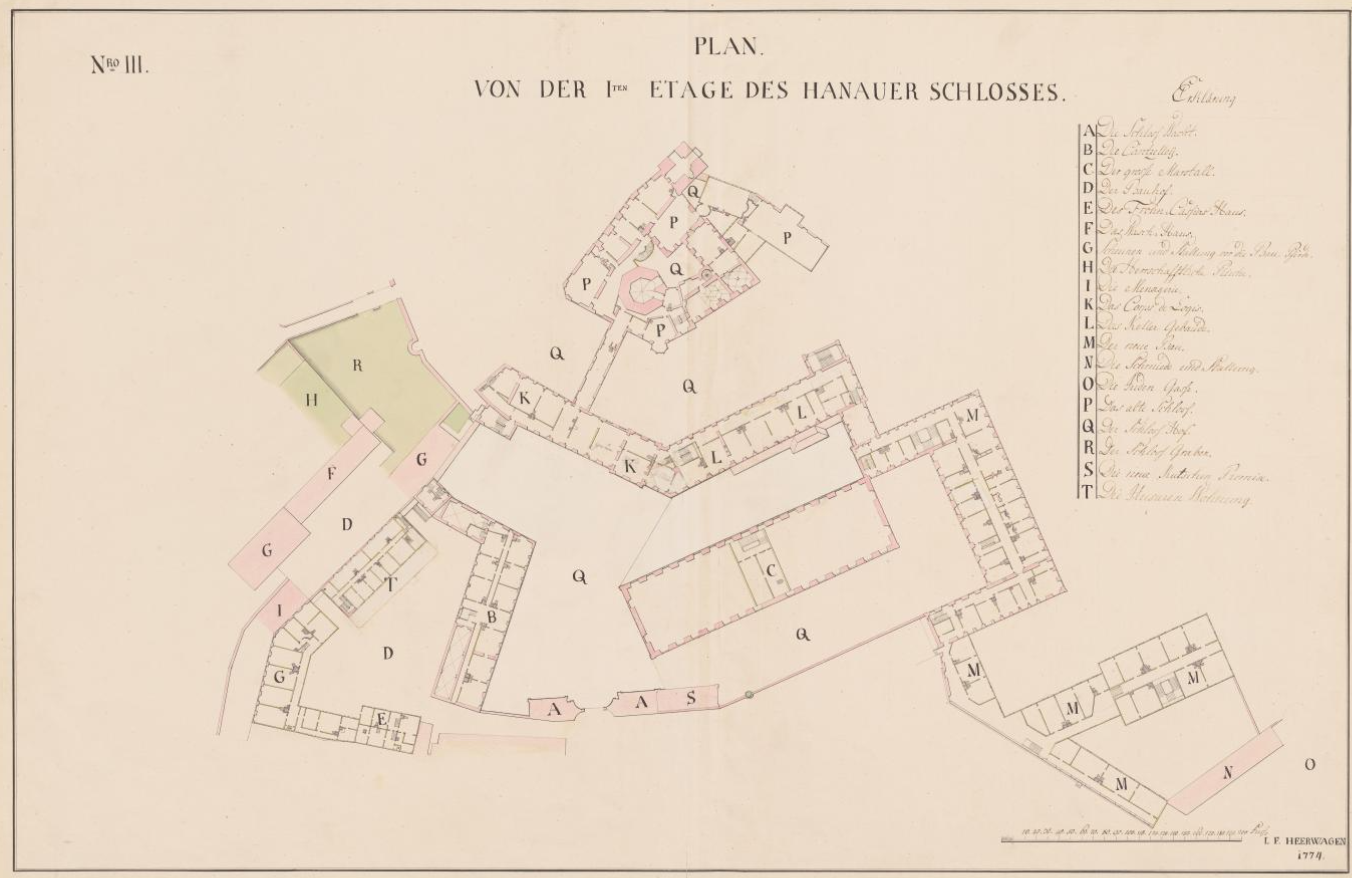
Plan of the first floor

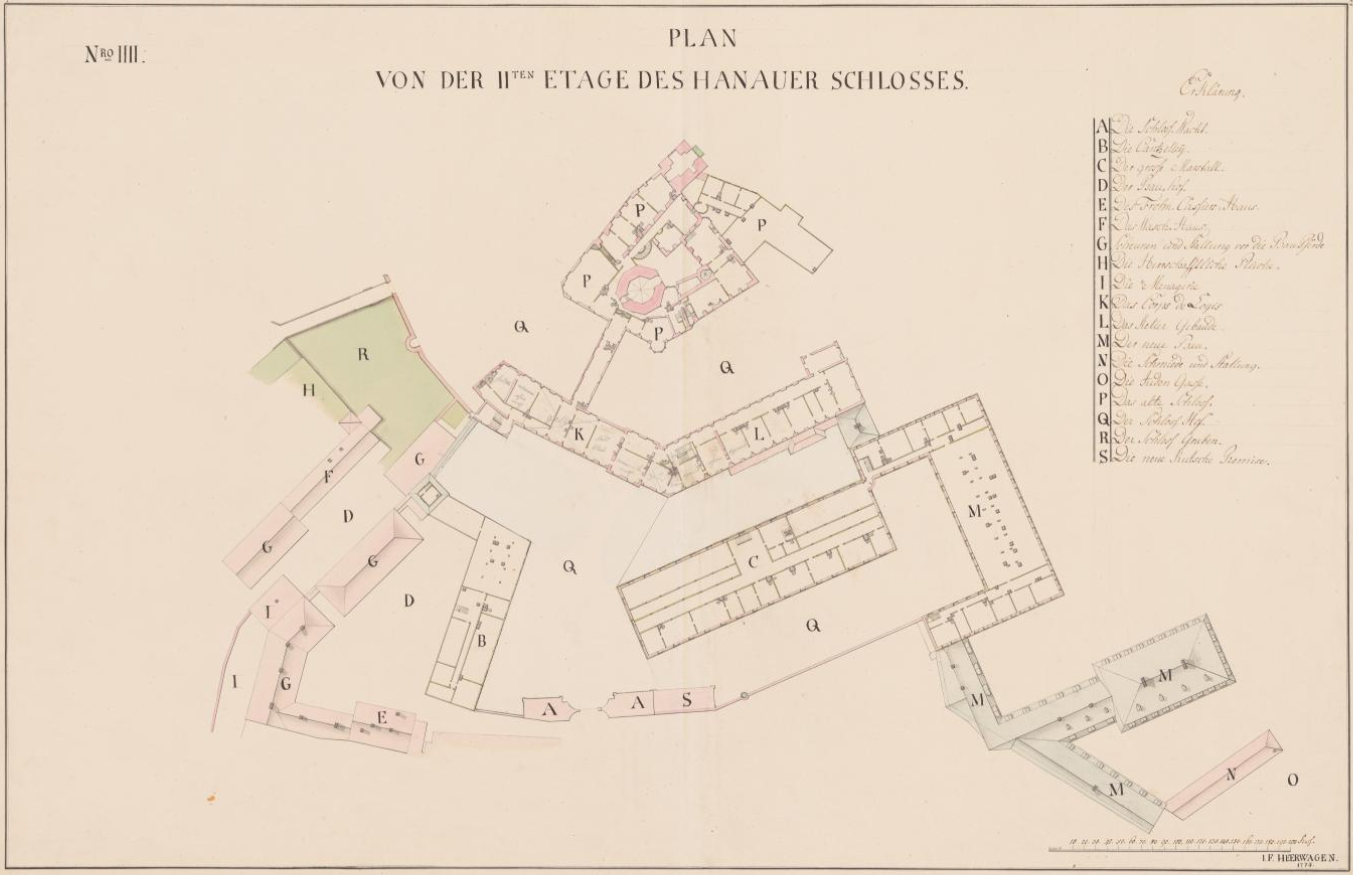
Plan of the second floor

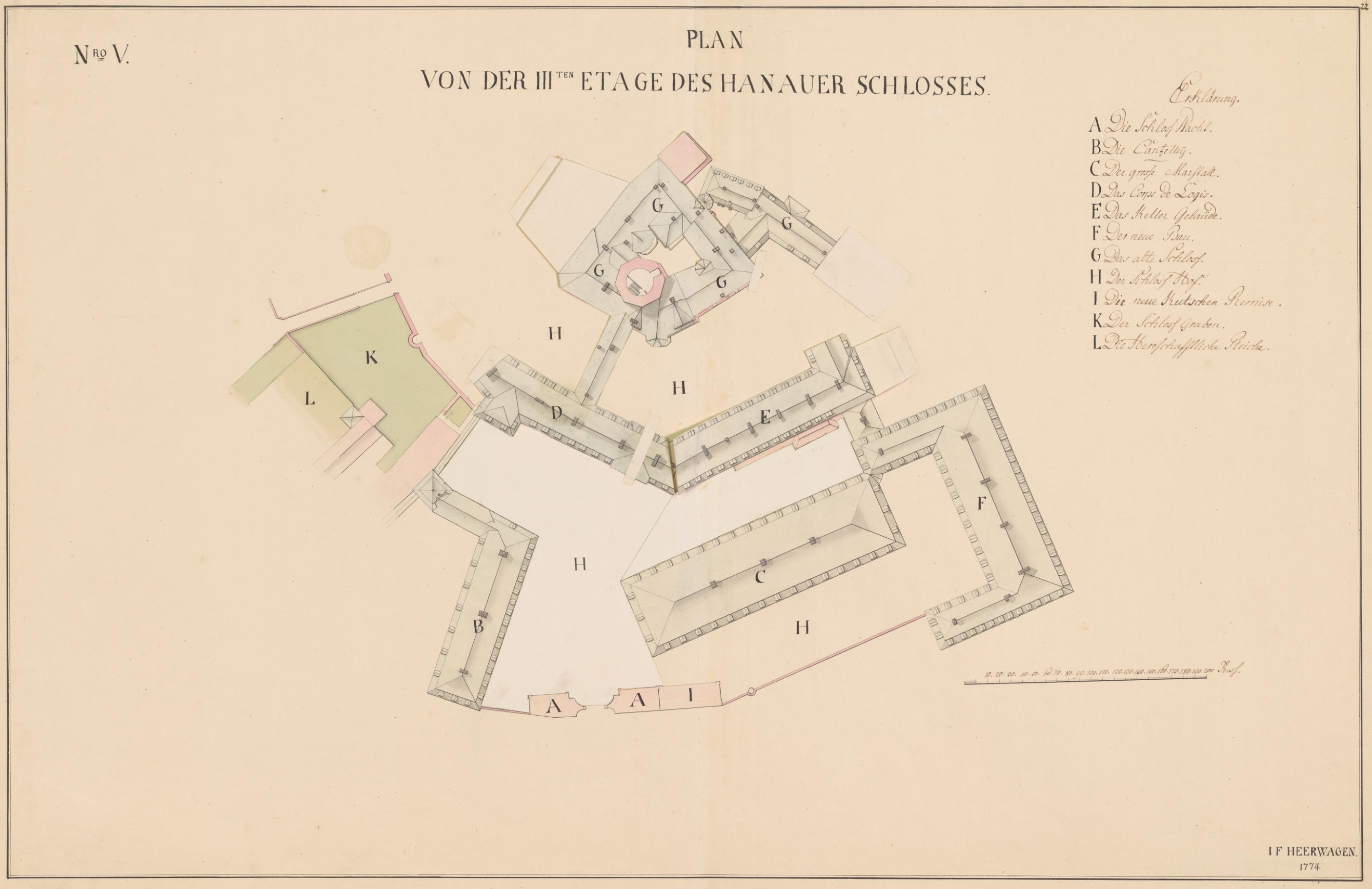
Plan of the third floor: The medieval castle (G) on top, with the Fürstenbau right below (D). The Friedrichsbau (F) is to the right

=== From the Start of the 19th Century to World War II ===
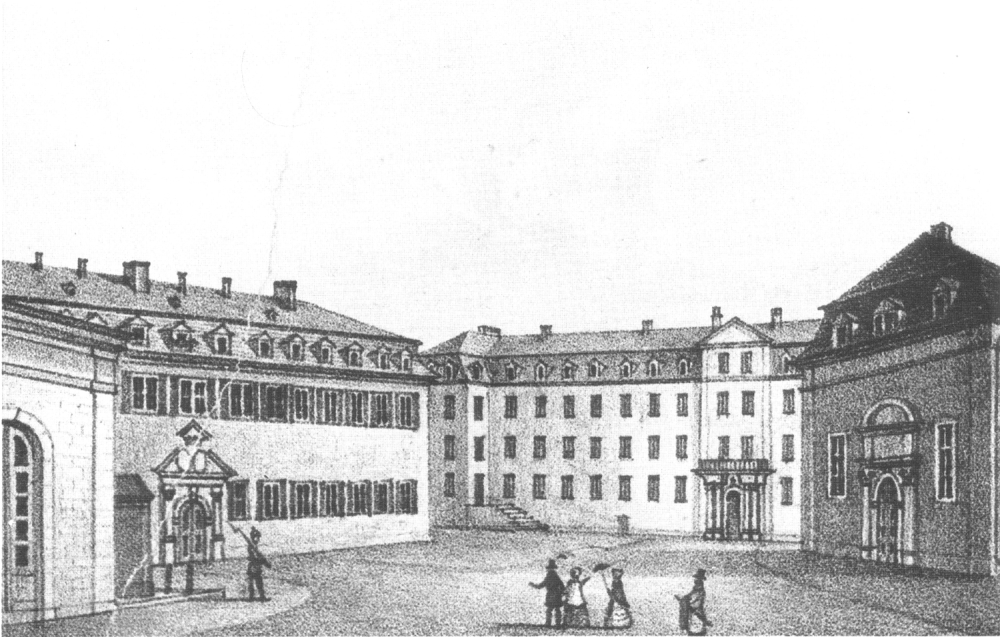
The Schlossplatz around 1870 looking at the Fürstenbau, to the left the Chancery and on the right the stables

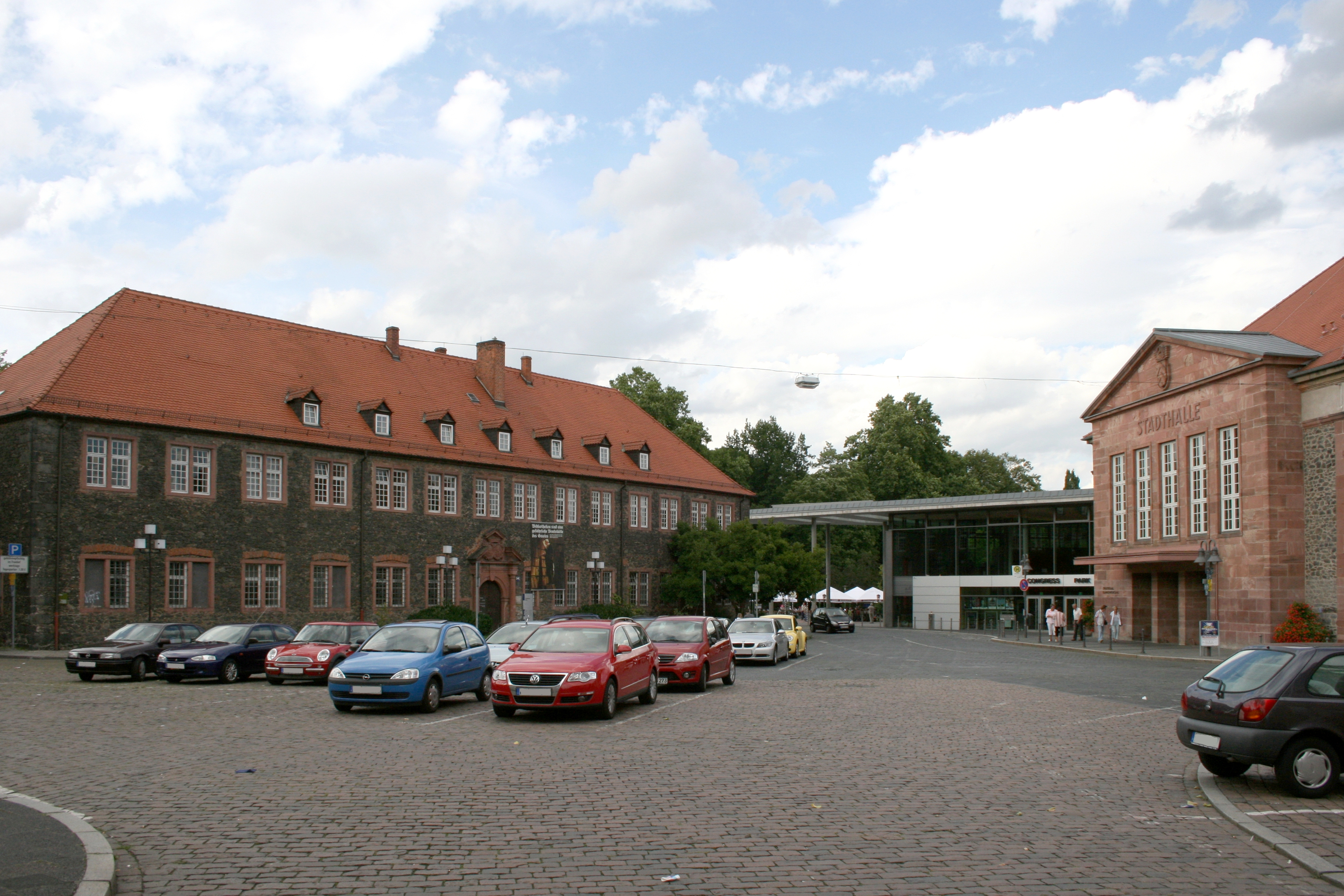
Same view of the Schlossplatz as above, but in 2008

In 1829/30, the medieval part of the complex, the original castle, was demolished under Elector William II to create more space for the palace garden and a carriage house. The medieval sections no longer met the functional expectations of the 19th century, and the historical aspect of the site was of no importance to William II.

In 1866, the Electorate of Hesse was annexed by Prussia, and the palace was no longer needed as a royal residence. In 1890, the city of Hanau purchased the palace. Apartments and offices were established in the Fürstenbau and Friedrichsbau. From 1927, the mayor's official residence was located in the Fürstenbau. The Museum of the Wetterauische Society for Natural History moved into the former chancery building. Additionally, the palace housed a post office, the Chamber of Commerce, a music academy, a pharmaceutical factory, the civil registry, and, from 1942, the Museum of the Hanau Historical Society.

In 1928, the stables (Marstall) were converted into a town hall (Stadthalle). The most notable change to the exterior was the addition of a sandstone gable as the new main entrance on the narrow side of the building facing the palace square. The Stadthalle was used for events, concerts, theater performances, exhibitions, conferences, and film and slideshow presentations. After the Nazis came to power, they staged the first synchronized city council meeting as a Nazi rally in the main hall on March 28, 1933. During World War II, the hall served as a military hospital.

=== The End: the Destruction ===
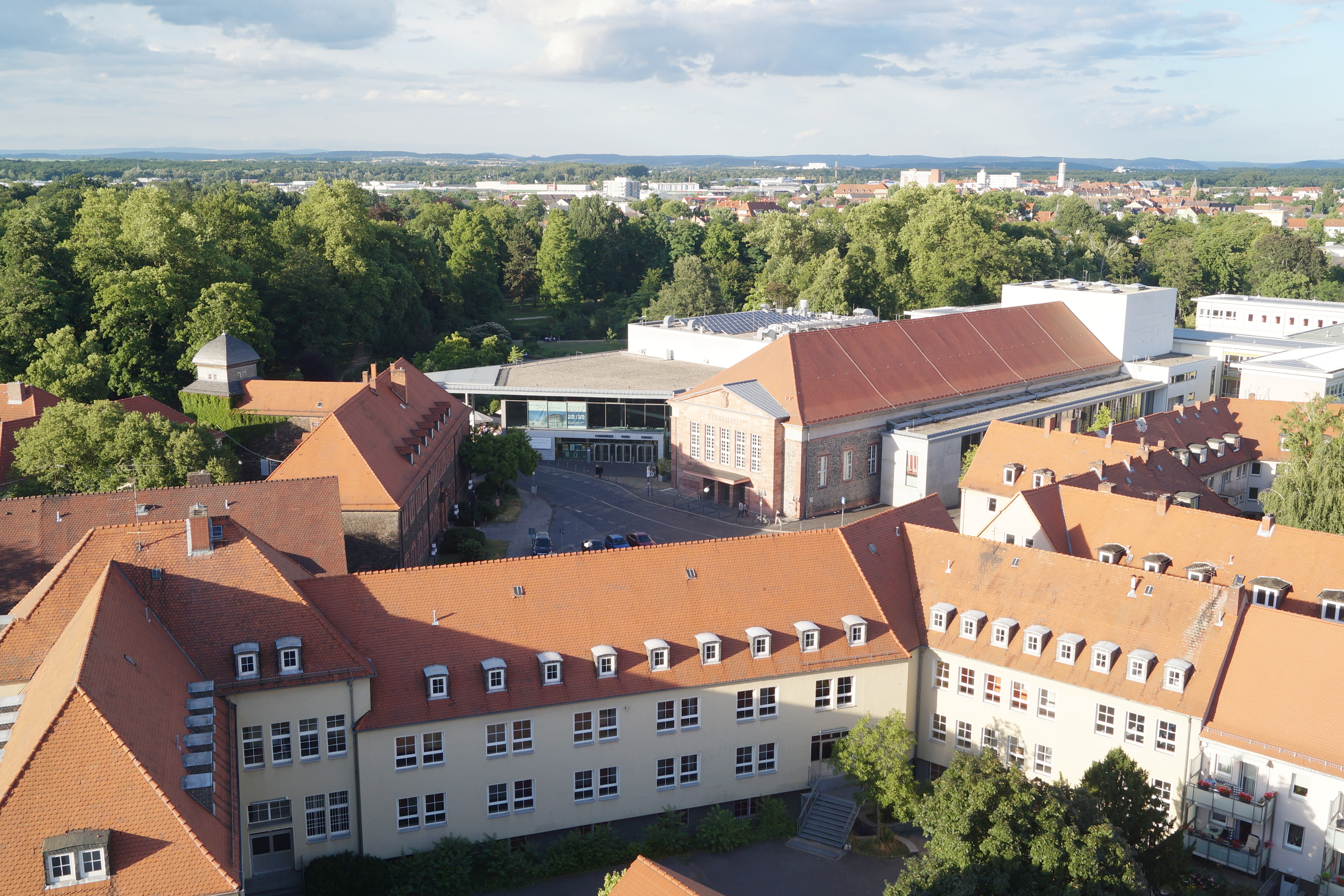
The Schlossplatz with the remaining City Palace buildings in 2017

During the air raids on Hanau on 6 January 1945, and another attack on 19 March 1945, by the Royal Air Force, the city palace and the city hall (German: Stadthalle) were destroyed. A portion of the collection exhibited in the museum of the Historical Society was also lost in the fire. After the war, only the Stadthalle and the Kanzleigebäude were rebuilt. The Stadthalle was reopened on 16 December 1950.

The city palace, whose exterior walls were still standing, was demolished, along with several other heavily damaged but important historical buildings in downtown Hanau, such as the baroque armoury, the baroque city theater at Freiheitsplatz, and the Edelsheim Palace. This was despite opposition, including from the Historical Society, which advocated for preserving the Fürstenbau and Friedrichsbau. The official reason given for the demolitions was that, given the shortage of housing, people might settle in the ruins. However, only the outer walls of the palace buildings remained intact. In reality, the demolition was likely driven by the municipal administration's aversion to what they deemed useless remnants of a past they no longer identified with, as well as the completely different architectural goals of the time. Soon after, the city constructed "modern" and functional buildings in that area, such as the Karl-Rehbein School and an annex to the Stadthalle, known as the Bürgerhaus. The Hanau Social-Democratic politician Heinrich Fischer is said to have boasted, "We have eradicated the traces of feudalism."

Between 2001 and 2003, the Stadthalle underwent significant renovation, becoming part of a new congress center (Congress Park Hanau, CPH) and receiving a modern annex on its southern side. Although this annex is largely made of glass, it mostly obscures the historical facade and the richly decorated baroque sandstone portal of the southern gate. Nevertheless, the Stadthalle is considered a cultural monument under Hessian monument protection law. The Bürgerhaus was demolished and replaced by the modern structures of the CPH.

== The Building: The Medieval Castle ==
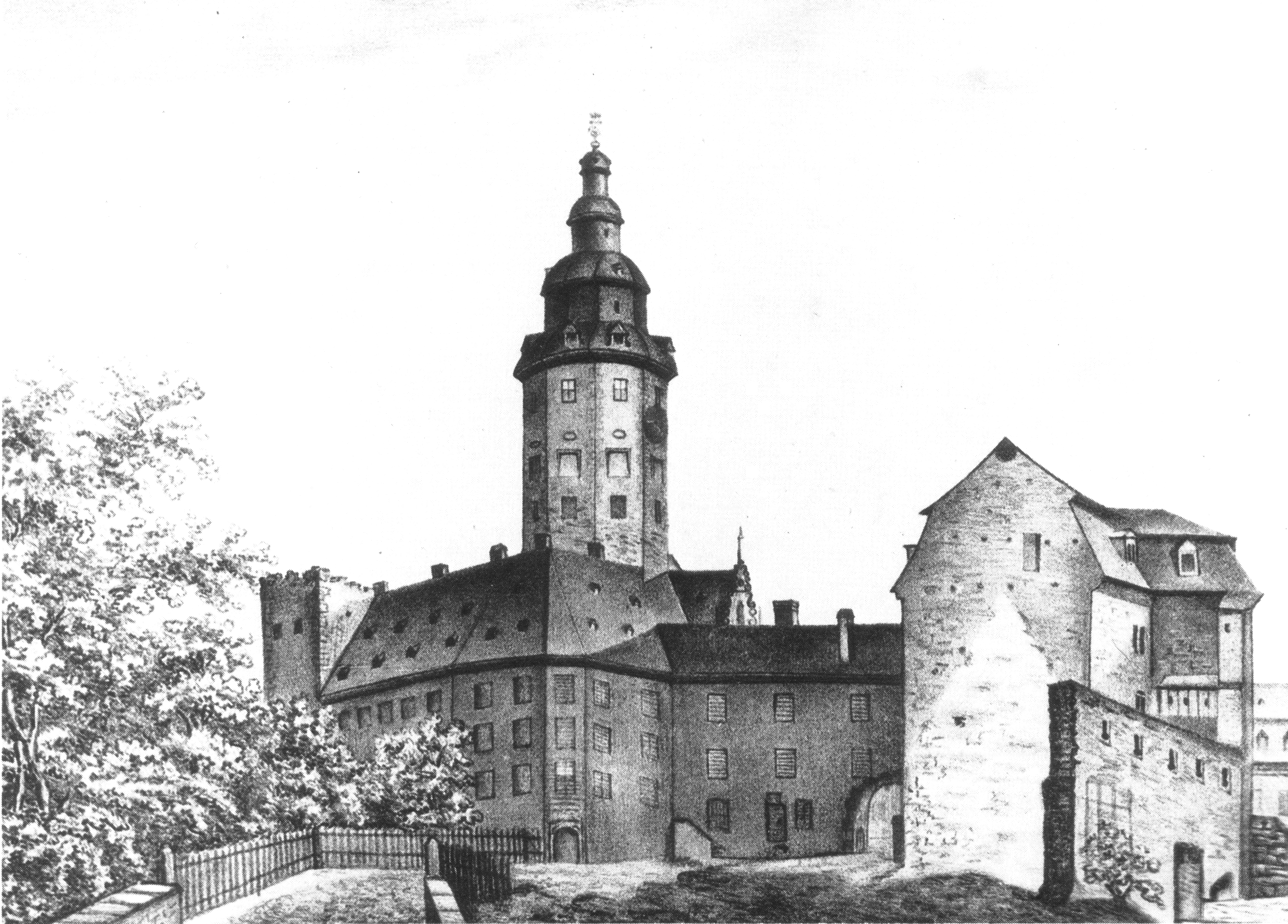
The medieval castle during its demolishment

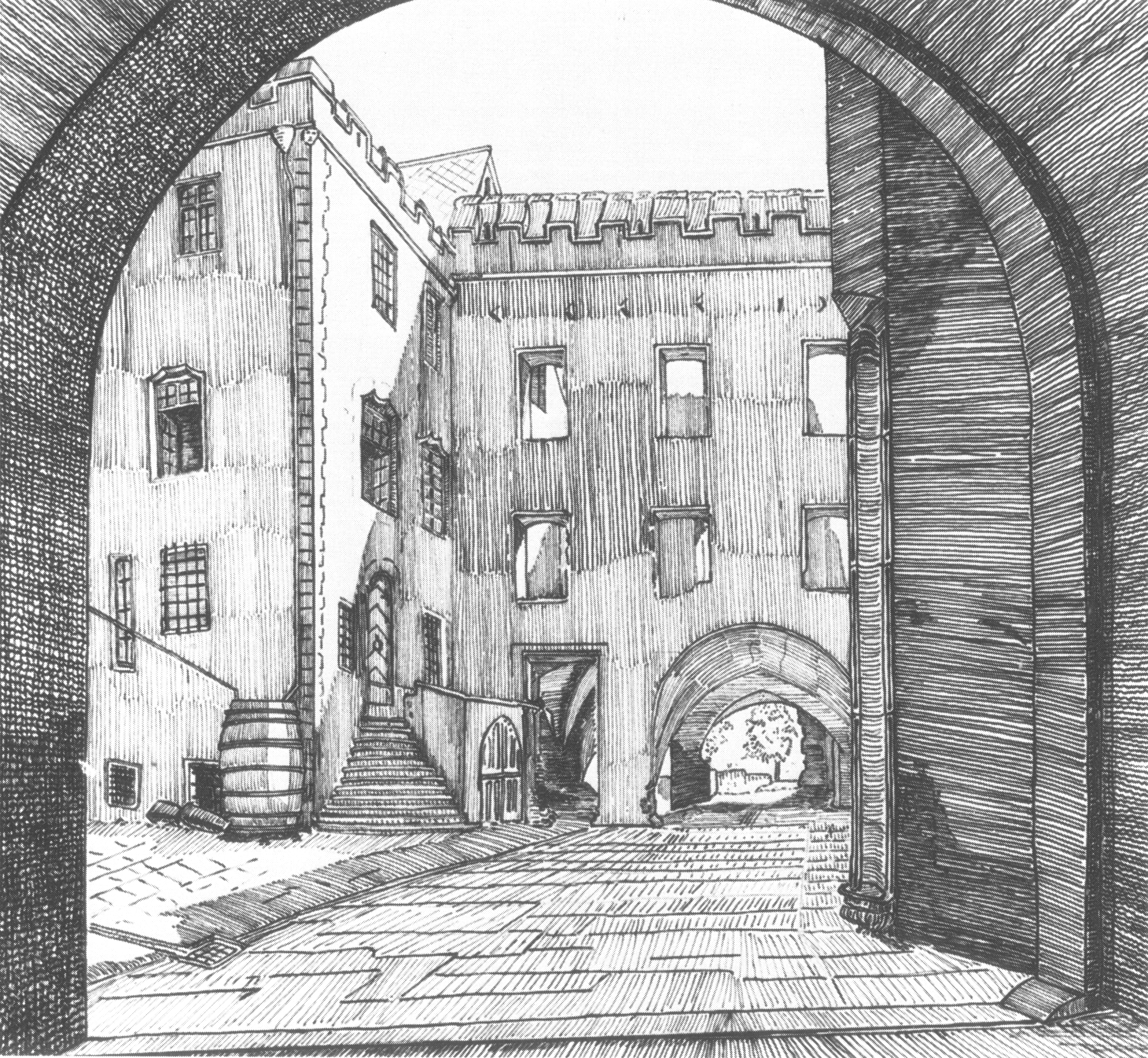
The courtyard during its demolishment

The original moated castle likely consisted of the typical structures of a fortress from that era: a defensive wall and moat, a gate protected by a drawbridge, the main hall (German: Palas), a keep (German: Bergfried), and service buildings. Similar residences from medieval foundations include the castles of Babenhausen, Büdingen, and Erbach. Over the centuries, numerous renovations were carried out, leading to the courtyards being almost completely built over. The cramped space in the courtyards is evident in many engravings. Drawings made just before the castle's demolition in 1829 depict at least two narrow gate passages within the main castle.

=== The Keep ===
The most prominent part of the medieval castle was the keep (also called the "Heidenturm") located in the courtyard. For a long time, this tower was the tallest building in the city and the centerpiece of the medieval complex. It remains unclear whether its base was hexagonal or octagonal, as plans exist for both versions. Early city views around 1600 already show the tower with a three-story crown and domed roofs, which were added in 1605 during renovations under Count Philipp Ludwig II. The earlier form of the tower's upper section is unknown, but due to its height and base, it might have been a "butter churn" tower. Views from the inner castle courtyard show that after renovations in the early 17th century, the tower featured a rusticated stone façade, with shell-decorated niches in its lower section. Later, the tower also had a clock. Despite attempts to save at least the tower during the 1829 demolition, a petition by the citizens of Hanau failed. The clock was relocated and installed in the tower of St. John's Church at the end of the 19th century.

=== Archive ===
Tower Located to the east of the main castle, the second-largest tower (also called the "Dovecote") reinforced the castle on the field side. It is likely one of the oldest parts of the castle, besides the keep, and connected the residential buildings on the northeastern side of the castle at an oblique angle. The Hanau archivist Johann Adam Bernhard noted finding the year 1375 inscribed on it. Later engravings show the tower with a steep gabled roof and a small oriel, likely a waste chute. The name "Archive Tower" suggests that the castle's archive was stored here for some time, possibly before the construction of the new chancery.

=== St. Martin's Chapel ===
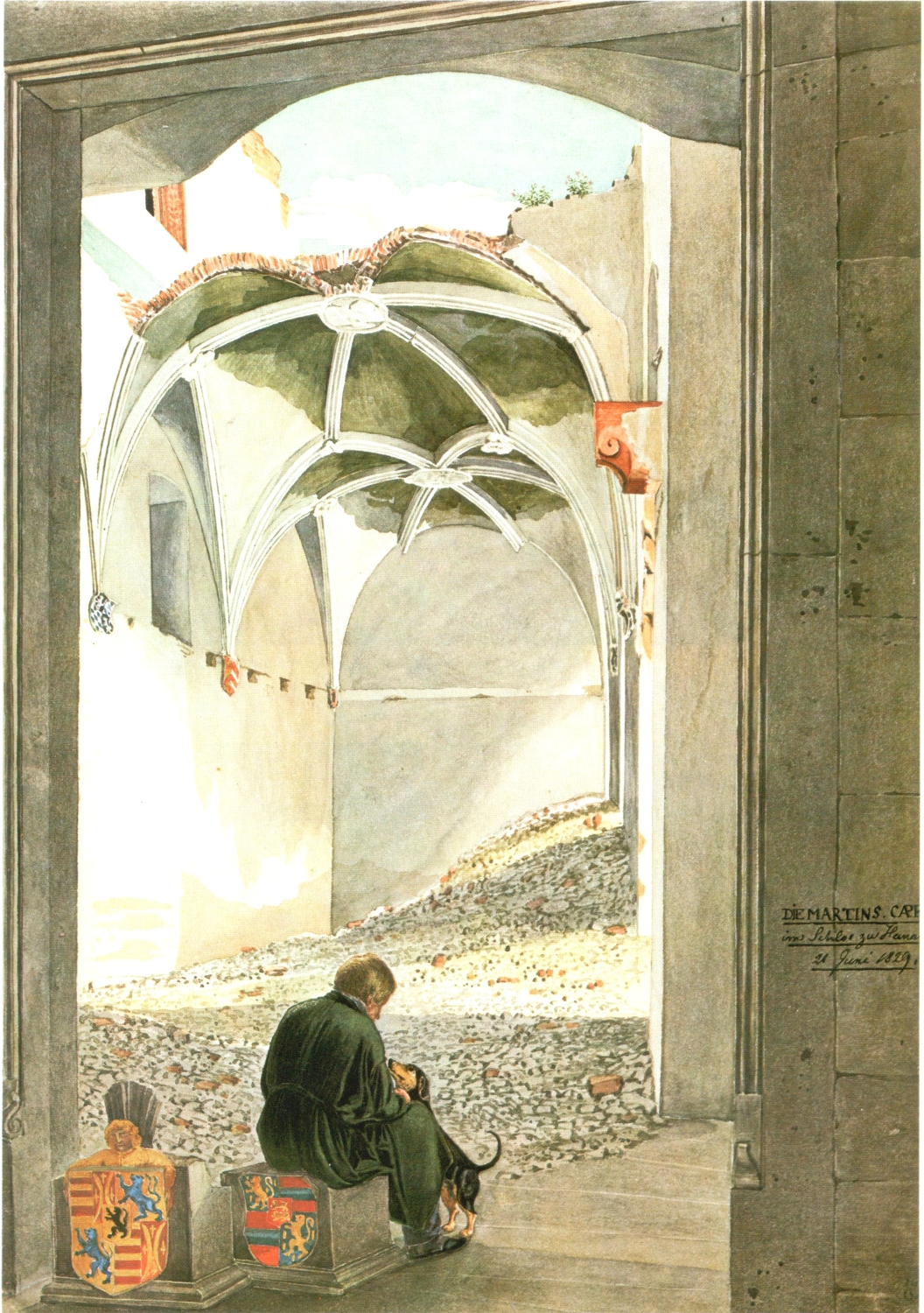
The chapel during its demolishment

The existence of a chapel in the castle is primarily known through written sources. It is unclear whether it was built with the founding of the castle in the 12th century, as a St. Martin's altar is only mentioned in 1344, and a chapel in 1399. It was located east of the entrance to the courtyard, near the later Oriel building. The only depiction is a colored drawing by court architect Julius Eugen Ruhl, showing the partially demolished interior of the chapel in 1829. Beam holes in the wall suggest the existence of a gallery. The remaining section of the ceiling contains a late Gothic ribbed vault, adorned with the coats of arms of Hanau and the Palatinate, dating from the time of Philip III (1526–1561) and his wife Helena of Palatinate-Simmern. The console stones bear the ancestral arms of Helena and Adriana of Nassau-Dillenburg, the wife of Philip the Younger (1449–1500). The visible parts of the chapel likely date from this period.

When the Reformed County of Hanau-Münzenberg was taken over by the Lutheran Count Friedrich Casimir in 1642, St. Martin's Chapel was initially the only place in the county where Lutheran services were allowed by the Reformed elite. This was stipulated in a contract, allowing Friedrich Casimir to assume power in Hanau. In 1658, the Lutheran St. John's Church was built.

=== Erkerbau ===
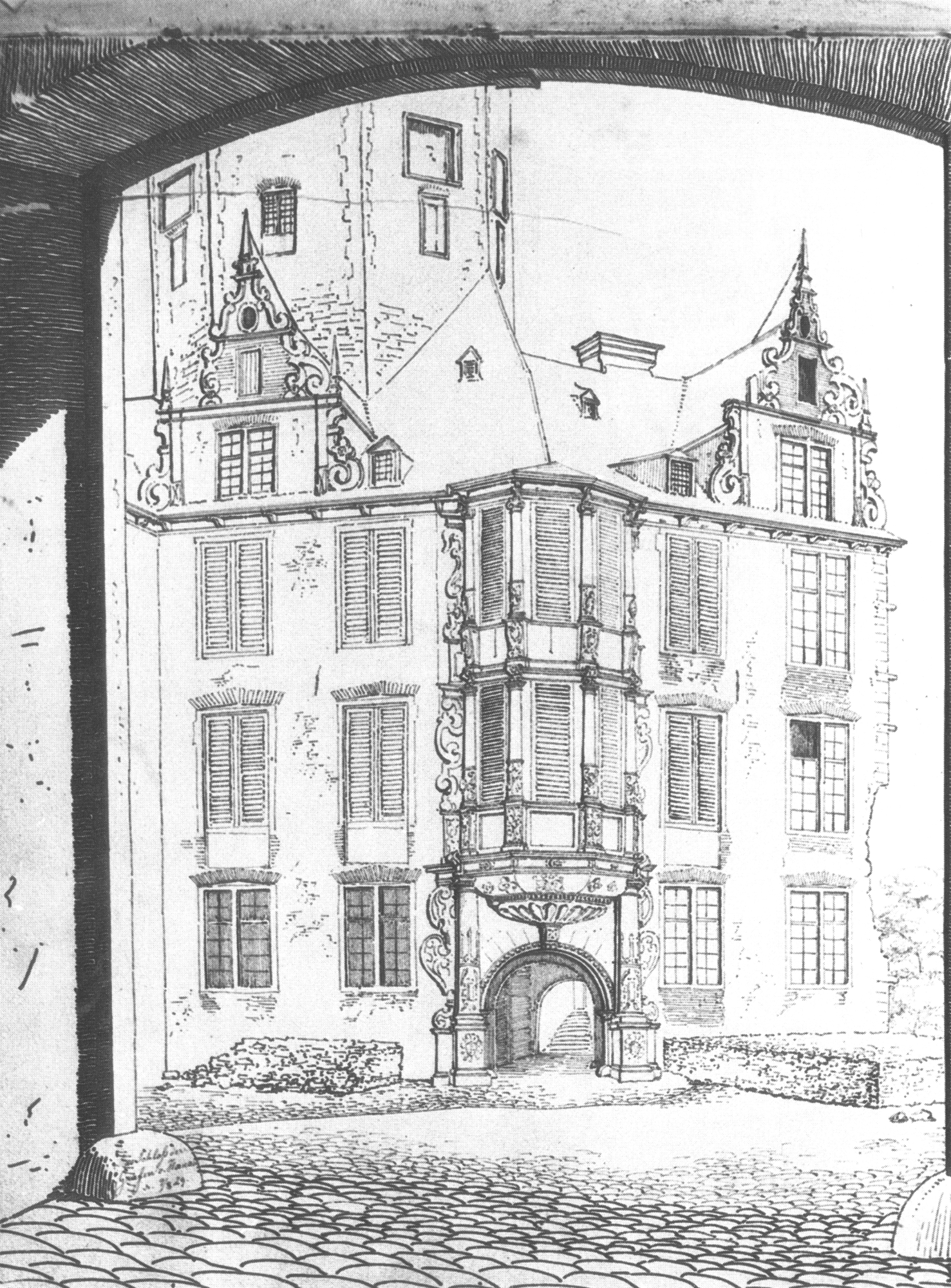
The Erkerbau

Completed in 1610 under Count Philipp Ludwig II, the so-called Ekerbau replaced the inner castle gate. The inner moat had already been leveled (likely in 1528). The Erkerbau was located on the site of the former outer courtyard and main hall. The construction plan is preserved in the Hessian State Archive in Marburg. The count desired that “in time, an oriel should be built over the gate, as wide as the gate itself.” A pen drawing by architect Johann Caspar Stawitz depicts the Oriel Building during its demolition in 1829/30, showing a two-winged, three-story building with a central entrance leading into the castle's courtyard. Above the gate is a wide, two-story oriel connecting the two wings, which meet at an obtuse angle. The roof is accentuated by dormer windows on either side of the oriel. The building featured decorative roll-work at the dormers and other transitions.

=== Residential Buildings ===
The individual residential buildings of the medieval castle are difficult to identify due to numerous renovations over time. These alterations, along with limited views of the rear (northeastern) part of the castle, show that the courtyards became increasingly cramped. The numerous renovations reflect the growing power of the Hanau counts and the expanding need for space, with the castle rarely meeting the expectations of its residents.

=== Outer Castle ===
Determining the location of the outer castle is challenging due to the many renovations. It seems that the area directly south of the main castle initially served this function. After the construction of the new city fortifications in 1528, a second outer courtyard was added to the west. This western entrance was apparently closed again in 1634, possibly as a result of Hanau's siege during the Thirty Years' War. Under Count Philipp Ludwig II, the castle expanded into the northern parts of the old town. The chronicle of Johann Adam Bernhard mentions a brewery and a bathhouse near the old chancery. The count's manor was located to the west of the outer castle, and a guardhouse stood in front of the new chancery building from 1829 to 1886, as depicted in a lithograph from around 1870.

In the High Middle Ages, the outer castle housed the residences of lower noble castle officers, whose names, such as Breidenbach, Bellersheim, and Cronberg, reflect the importance of the Hanau counts in the Wetterau region. Their associated manor estates likely occupied a significant part of the old town.

== The Buildings: the Modern-Era Palace ==
=== Fürstenbau ===
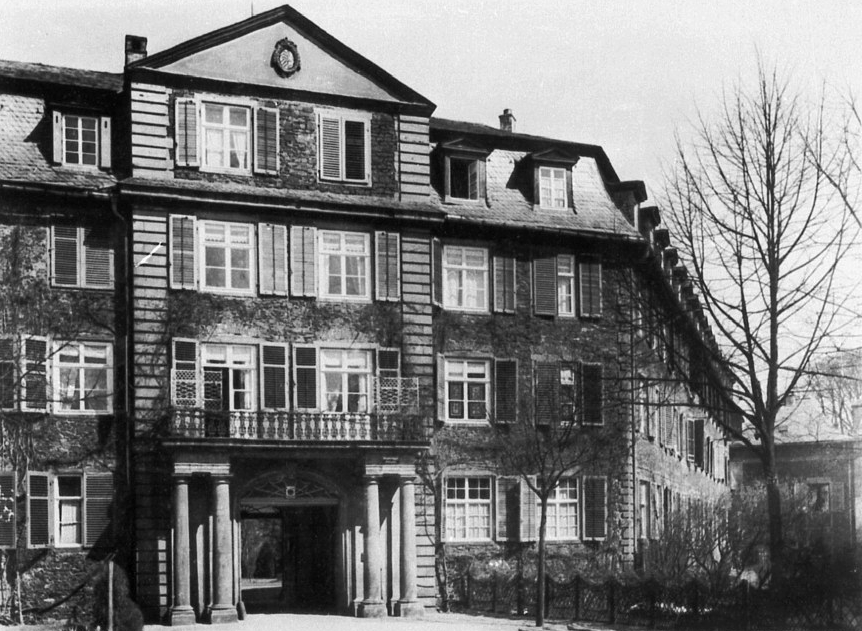
The Fürstenbau tract of the Hanau City Palace

In 1713, while the construction of the count's palace, Schloss Philippsruhe, in Kesselstadt was still underway, Count Johann Reinhard III had an elongated residential and palace building constructed in place of the old outer bailey, possibly designed by Christian Ludwig Hermann. An eastern cellar building was incorporated into the Fürstenbau and adjusted to a height of three stories. Additionally, a small risalit (projecting section) was added to the western part of the complex, as a transverse building from the old outer bailey was integrated there. The three-story building connected to the old cellar structure at an obtuse angle, with the central entrance gate serving as a passageway to the older parts of the palace until 1830. Decorative pilasters made of rusticated stone highlighted the small central risalits. On the park side, two columns flanked the portal, while four columns adorned the city-facing side, topped by a balcony.

After the medieval palace buildings were demolished, the Fürstenbau marked the boundary between the Schlossplatz and the palace park. Due to this significance, efforts were made to preserve at least this building after its destruction in 1945. However, the city demolished the ruins in 1956.

=== Friedrichsbau ===
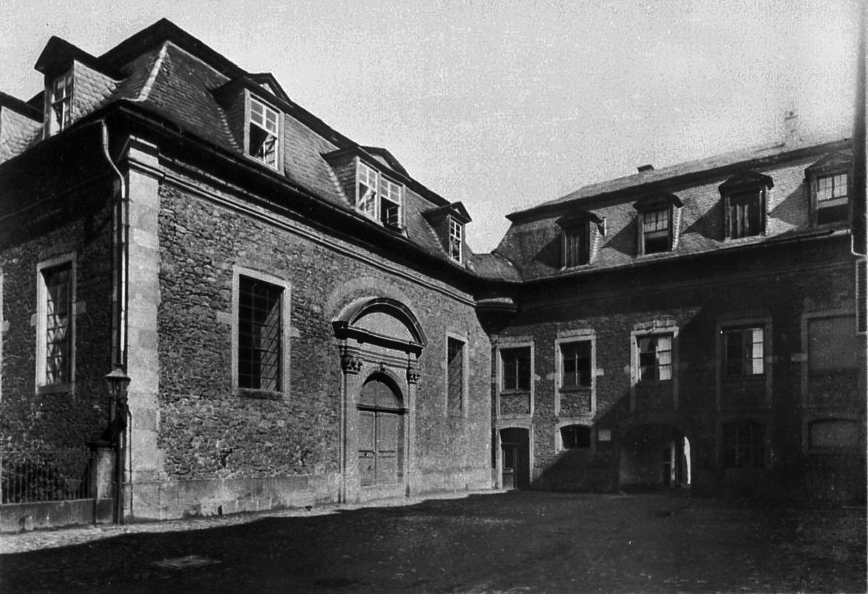
The Stables

The Friedrichsbau, completed in 1763 under the regency of Landgravine Maria, was located to the east of the stables (Marstall) and formed a U-shaped extension of the Fürstenbau toward the south. Previously, a coach house had stood in its place. Both buildings had a similar layout, and it is likely that the coach house was incorporated during the renovation, as it had stables and rooms for staff. Even after the renovation, the Friedrichsbau remained only two stories high, but it was given a tall mansard roof. Photos show rubble masonry made from basalt, similar to the Fürstenbau and the Kanzlei, with door and window frames made from sandstone. Overall, the buildings of the City Palace were modest in design. A significant difference from the city buildings can be seen in old photos: the City Palace was mostly roofed with slate, whereas the buildings of the old town primarily used tiles.

Like the coach house before it, the Friedrichsbau had no basement. During excavation for the new Karl-Rehbein School in June 1956, a wooden pile foundation was discovered under the Friedrichsbau. There were also water intrusions in the construction pit, suggesting that this part of the palace had been built over a filled-in old arm of the Kinzig River. The wood had been preserved for centuries due to the moisture in the soil.

=== The Stables ===
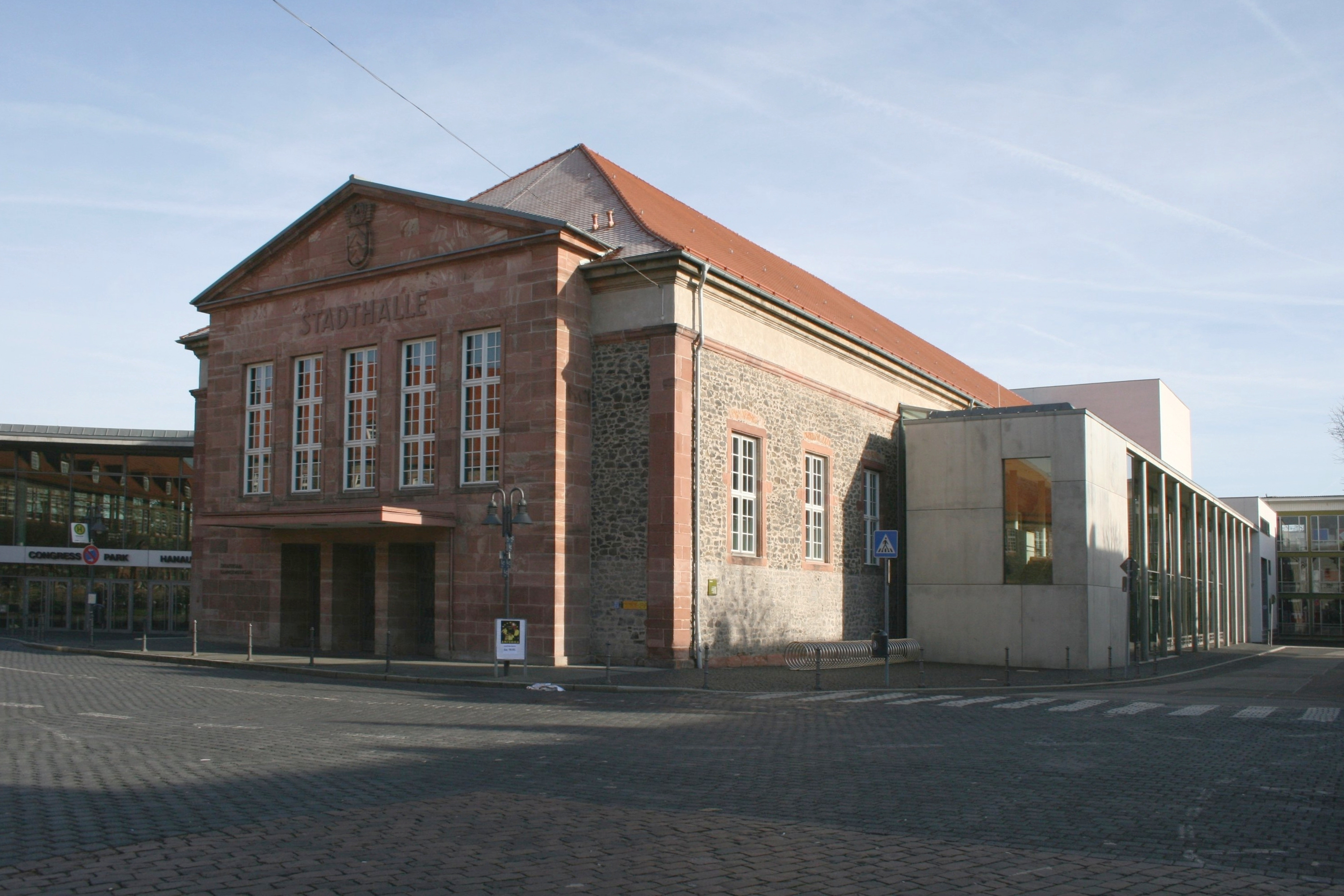
The Stables

The Marstall is a former Baroque riding hall (1711/13) designed by Julius Ludwig Rothweil. It was converted into an event hall (German: Stadthalle) in 1928. During this conversion, a new sandstone portal was added to the façade facing the Schlossplatz, featuring the Hanau coat of arms in the style of the time. After the demolition of the war-damaged Fürstenbau, a functional annex called the "Bürgerhaus" was added to the north. This annex was replaced in 2001 due to asbestos contamination by the new Congress Park Hanau (since 2003), which serves as a conference and event center. The Marstall was integrated into this Congress Park Hanau, undergoing another redesign and featuring a modern accompanying building. An extended stage building was added to the eastern end, meaning that today all the historical façades are covered with modern parts. The portal on the southern side of the Marstall, made of reddish sandstone and adorned with various equestrian equipment on its pilasters, is now difficult to recognize. Above the gate is the Hanau-Lichtenberg coat of arms.

=== The Chancery Building ===
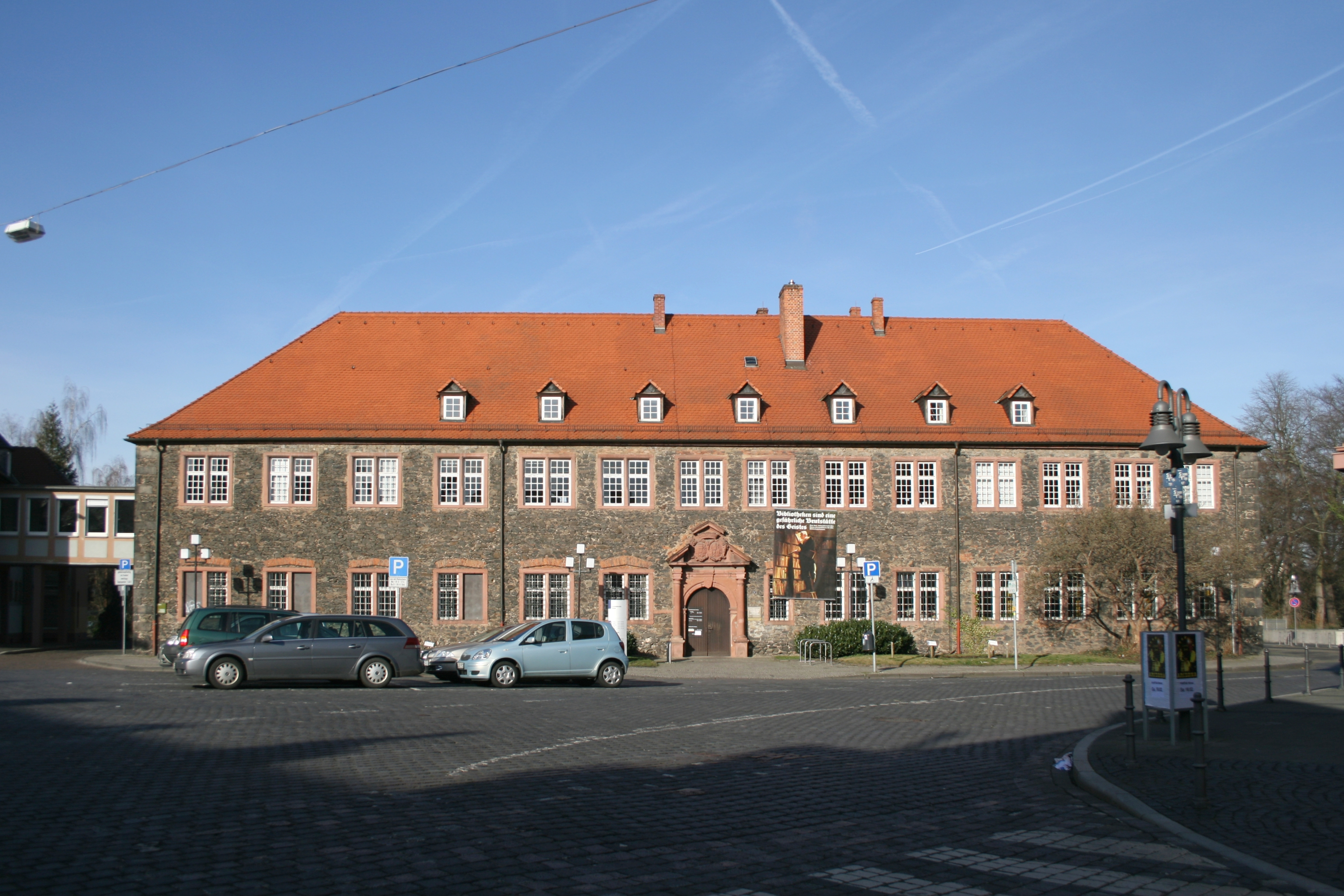
The Chancery Building

The former Chancellery Building (German: Kanzleigebäude) was constructed from 1685 to 1691, designed by architect Johann Philipp Dreyeicher. Since the 19th century, it has been used for cultural purposes. Until 2015, it housed the city library with its regional department Hanau-Hessen, the Hanau City Archive, the Wetterau Society for Natural History since 1868, and the Hanauer Geschichtsverein. These institutions are now located in the Forum Hanau. The building is made of dark basalt rubble stones, with window and door frames crafted from red sandstone from the Main River. However, it appears that the building was plastered in earlier times, as indicated by old views. Initially, the Kanzleibau featured a simple gable roof, which was later replaced with a mansard roof during the construction of the Marstall. Today, it once again has a gable roof. Above the entrance is the double coat of arms of Count Philipp Reinhard and his wife, Countess Palatine Magdalena Claudia of Zweibrücken-Birkenfeld-Bischweiler (1668–1704), with the year 1691 (the year of the building's completion) above it. The portal was created by the stonemason Andreas Neubau from Ortenberg.

=== Water Tower ===
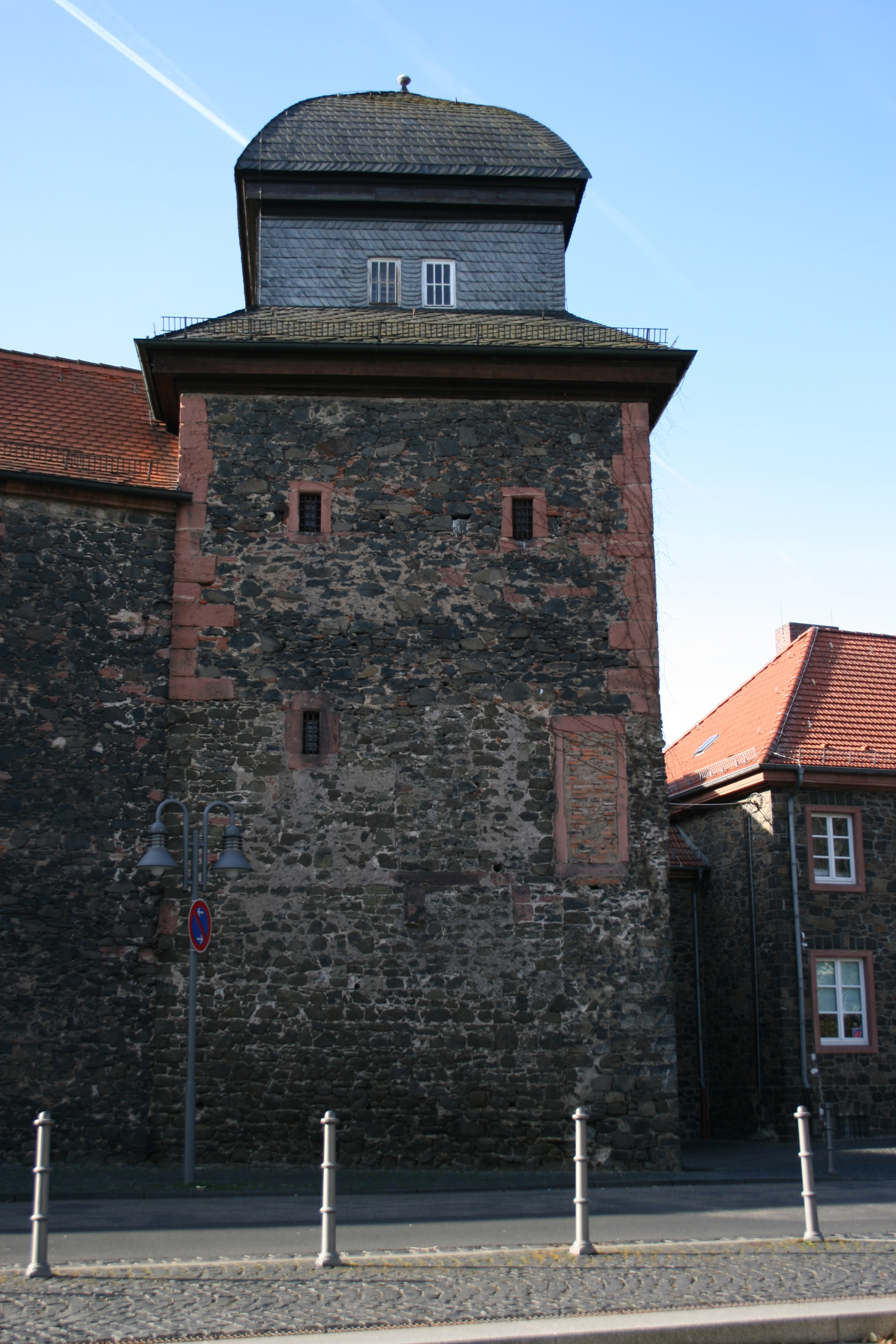
The Water Tower

The Water Tower is the last remaining fortification tower of the Hanau castle and city walls. It served as a connection between the castle, the outer bailey, and the city fortifications, receiving its name due to its location in the water of the castle and city moat. The Water Tower was likely built in the 14th century, around the time of the city fortifications first mentioned in 1338. From 1543 until 1829, it partially functioned as a military prison, and since 1962, parts of the city archive have been housed within it. On its eastern side, the cross-section of the former city wall and its walkway can still be seen in the masonry. The current roof probably dates back to the Baroque period. The Water Tower is the last building of the former castle that retains medieval structural elements.

=== Grain Storehouse ===
The former count's fruit store is located in the courtyard behind the chancery building (known as the Fronhof). The exact date of its construction cannot be pinpointed, but the Fronhof is first documented in 1457. The building now referred to as the "Fruchtspeicher" likely dates from the late 17th century. Since 1872, it housed the gendarmerie. During the Nazi dictatorship, it served as a police prison, a departure point for the deportation and subsequent murder of many individuals.

== Archeological Artifacts ==
Few artifacts remain due to the destruction in 1829 and 1945. The Hanau Historical Museum holds four decorated iron stove tiles and a decorative iron door from the castle. Other exhibits include artifacts from archaeological excavations in the castle moat.

== Park and Garden ==
=== 18th and 19th century ===
The palace garden was created in 1766 by Landgravine Maria of Hesse-Kassel, regent of the County of Hanau-Münzenberg from 1760 to 1764. She drew on experiences from her homeland, England, and had an English bosquet laid out around the oldest part of the Hanau City Palace, the medieval and early modern castle. The Hanau Palace Garden was thus one of the first English landscape garden gardens on the European mainland. After the death of Landgravine Maria, her son, Hereditary Prince William of Hesse-Kassel, later the first Elector of Hesse, expanded the palace garden in 1772. For this, the grounds of the palace bastions to the north and east of the palace were redesigned.

The arm of the Kinzig river that is now channeled through the palace garden is not directly connected to the former moat but likely emerged as part of a redesign of the park. Only the inflow near today’s Nordstraße can be identified on older maps, as it branches off from the river before the Herrenmühle weir. Today, the outflow runs through pipes under the Heinrich-Fischer-Bad in the northwest, where it returns to the Kinzig. At the corner of Heinrich-Bott-Straße and Eugen-Kaiser-Straße, the railing of a bridge can still be seen, where the former palace moat transitioned into the moat of the Hanau city fortifications.

Under Elector William II, the palace garden was completely redesigned starting in 1824. It was expanded, a pond was created, and—similar to Wilhelmsbad—a snail mound was constructed. The plan for this was drafted by Wilhelm Hentze, head of the Elector's court gardens. The plan was subsequently revised at the request of William II by Louis Meinicke. After the demolition of the medieval water castle in 1829, the palace garden was again redesigned according to plans by Louis Meinicke. The current appearance of the palace garden is largely due to these two landscape architects.

=== 20th century ===
After World War II, the bomb-damaged city palace was demolished, and the area was incorporated into the park. On the other hand, parts of the park were developed: in the 1950s with the construction of the Karl-Rehbein School, in the 1960s with the Hanau Community Center, and from 2001 to 2003 with the construction of a congress center.

The park was a key component of the Hessian State Garden Show in 2002.

Today, the park houses the relocated monument of Johann Winter von Güldenborn. In 2014, the bronze sculpture The Six Swans and Their Sister by Albrecht Glenz was installed near the central pond.

=== The plants in the garden ===
The park features a rich stock of old trees, including several natural monuments, such as a pyramidal oak, ash tree, bald cypress, dawn redwood, and Austrian black pine.

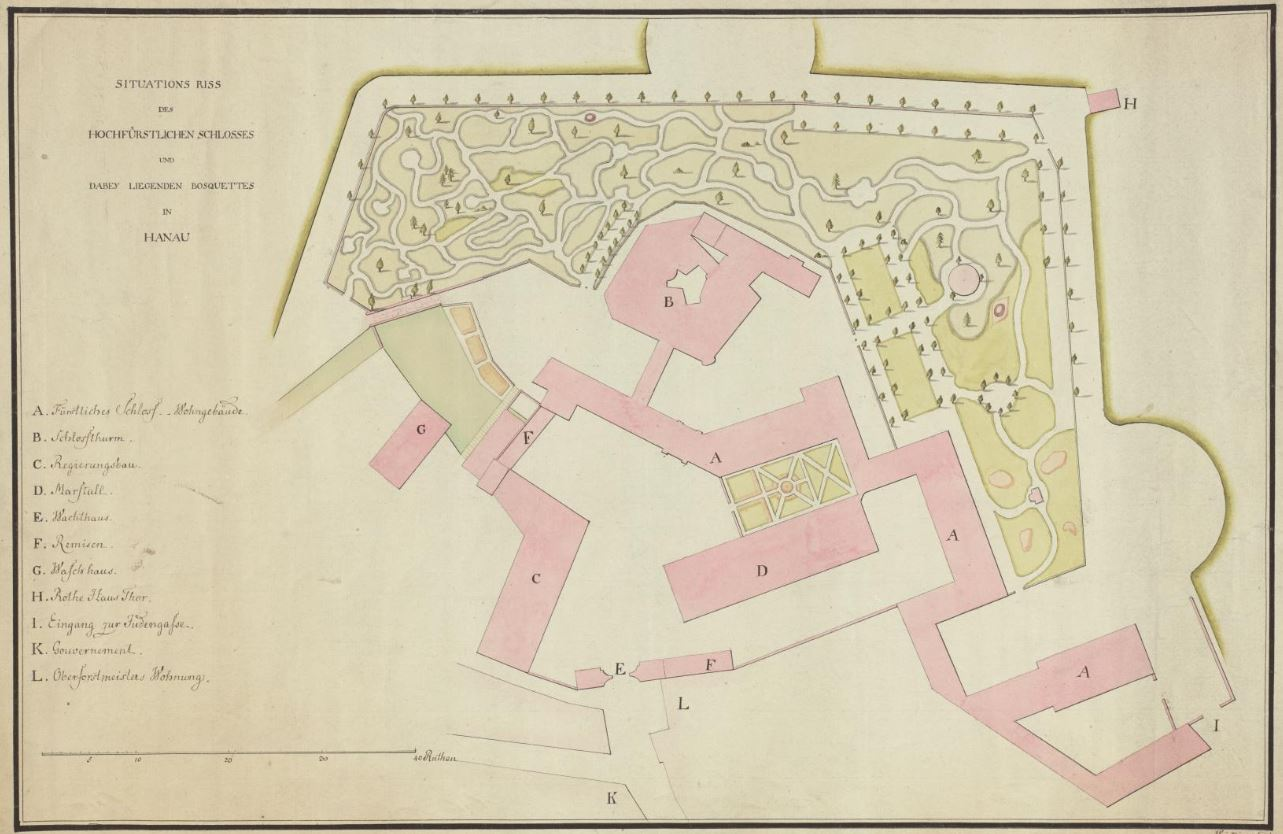
Plan of the gardens around 1794-1806

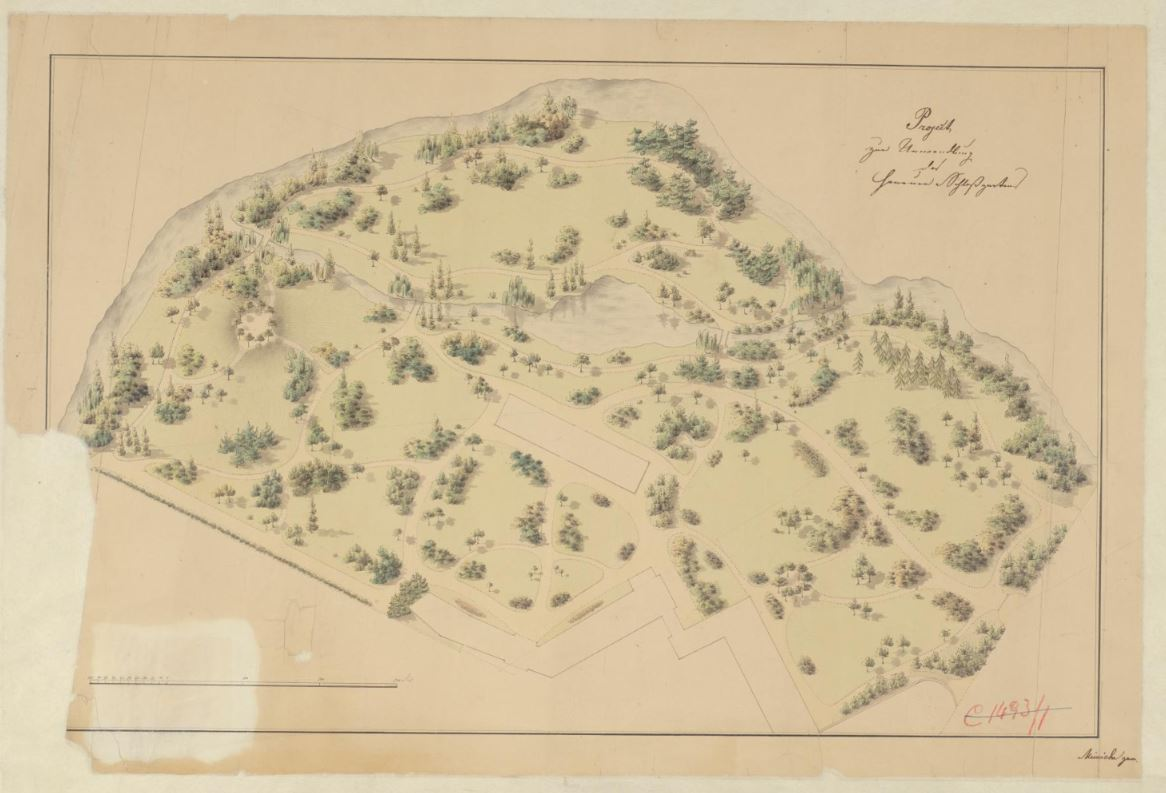
1830s Plan to redesign the park and gardens

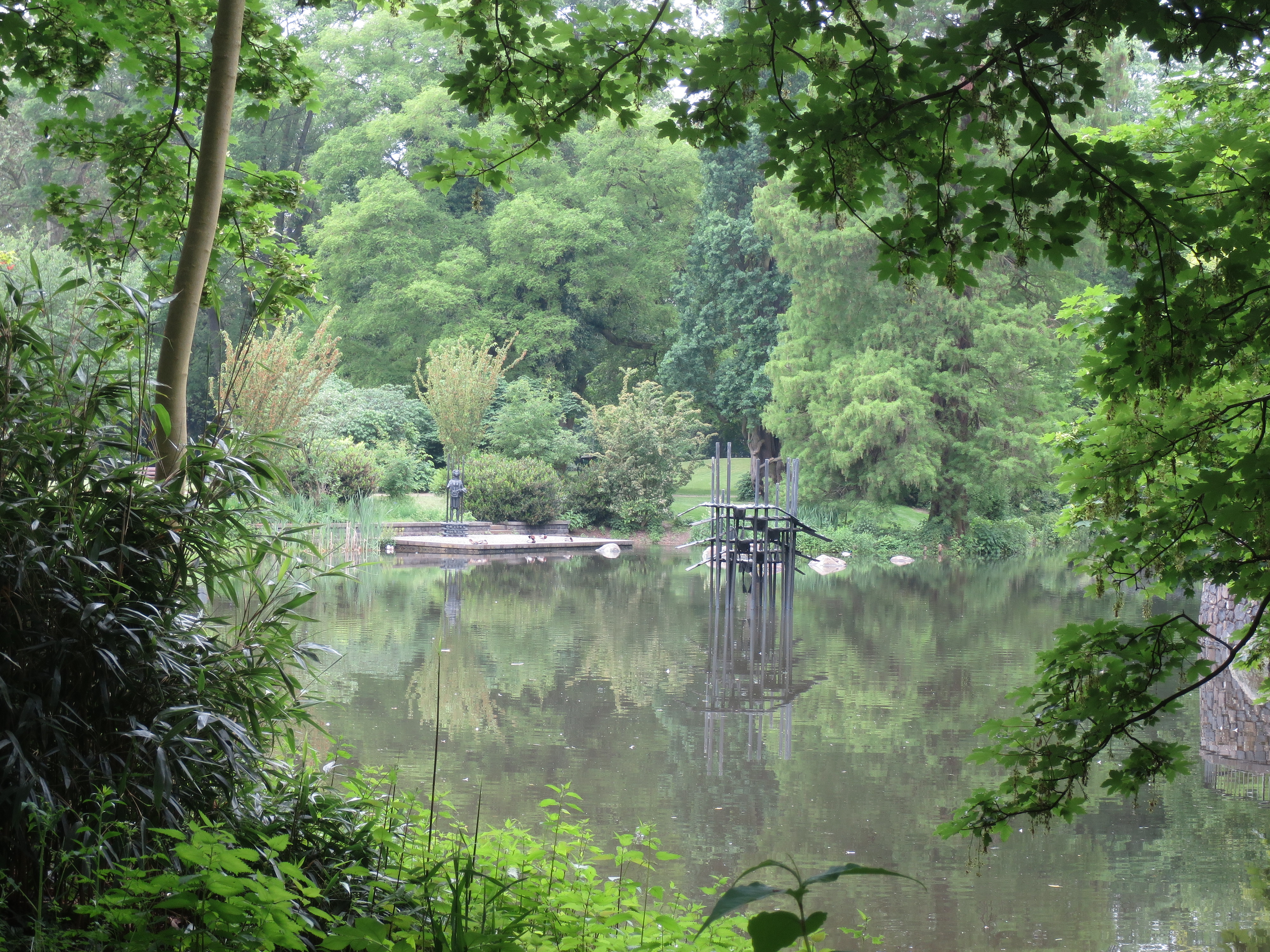
The bronze sculpture The Six Swans and Their Sister by Albrecht Glenz

== Literature ==
- 675 Jahre Altstadt Hanau. Festschrift zum Stadtjubiläum und Katalog zur Ausstellung im Historischen Museum der Stadt Hanau am Main, hrsg. vom Hanauer Geschichtsverein e. V., Hanau 1978, ISBN 3-87627-242-4.
- Heinrich Bott: Der Abbruch des alten Schlosses in Hanau und anderes über das Hanauer Stadtschloss. In: Neues Magazin für Hanauische Geschichte 3, Hanau 1955–1959, S. 59–65.
- Heinrich Bott: Die Altstadt Hanau. Baugeschichte-Häuserverzeichnis-Bilder. Ein Gedenkbuch zur 650-Jahrfeier der Altstadt Hanau. Hanau 1953.
- Heinrich Bott: Beiträge zur Baugeschichte des Schlosses in Hanau. In: Hanauer Geschichtsblätter 17. Hanau 1960, S. 49–72.
- Heinrich Bott: Stadt und Festung Hanau. In: Hanauer Geschichtsblätter 20. Hanau 1965, S. 61–125.
- Rudolf Knappe: Mittelalterliche Burgen in Hessen. 800 Burgen, Burgruinen und Burgstätten. 3. Auflage. Wartberg-Verlag. Gudensberg-Gleichen 2000, ISBN 3-86134-228-6, S. 391f.
- Karl Ludwig Krauskopf: 150 Jahre Hanauer Geschichtsverein. Festschrift zum 150-jährigen Bestehen des Vereins (Hanau 1994).
- Carolin Krumm: Kulturdenkmäler in Hessen – Stadt Hanau. Hrsg.: Landesamt für Denkmalpflege Hessen. Wiesbaden 2006, ISBN 3-8062-2054-9.
- Frank Lorscheider: Zwischenbericht über die Ausgrabungen im Bereich des Hanauer Stadtschlosses. In: Neues Magazin für Hanauische Geschichte 2002/I, S. 3–20.
- Fried Lübbecke: Hanau. Stadt und Grafschaft. Köln 1951, S. 269 ff.
- Christian Ottersbach: Die Burgen der Herren und Grafen von Hanau (1166–1642). Studien zur Burgenpolitik und Burgenarchitektur eines Adelshauses (= Hanauer Geschichtsblätter Bd. 51) Hrsg.: Magistrat der Brüder-Grimm-Stadt Hanau und Hanauer Geschichtsverein|Hanauer Geschichtsverein 1844 e. V. Hanau 2018, ISBN 978-3-935395-29-8, S. 421–483.
- Vom Residenzschloss zum Congress Park. Die (Ver)Wandlungen des Hanauer Schlossplatzes. Hrsg.: Hanauer Baugesellschaft GmbH. Hanau 2003.
- August Winkler und Jakob Mittelsdorf: Die Bau- und Kunstdenkmäler der Stadt Hanau. Festschrift zum 300jährigen Jubiläum der Gründung der Neustadt Hanau. Hanau 1897.
- Ernst Julius Zimmermann: Hanau Stadt und Land. 3. Auflage, Hanau 1919, ND 1978, ISBN 3-87627-243-2.

== See also: Other palaces owned by the counts of Hanau ==
- Hanauer Hof - City palace in Strasbourg
- Château de Bouxwiller - The residence in the capital of Hanau-Lichtenberg
- Schloss Philippsruhe - The baroque summer palace in Hanau
- Chateau de Brumath - Summer palace constructed for the daughther of Johann Reinhard III of Hanau-Lichtenberg, the mother of Louis IX of Hesse-Darmstadt
- Schloss Pirmasens - Hunting lodge of Johann Reinhard III of Hanau-Lichtenberg
