= Hôtel de Hanau =

- Hanauer Hof
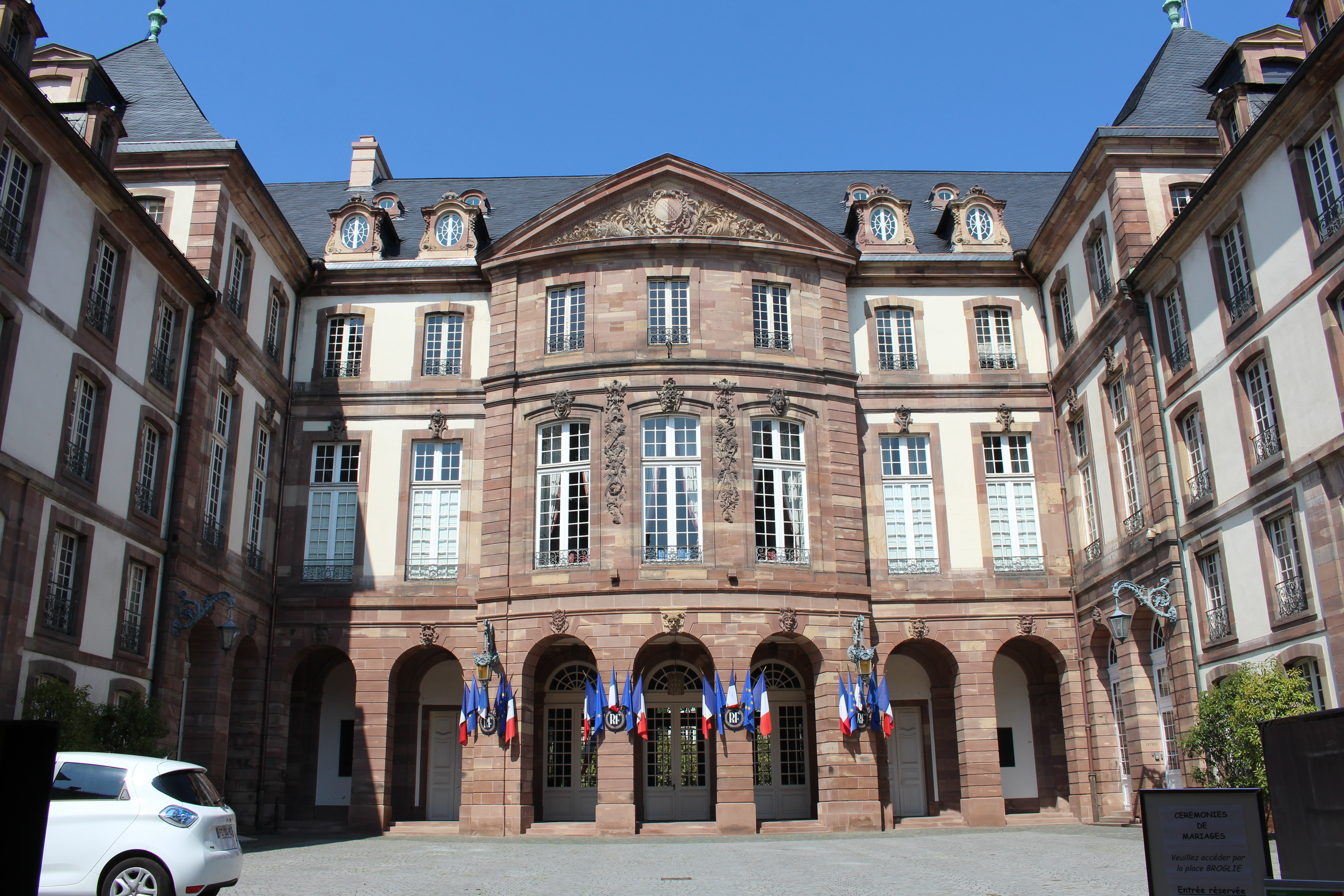
- Main entrance in the courtyard

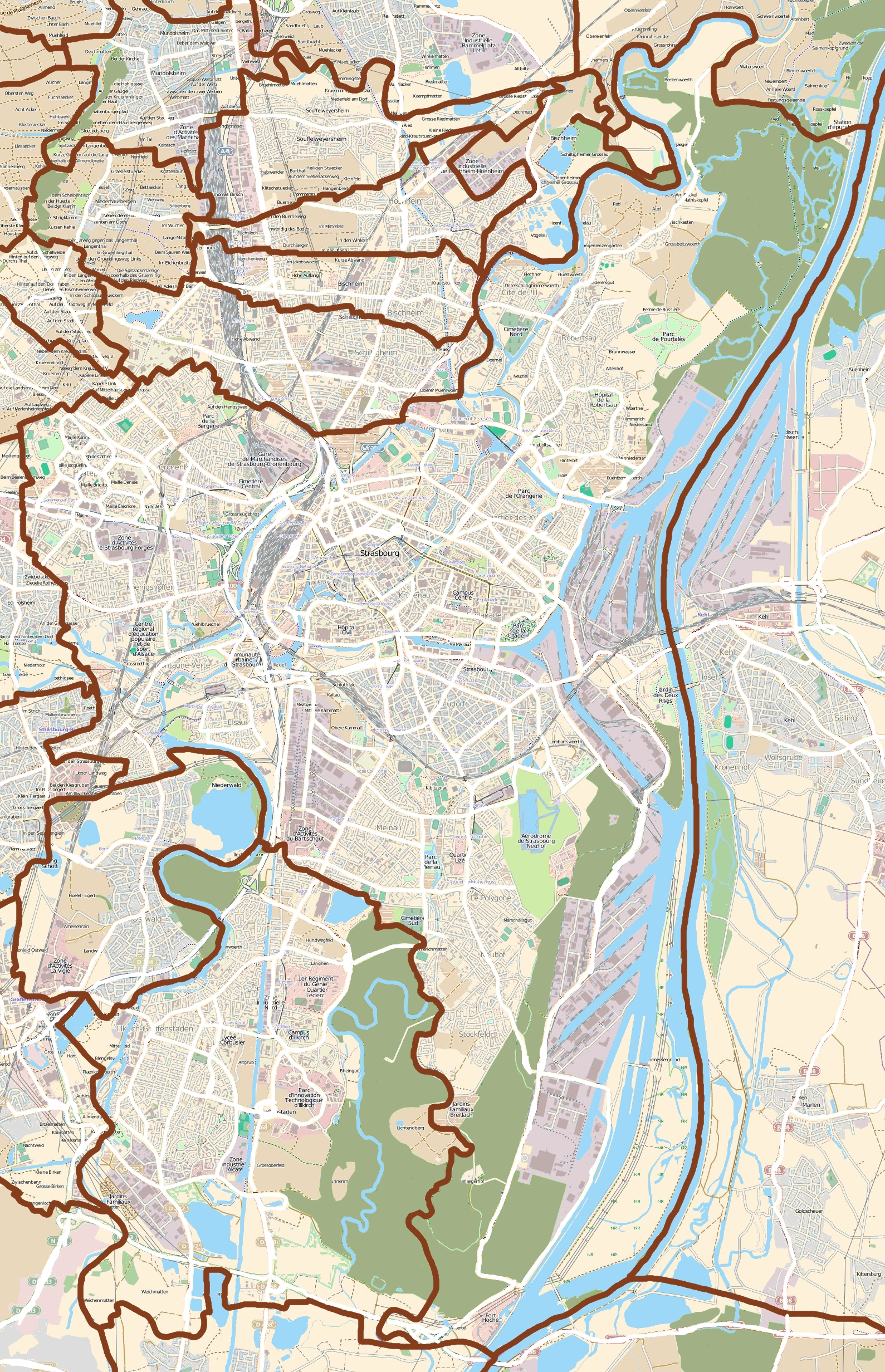
- Location within Strasbourg
- Alternative names: Hôtel de ville de Strasbourg

General information
- Type: Civic
- Architectural style: Baroque
- Location: Strasbourg, France
- Coordinates: 48°35′05″N 7°45′02″E
- Construction started: 1731
- Completed: 1736

Design and construction
- Architect: Joseph Massol

Monument historique
- Official name: Hôtel de ville, ancien Hôtel de Hanau
- Type: Inscrit
- Designated: 1921
- Reference no.: PA00085061

The Hôtel de Hanau, also known as the Hôtel de ville and (in German) as the Hanauer Hof, is a historic building located on the Place Broglie on the Grande Île in the city center of Strasbourg, in the French department of the Bas-Rhin. It was designated a monument historique by the French government in 1921.

== History ==
The barons of Ochsenstein had owned property on the Place Broglie since the 13th century. The property descended to the rulers of Hanau-Lichtenberg, a county of the Holy Roman Empire, through marriage, in the 16th century. In 1728, the last Count of Hanau-Lichtenberg, Johann Reinhard III, decided to demolish the existing building and erect a new structure. The new building would be a typical hôtel particulier with a grand portal, a grand courtyard and two ornate façades. Construction of the new building commenced in 1731. It was designed by Joseph Massol, who was also the architect of the Palais Rohan, in the Baroque style, built in ashlar stone with a cement render, and was completed in 1736.

The layout involved a three-storey main building at the back of a courtyard, with three-storey wings on either side and a high wall at the front. The main building had seven bays. The central section of three bays, which was slightly projected forward, was arcaded on the ground floor, and fenestrated with three tall square headed windows with architraves on the first floor, and three smaller square headed windows with architraves on the second floor, all surmounted by a pediment with fine carvings in the tympanum. The other bays were fenestrated in a similar style, but were cement rendered. Internally, the principal rooms included the Grand Salon, which featured a fine Gobelins tapestry depicting The Parnassus by Raphael.

In common with other foreign-owned properties, it became state-owned (bien public) in the wake of the French Revolution in 1790. In 1805, the city council presented the impressive Palais Rohan to the Emperor Napoleon, who in return gave the Hôtel de Hanau, which was much less costly to operate, to the city of Strasbourg for use as its Hôtel de ville or city hall.

An extensive programme of refurbishment works, including improvements to the roof and the replacement of internal fittings, was completed at a cost of €3.8 million in 2016. This enabled the building to continue to be used for weddings, official receptions and banquets, whilst the administration of the city and the Eurométropole de Strasbourg remained at the centre administratif (also known as mairie) near the Parc de l'Étoile (built between 1973 and 1976).

== Gallery ==
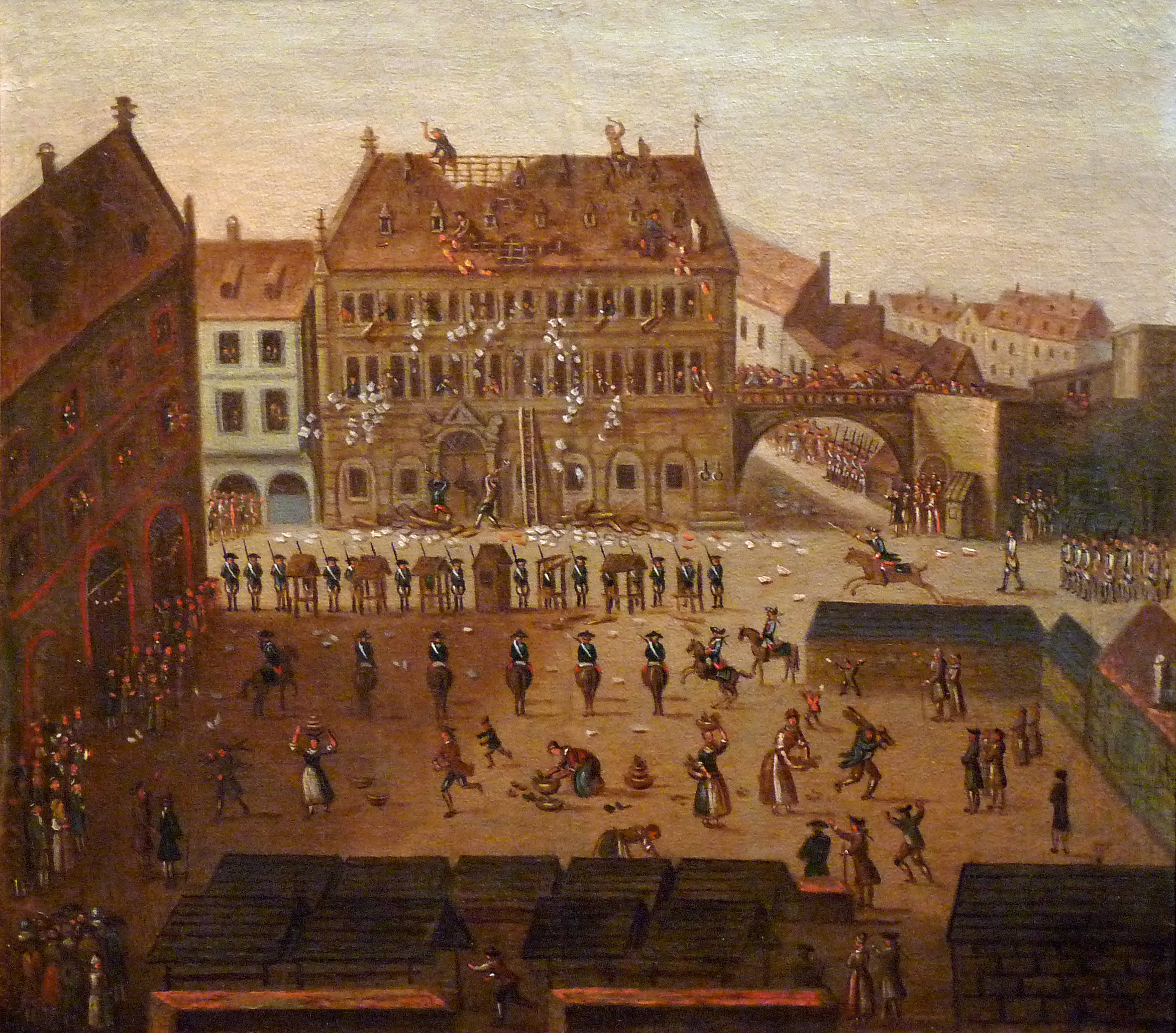
Ransacking of the former hôtel de ville by French Revolutionaries on 21 July 1789 (painting in the Musée historique de Strasbourg)

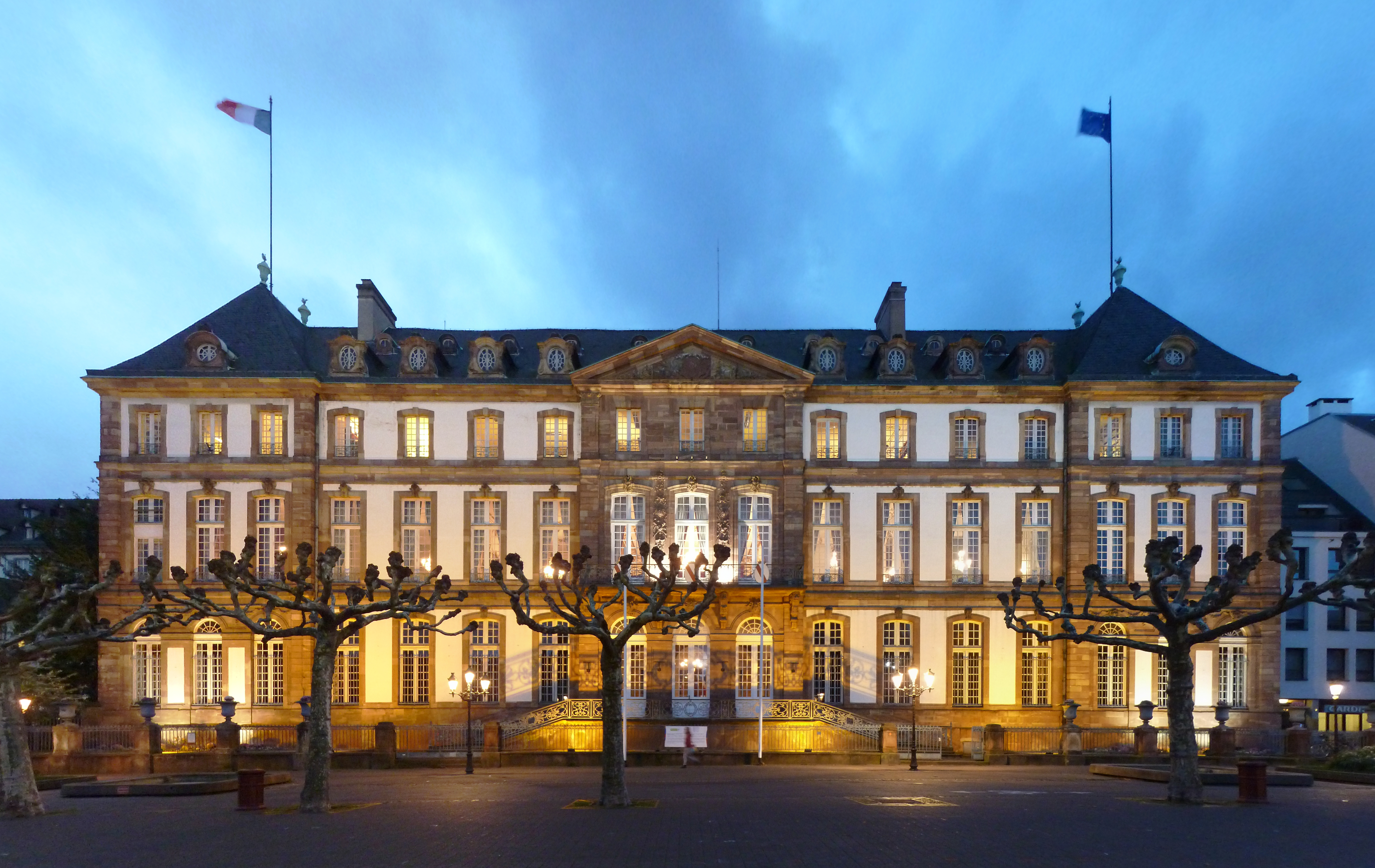
Place Broglie facade of the Hôtel de Hanau at dusk

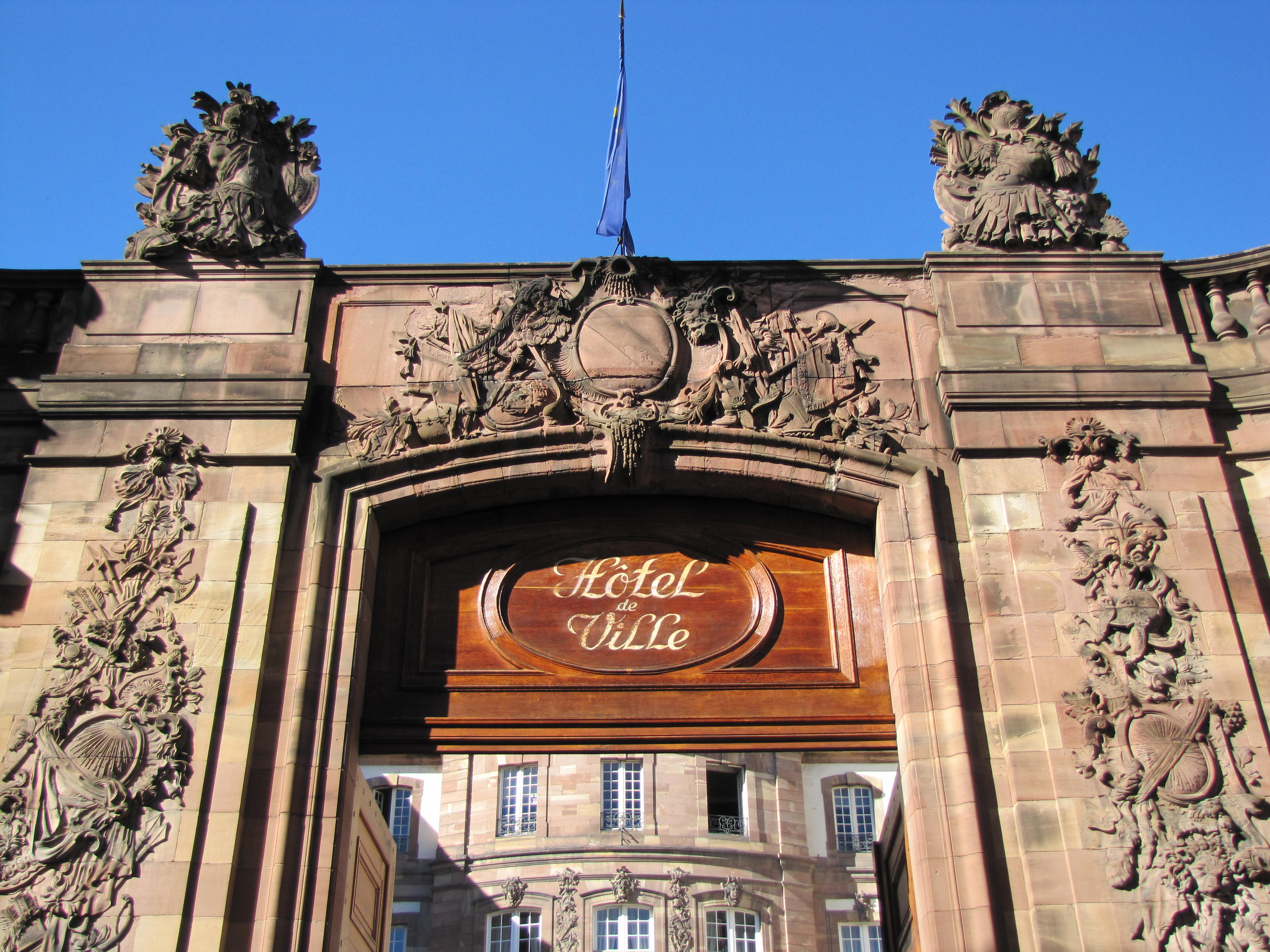
Grand portal to the courtyard on the Rue brûlée (detail)

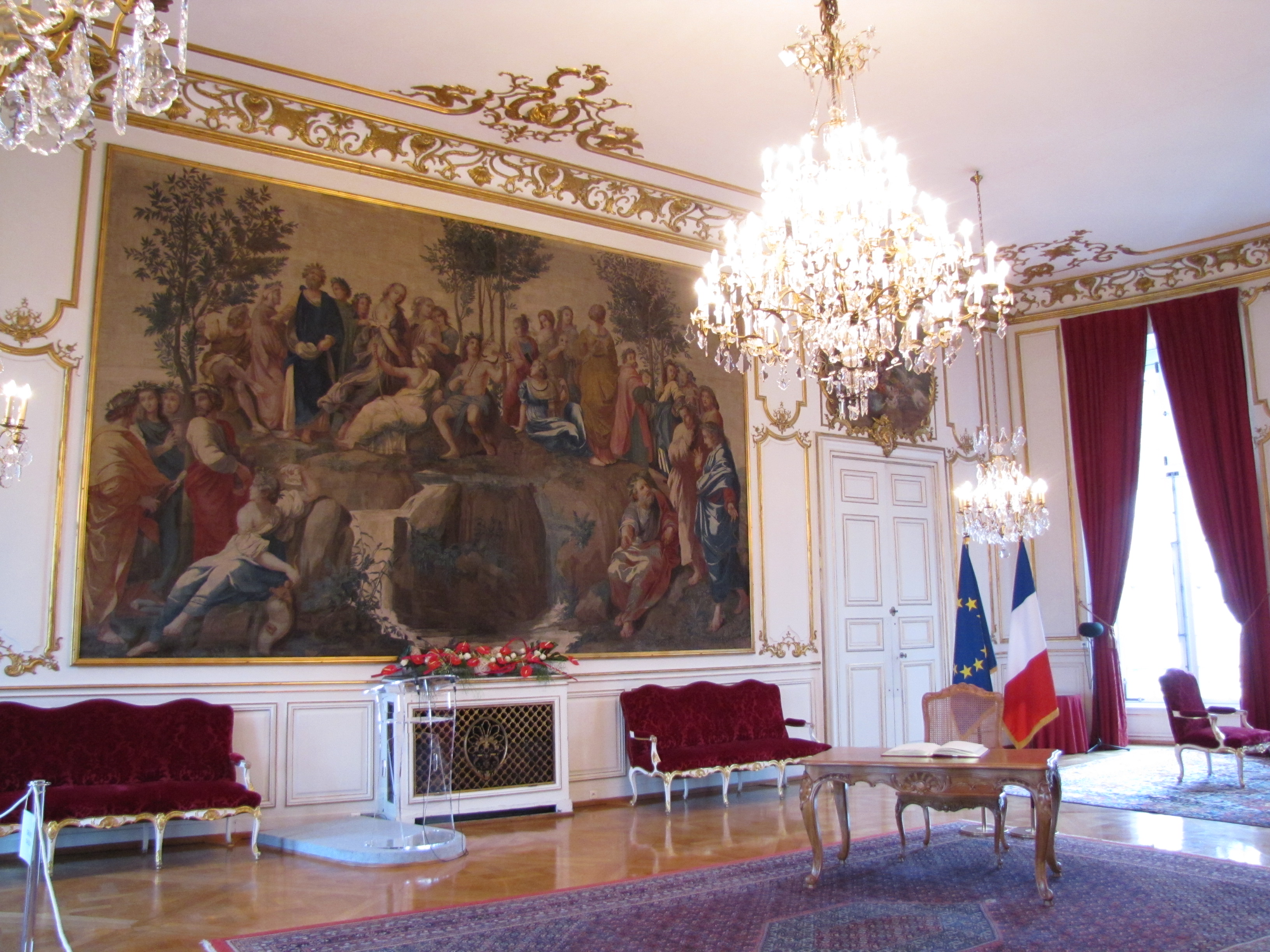
Main reception room (current state). On the wall: 1790s Gobelins tapestry, copy after The Parnassus by Raphael

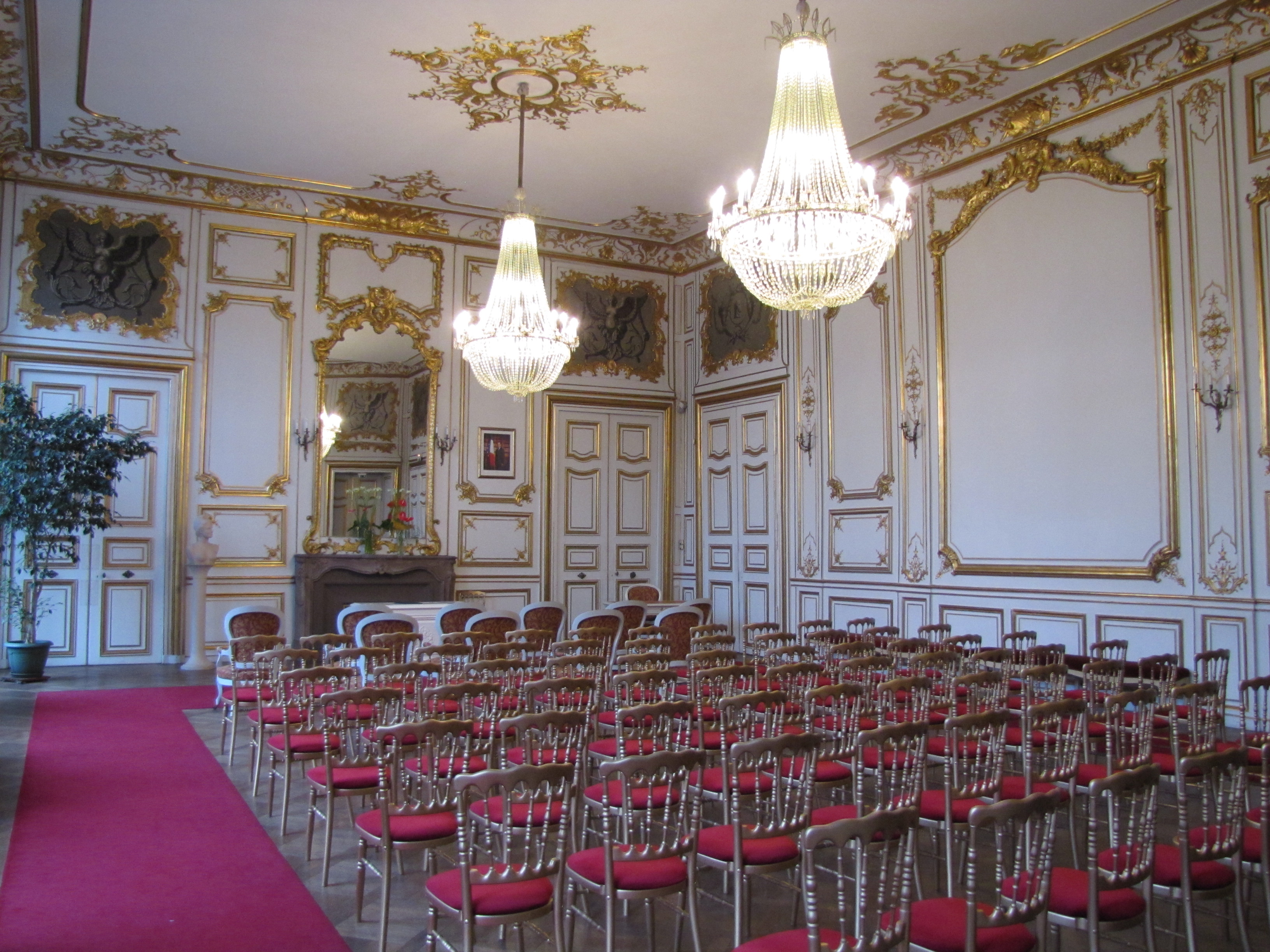
Wedding hall (current state)

== See also ==
Other palaces owned by the counts of Hanau:

- Château de Bouxwiller – The château in Bouxwiller, residence of Hanau-Lichtenberg
- Stadtschloss Hanau – The city palace of Hanau
- Schloss Philippsruhe – The baroque summer palace in Hanau
- Schloss Pirmasens – The hunting lodge in Pirmasens
- Chateau de Brumath – Summer palace constructed for his daughter, the mother of Louis IX of Hesse-Darmstadt
