= Château de Bouxwiller =

Castle in Bas-Rhin, Alsace, France

Coordinates: 48°49′34″N 7°29′01″E

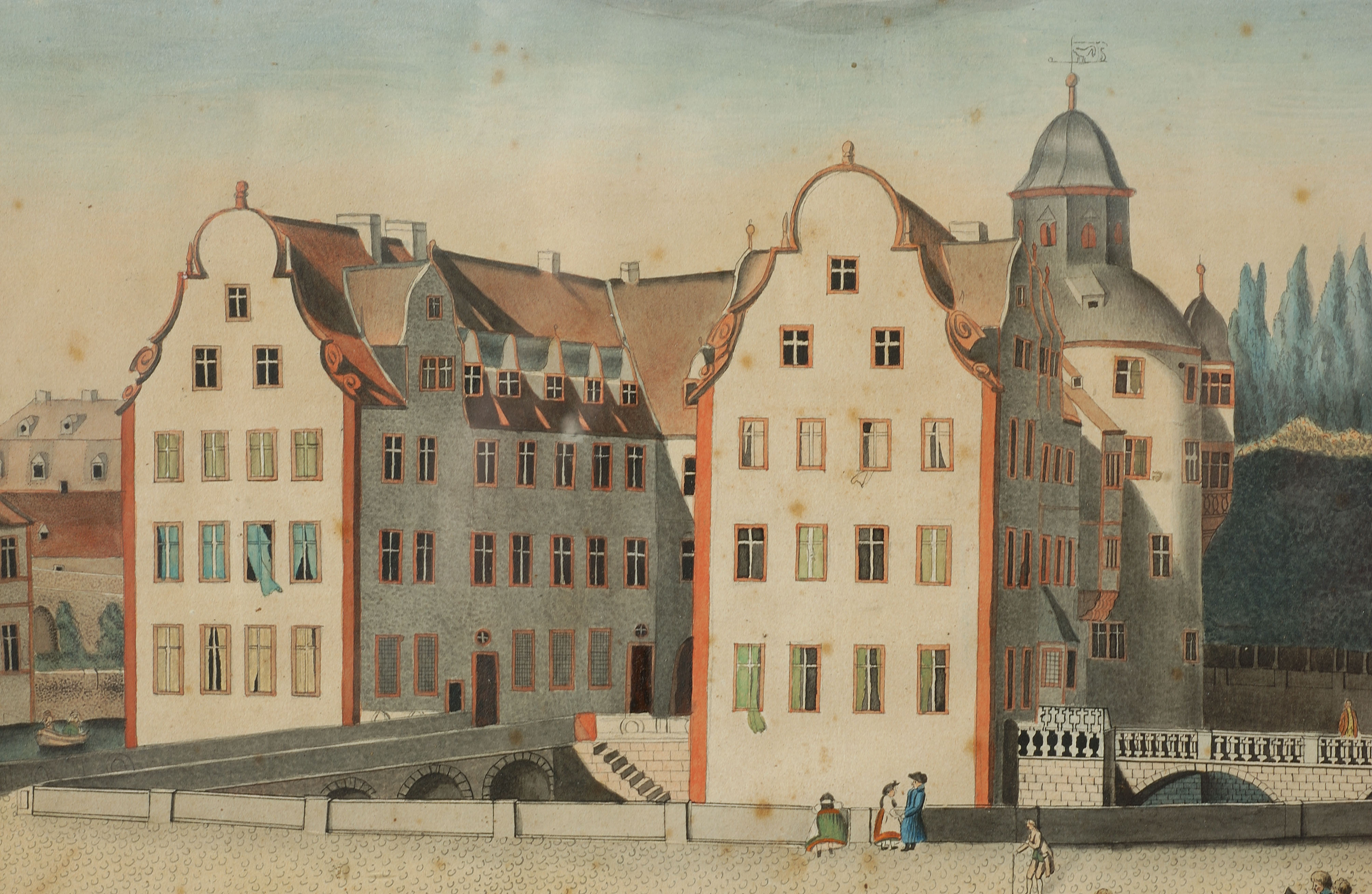
The pre-Revolutionary château: watercolour by Lutz, late 18th century (Musée de Bouxwiller)

The Château de Bouxwiller was a moated castle situated in the département of Bas-Rhin, Alsace, France, constructed in the 15th century under its lords, the von Lichtenberg family. Remodeled many times, the château served more as a residence than a military post. In the 18th century, its attractive and terraced French-styled gardens were very well known.

However, the original building did not survive the destruction of the French Revolution. Its replacement of the same name is located in the Place du château in the town of Bouxwiller.

== History ==
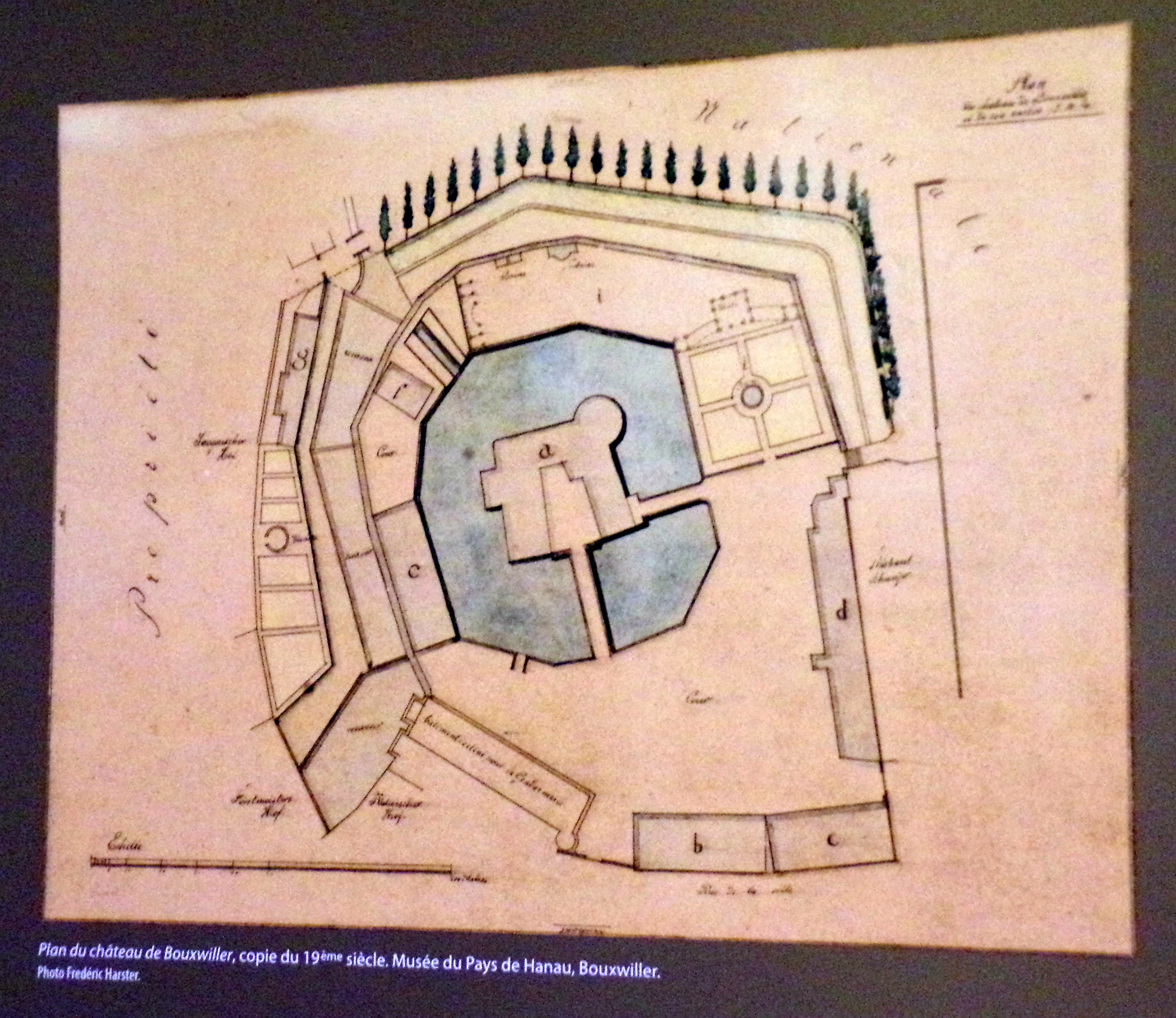
Plan of the Château and its direct environments

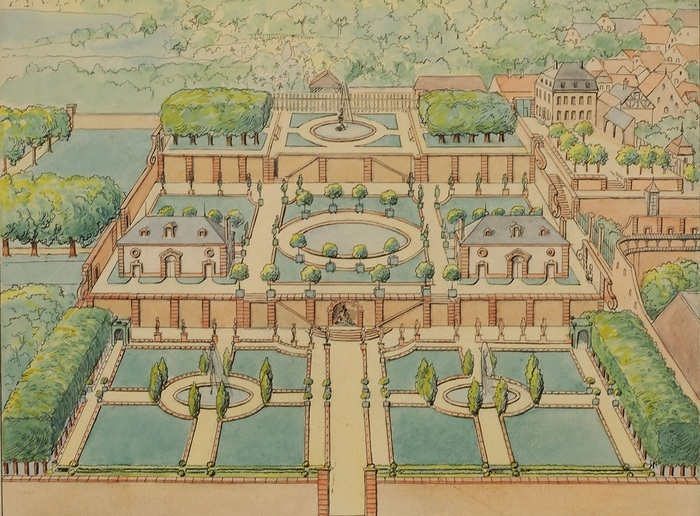
The 18th century gardens

The Château de Bouxwiller was the central point of the Lordship of Lichtenberg until the revolutionary times, first under the Lichtenbergs, and later under the counts of Hanau-Lichtenberg. In the 18th century, it was the residence of Landgravine Caroline of Hessen-Darmstadt, who was passionate about art and music and transformed Bouxwiller into a "small Versailles" in Alsace, complete with beautiful gardens. While at the same time her husband, Louis IX, Landgrave of Hesse-Darmstadt, lived separately from her at Schloss Pirmasens.

The medieval fortress of the Lichtenberg family was replaced in the 14th century by another construction of the Wasserburg type, located in a basin to the northeast of the city's ramparts, on what is now the Place du Château. This second château no longer exists. Between 1793 and 1808, this construction went from being looted to falling into disrepair, ultimately becoming a stone quarry.

== Architecture ==
To ensure its defense, this U-shaped building, located on flat terrain, was entirely surrounded by a moat filled with water from the nearby Fischpfuhl spring. Two stone bridges were built to access it: one with five arches leading to the courtyard of honor, and the other with two arches leading to a formal garden.

The two northern and southern wings, in Renaissance style, surrounded the courtyard of honor. To the southeast, a circular medieval tower formed the heart of this three-story building (not counting the two-level attic).

A plan dated 1779 shows the château surrounded by a defensive wall, which has since disappeared. Only a section of this wall remains in the 21st century, forming the wide rear wall of the current Halle aux Blés (grain hall), located to the south of the château.

Between the seigneurial residence and the town of Bouxwiller, administrative buildings were constructed. These buildings, unlike the château and its moats, still exist. The 16th-century Halle aux Blés, extended by the Saint-Georges castle chapel dating from the 14th century, the carriage house with the Court of Accounts on the upper floor (1702), the chancery (now the town hall) built between 1658 and 1663, the stables (1688), of which only part has been preserved to house the post office, and finally the seigneurial office from 1704, modified in 1956."

== Bibliography ==
- Collectif, Pays d'Alsace, Bouxwiller, tome un, cahier 131 bis. Imprimerie Veit, Société d'Histoire et d'Archéologie de Saverne et Environs, 1985 (143 pp.) ISSN 0245-8411
- Collectif, Pays d'Alsace, Bouxwiller, tome deux, cahier 149 bis. Imprimerie Veit, Société d'Histoire et d'Archéologie de Saverne et Environs, 1989 (143 pp.) ISSN 0245-8411

== See also: Other palaces owned by the counts of Hanau ==
- Hanauer Hof - City palace in Strassbourg
- Stadtschloss Hanau - The city palace of Hanau
- Schloss Philippsruhe - The baroque summer palace in Hanau
- Schloss Pirmasens - The hunting lodge in Pirmasens
- Chateau de Brumath - Summer palace constructed for his daughther, the mother of Louis IX of Hesse-Darmstadt
